= Yousaf Saleem Chishti =

Pakistani scholar (1895–1984)

Professor Yousaf Saleem Chishti

Personal life
- Born: 1895 Bareilly, British India
- Died: 1984 (aged 88–89) Karachi, Pakistan
- Main interest: Iqbaliat

Religious life
- Religion: Islam

Yousaf Saleem Chishti (Urdu: پروفیسر یوسف سلیّم چشتی 1895 – 1984), popularly known as Yusuf Salim Chishti, was a Pakistani scholar and writer. He was the interpreter and commentator of Muhammad Iqbal's work and worked with him from 1925 to 1938 predominantly.

== Early life and education ==
Yousaf Saleem Chishti was born in Bareilly, British India in 1895 as Muhammad Yousaf Khan.

He received his early education in Allahabad. He obtained BA Honors in Philosophy from Aligarh Muslim University (1918) and in 1924 he did his MA Philosophy from Ahmedabad University.

== Career ==
He taught at Forman Christian College Lahore and from 1929 to 1943, he served as Principal, Ashaat e Islam College Lahore. In 1948, he shifted to Karachi and started his literary career. He had close relations with Quaid-e-Azam Muhammad Ali Jinnah and Allama Muhammad Iqbal, he used to attend meetings at Javid Manzil, Lahore (Allama Muhammad Iqbal's residence). He recorded conversations in his diaries but in 1955 most of them were destroyed by a flood of the Ravi River in Lahore. He is famous for his commentaries on Allama Muhammad Iqbal's works and these commentaries are particularly known to be grounded in philosophy and comparative religion, as he was particularly knowledgeable in Hinduism, as "during his stay in Lahore, he met Lala Lajpat Roy Lahori and on his advice studied Vedas and Shastras from a Hindu pundit. Later, Swami Prakash Anand taught him Upanishads, Gita and Hindu philosophy of mysticism."

== Literary works ==
He wrote many books and his major subject was Iqbal and his poetry. His books include:

- Sharah Asrar-i-Khudi
- Sharah Rumuz-i-Bekhudi
- Sharah Payam-i-Mashriq
- Sharah Bang-i-Dara
- Sharah Zabur-i-Ajam
- Sharah Javid Nama
- Sharah Bal-i-Jibril
- Sharah Zarb-i Kalim
- Sharah Pas Cheh Bayed Kard ai Aqwam-e-Sharq
- Sharah Armughan-e-Hijaz (in Persian and Urdu)
- Commentary on Mohkamat Alam-e-Qurani
- Commentary on Diwan-e-Ghalib
- Radha Krishnan Aur Iqbal: Mumasilat-o-Mutabiqat Afkaar
- Taleemat-e-Iqbal
- Sharah Rumi-e-Asr: Iqbal Ki Nazmein
- Anwar-e-Mujaddidi
- Allama Iqbal Marhoom: Hayat, Falsafa, Paygham
- Maulana Syed Hussain Ahmad Madni Ke Baare Mai Sabiqa Gustakhana Aur Touheen Aamez Rawayye Par Aetiraf-e-Taqseer-o-Nadamat
- Allama Iqbal Marhoom Ke Ash’ar Mutaliqa Syed Hussain Ahmad Madni Ki Zaruri Wazahat
- Tareekh Tasawwuf ma Islami Tasawwuf Mai Ghayr Islami Nazriyat ki Aamezish

== See also ==
- Pakistan
- Muhammad Ali Jinnah
- Allama Muhammad Iqbal
- Iqbal Academy Pakistan
- Iqbal Cyber Library
