= Khudi =

Philosophical concept developed by Muhammad Iqbal

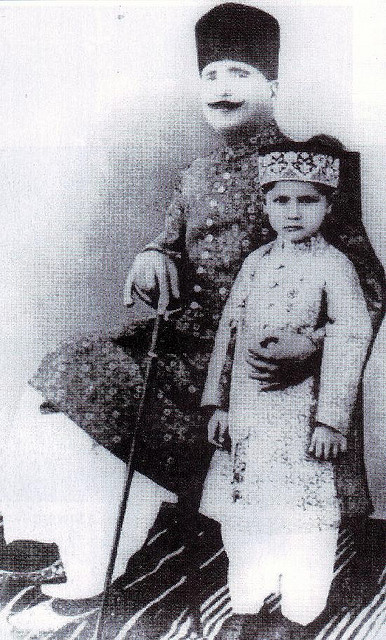
Mohammad Iqbal with his son Javid Iqbal on Eid-al Fitr in 1930

Khudi (Urdu: خودی, romanized: Khūdī, lit. 'Selfhood') is a philosophical concept developed by Muhammad Iqbal. His philosophical writings and poetical works had a notable impression on the religio-cultural and social revival of the East, particularly on the Muslims of the subcontinent. The central theme of his philosophical thought throughout his works, prose and poetry, especially in The Secrets of the Self, The Secrets of Selflessness and Message from the East is the doctrine of Khudi. As a Muslim sage he realised that the revival of man both as an individual and as a member of a social group can only come from the ultimate central principle of his being, namely, the Self or Khudi. His knowledge convinced him that the decadent condition of Muslims was due to those philosophical systems which regard the world as a mere illusion not worth striving for, and to certain classes of Sufis who regarded self-annihilation as the highest goal of human life. His use of the term Khudi is synonymous with the world of Ruh as mentioned in the Quran. To him the main purpose of the Quran is to awaken in human beings "the higher consciousness of his manifold relations with Allah and the universe". In his opinion, the undeveloped condition and the miserable plight of the Muslim nations were due to losing the true identity of Khudi and distancing themselves from the true spirit of Islam.

Iqbal's ideal for individual as well as social life is Self-affirmation not Self-negation which was the common teaching of Hindu and Sufi pantheism. Hence Iqbal tried to establish a firm theoretical foundation for his viewpoints, and to discover a proper philosophical terminology for conveying his message to all the humanity. To Iqbal Khudi is a universal and comprehensive reality with different degrees in expression, which moves perfection. Various factors and principles-which are mostly the same positive and negative religio-moral qualities can strengthen or weaken Khudi in human beings until it reaches the highest stage of perfection, that is, Vicegerency of God on earth. Iqbal, therefore, condemned the doctrine of dissolution of the human self into the featureless Absolute as an Ideal of inaction and poverty of life, and developed his own doctrine based on self-affirmation under the unique name of Khudi. According to him:

1. Khudi is a reality neither an abstract thought nor an idea that reveals itself as a unity of what we call mental states. Mental states does not exist in mutual isolation. They mean and involve one another. They exist as phases of a complex whole, called mind. To Iqbal, inner experience is the ego or Khudi at work. In deed our appreciation of the ego itself in the act of perceiving, judging and willing depends ultimately on the conviction that Khudi is real and is not merely an illusion of the mind.
2. Khudi is a universal and multi-degree reality. There is a gradually rising note of egohood in the whole universe which differs in degree among the creatures. We are conscious of this in our own self, in nature before us and in the ultimate principle, of all life, the Ultimate Ego.
3. Khudi is the gauge of the degree of reality of any living organism. In the scale of life the status of every object is fixed according to extent it develops its Khudi and gains mastery over the environment. Khudi attains highest development in man and here it becomes Personality.
4. Khudi is not an independent reality. God the Infinite Khudi, is the Source of life for the finite Khudi which can maintain its existence only as long as it is in contact with this All-embracing Divine Khudi. This Khudi, born in the heart of the Infinite Khudi developing in Him, and yet distinct from Him, unable to exist without Him, but also unable to be non-existent in His presence.
5. Khudi in human beings is individual and uniqueness. Iqbal says that our pleasures, pains, desires and experiences related to different things and persons which are exclusively ours, forming a part and parcel of our private Khudi alone. It is this unique interrelation of our mutual states that we express by the word ‘I’.
6. Khudi is not a datum; it is an achievement. Khudi has the quality of growth as well as the quality of corruption. To Iqbal if Khudi does not take the initiative, if he does not evolve the inner richness of his being, if he ceases to feel the inward push of advancing life, then the spirit within him hardens into stone and he is reduced to the level of dead matter. The greater man's distance from God, the less his individuality.
7. The highest stage of development of Khudi is not self-negation-Fana but self-affirmation-Baqa. The fully developed Khudi does not dissolve even when the Reality is seen face to face as in mystic experience. He who comes nearest to God is the completes person. Nor that he is finally absorbed in God. Fand to Iqbal is not in the meaning of annihilation of Khudi but according to the Prophetical tradition, Takhallaqu bi-Akhlaq-i-Allah, it is essentially the annihilation of human attributes and their substitution by Divine ones.Thus man becomes unique by becoming more and more like the most unique Individuality.
8. The basis of Iqbal's doctrine of khudi is a strong faith in the evolution of man. To Iqbal this evolution is to be attained by fortifying Khudi. The most important factors which strengthen Khudi are: Love, desire, Action, Faqr, Courage, Suffering, Tolerance and Forbearance. Khudi in this evolutionary process towards uniqueness has to pass through three stages; Obedience to Law, Self-Control and Divine-Vicegerency.
9. By the side of factors and rules which strengthen Khudi, the fully grown Khudi will not be attained unless it associates with other Khudis in the community to which it belongs. So the kind of society in which the greatest scope for the free development of Khudi is provided is of the great importance. According to Iqbal's philosophy of Khudi, a nation is, just as the individual, a Khudi, and has to follow the same lines of conduct as the individual does. Hence the same rules and elements required to flourish the individual Khudi are applied to the community as the national Khudi as well.

== Background ==
Iqbal was born on 9 November 1877 at Sialkot in the Punjab, and died at 21 April 1938 in Lahore. He, as is well known, came from a Kashmiri Brahmin stock. The Brahmins, as devotees to Brahma (a Hindu deity) were given to learning, knowledge and contemplation, and thus produced generations of talented persons. His ancestors around the two hundred and fifty years before Iqbal's birth had converted to Islam. As an enlightened family, they not only observed the practices of Islam but also were imbued with its spirit. Iqbal, therefore, from his very infancy was made conversant with Islam and inherited its best traditions. On the other hand, Iqbal's teachers had a vital role in the progress and maturity of his personality. Mir Hasan Shah, a Muslim savant and spiritual man, who undertook his education and training at an early age, nurtured him with the spirit of Islamic thought and literature. This tasted received an additional impetus at the hands of Thomas Walker Arnold, an orientalist. Arnold not only initiated Iqbal into modern scholarship but also created in him a devotion to scientific knowledge and western thought, in the pursuit of which Iqbal went to Europe. His visit to the west can be considered as second phase of Iqbal's life. There, contemplating on modern sciences and philosophy, he did not separate from the stream of oriental consciousness and wrote his dissertation on The Development of Metaphysics in Persia. He took advantage of his stay in Germany and England and searched thoroughly the libraries of Europe for rare manuscripts on Muslim learning and literature. At the same time, Iqbal, assimilated to the full the intellectual bias, voluntaristic tendencies, the scientific method and the dynamism of European thought. Eventually he was awarded Ph.D. in philosophy and returned to India in 1908.

On the other hand, Iqbal was fully conscious of depressing and pitiable conditions of the East towards the close of the nineteenth century. The consolidation of British role and the deliberate policy of the British to weaken the Muslim politically, economically and culturally had gradually broken the Muslim spirit. The last attempts of religious reformists and revivalists to reestablish Muslim supremacy and revival the moral and spiritual merits of the followers of Islam had failed. Iqbal was deeply pained at the sad plight of the Muslims. He was also conscious of his mission to regenerate his people from whom the foreign rulers had snatched away power and supremacy. From long before he had reflected deeply over the problems of his co-religionists. His deep and wide knowledge of sociology and the history of different cultures convinced him that the main responsibility for oriental decadence lay at the door of those philosophical systems which inculcated self-negation and self -abandonment, i.e.the Vedanta school, the doctrine of oneness or wahdat-al-wujud in Sufism and Hellenic and neo- Platonic ideas which regarded the world as a mere illusion not worth striving for. These system of thoughts encouraged men to run away from the difficulties of life instead grappling with them, and emphasised the annihilation of the self as means of attaining union with the Ultimate Reality. This absorption and negation of the self led Muslims to adopt an otherworldly outlook and an attitude of renunciation of socio-political life. Iqbal was very much dissatisfied with this state of affairs. So he arrived at the solution of the political problems of the East, but a consistent philosophical basis of his message was as yet lacking. He wanted a comprehensive philosophy which should co-ordinate all the elements of his message and should serve as a vantage ground from which all problems about life could be solved. His acquaintance with the thoughts of great western philosophers as well as Muslim mystics works and teachings particularly the famous Persian mystic poet, Jalaluddin Rumi, helped him in developing such a philosophy and discovering a philosophical terminology for conveying his message for the political and spiritual emancipation of all the East, nay, of all the humanity. As a Muslim sage, Iqbal realised that the revival of man both as an individual and as a member of a social group can only come from the ultimate central principal of his being, namely, the Self or Ego. He, therefore, waged a constant war in his writings against the doctrine of self-negation and strongly criticised such an ideal of human life and as Reynold A. Nicholson has remarked, "developed a philosophy of his own" based on self-affirmation, under the unique name of Khudi. This is the third stage of Iqbal's development which "may be described as the stage of firm beliefs and well grounded conviction marked by a philosophical depth. In this phase of life, he achieved the maturity of thoughts; his philosophical quest reached its goal."

== Concept of Khudi ==
Iqbal’s poetry appeared in the twentieth century, a crucial time for the people of the sub-continent in the wake of British colonisation and World War I. He was deeply concerned with the revival of the lost identity and status of the Muslims. Iqbal was despaired with the Muslim religious-philosophic tradition of his time which he termed in The Reconstruction of Religious Thought in Islam as "worn out and practically dead metaphysics" with its peculiar thought form and phraseology producing "a deadening effect on the modern mind". His vibrant poetry stirred the dead into life and infused a renewing and rejuvenating sense of identity and self-manifestation in his readers. The Secrets of the Self (first published in 1915) marks the underpinning of a new stage in Iqbal’s creative work. It is linked with the turning point of Iqbal’s stance which took place after the poet’s homecoming from Europe. The poem contains Iqbal’s inventive doctrine of the self; and all the subsequent works of Iqbal supplemented and further refined this central concept. While dictating his views to Syed Nazeer Niazi in 1937, Iqbal explicitly stated that the poem is based on two principles: (a) that the personality is the central fact of the universe; (b) that personality "I am" is the central fact in the constitution of man.

The first principle is described in the Old Testament "as the great I am". The second principle of the smaller or dependent I-am is various described in Quran as weak or ignorant yet it is also described as the bearer of the Divine trust, it has the quality of growth as well as corruption, it has the power to expand by absorbing the elements of the universe of which it appears to be an insignificant part, it has also the power of absorbing the attributes of God (Wahid Thoughts and Reflection of Iqbal). This personal observation of Iqbal serves as a gateway to the landscapes of meaning. The dominant idea that Iqbal emphasises is that knowing oneself is in fact an immediate perception of God. He focuses his attention on the individual "I", thus shifting the emphasis from divine to human. The path of recognition of the self is the path that takes one to a contact with the Absolute. As he writes in introduction to The Secrets of the Self translated by Nicholson: Physically and spiritually man is self-contained centre, but he is yet a complete individual. The greater his distance from God, the less is his individuality. He who comes nearest to God is the complete person. Nor that he is finally absorbed in God. On the contrary he absorbs God in himself. Subverting the traditional concept of mystical experience, Iqbal transfigured it as the fully developed self that does not dissolve even when the reality is seen face to face in mystical experience. And what he actually means by the idea of "absorbing God in himself" is to cultivate and create the attributes of God and by doing this "the man becomes unique by becoming more and more like the most unique individual". It is only after self-realisation that the real meaning and purpose of human existence becomes more clear. In psychology, the Humanistic school with its most prominent figure Maslow recognises this human potential for self actualisation. Maslow defines self-actualisation as: Ongoing actualisation of potentials, capacities and talents, as fulfillment of mission (or call, fate, destiny or vocation), as fuller knowledge of, and acceptance of, the person’s own intrinsic nature, as an unceasing trend towards unity, integration or synergy within the person. Maslow postulated a hierarchical theory that is often represented as a pyramid, with the lower levels representing lower needs, and the upper point representing the need for self-actualisation. Susan Cloninger explains in Theories of Personality: understanding Persons: "This hierarchy consists of five levels: four levels of deficiency motivation and a final, highly developed level called being motivation or self-actualisation." Maslow divides these needs into two main classes: D-Needs and B-Needs: D-Needs mean that whenever there is deficiency in the fulfillment of these needs there is a motivation to eliminate them. B-Needs are the self actualising needs concerned with the need to know Truth. Maslow saw human needs arranged like a ladder. The highest one is the need for self-actualisation but that cannot be reached without stepping the other needs of this ladder. The most basic needs, at the bottom, are physical air, water, food, sex. Then there are the safety and psychological needs for belonging, love and acceptance. At the top are the need for self-actualisation the need to fulfill oneself and the experience at this stage gained can be called as "peak experience". According to it, "peak experiences" are profound mystical moments of love, understanding, happiness or rapture, when a person feels more whole, alive, self-sufficient and yet a part of the world, more aware of truth, justice, harmony, goodness and so on. Maslow’s hierarchy of needs is based on the universal fact about human nature. Man’s spiritual needs are undeniable and without moral and ethical concepts life is empty. There is a lot of truth in the maxim that "man does not live by bread alone"; though the converse is much true and as much applicable that man cannot live without bread. The human self can develop and prosper only when his basic needs are properly and adequately supplied. He must have sufficient clothing and a house to live. These are the primary adjuncts of life and their absence retards the growth of the self. These are the basic physical demands and the need for these is not only pressing but universal. Iqbal also takes into consideration the importance of these needs. He does not deny them as is the case with the traditional mysticism based on asceticism. As study of Iqbal’s poetry and prose reveals that he believes that the individual has potential to develop his personality to its full capacity. The society plays a dominant role in developing human personality. The self cannot develop in vacuum. Iqbal states in Reconstruction of Religious Thought in Islam: It is our reflective contact with the temporal flux of things which train us for an intellectual vision of the non-temporal. Reality lives in its own appearances, and such a being as man, who has to maintain his life in an obstructing environment, cannot afford to ignore the visible. Iqbal emphasises the paramount place of the physical world in an effort to realise the spiritual ideal of growth of the selfhood. Iqbal’s whole conception of the growth of the selfhood consists of three levels: iv- the self and "I am ness (intrapersonal) v- the self and the other (interpersonal) vi- the self and God (transpersonal)"

These levels have been wonderfully described by Iqbal in Javid Nama in an excerpt that he himself placed at the end of his philosophic masterpiece The Reconstruction of Religious Thought in Islam:

Art thou in the stage of "life", "death" or "death-in-life",
Invoke the aid of three witnesses to verify thy station,
The first witness is thine own consciousness see thyself, then with thine own light,
The second witness is the consciousness of another ego- See thyself, then with the light of an ego other than thee,
See thyself then with God’s light- If thou standest unshaken in front of this light,
Consider thyself as living and eternal as He!
That man only is real who dares,
Dares to see God face the face.
No one can stand unshaken in His presence;
And he who can, verily, he is pure gold,
Art thou a mere particle of dust?
Tighten the knot of thy ego;
Rechisel then, thine ancient frame;
And build up a new being.
Such being is real being;
Or else thy ego is mere ring of smokes.

The first level of the self and "I am ness" can be likened to the first (lowermost) level of psychological needs in Maslow’s Hierarchy of Needs. At this level the self is just conscious of its own self. This "I am ness" marks the first awakening of the self. The self cannot think beyond itself until and unless the physiological needs are satisfied. In this connection, Maslow’s observation is worth mentioning: When the body has an absolute, unsatisfied needs for food, all other needs will be pushed into background, such a state may even change a person’s view of the future, for the seriously hungry person, freedom, love, community, feeling, respect, philosophy and so on may all be waved aside and the person may think if only he or she is guaranteed food for the rest of life, happiness will be complete. But once hunger is satisfied the person will immediately begin to think of other needs. So these needs are indispensable for the body to function. According to Maslow’s theory, the other level of "the self and the other" can be linked to psychological and social needs. After the station of the biological or physiological needs, the self yearns for security and stability. Here, at this level, the self is able to recognise the other that is to see oneself in the light of the other. When physiological and safety needs are fairly satisfied as Maslow suggests, "People have belongingness and love needs, they feel the need that they belong somewhere instead of being transient or newcomers. Relatedness is a need of belongingness, which starts from our natural ties with our mother and reaches to universal comradeship with all human beings. In his book Iqbal Today, Dr. Nazir Qaiser relates the idea: This need is behind all phenomenon which constitute the whole gamut of intimate human relation of all passions which are called love in the broadest sense of the word, there is only one passion which satisfies man’s need to unite himself with the world, and to acquire at the same time a sense of integrity and individuality and this is love. The development of the self does not take place in a void or seclusion. Iqbal also affirms this universal comradeship with all human beings in the following verse cited by Nazir Qaiser in Iqbal Today: The third level of "the self and God" is the recognition of God---to see oneself in the light of God. This level can be linked to the "Need of self-actualisation" in Maslow’s theory. When all other needs are satisfied, Maslow states: "A new discontent and restlessness will develop unless the individual is doing he individually is fitted for. A musician must make music, an artist must paint, a poet must write". So in Maslow’s terms, at the level of self-actualisation, an individual is liable to explore his creative potential. This sense of creativity makes him a co-worker with God in Iqbal’s terms. For Iqbal, the self-actualisation is the cultivation of God in human self. Dr. Javed Iqbal writes in this connection: "Iqbal through the constant strengthening of ego (self) expects man to become a Divine Being in creating a more perfect universe". It is the pinnacle of self-actualisation and self-realisation that endows the self with the moments of great awe, understanding and rapture as characterised by Maslow. Peak experiences may be creative periods or they may be of contemplative nature. Maslow explains: During a peak experience, the individual not only experiences an expansion of self but also a sense of unity and meaningfulness in his/her existence. For that moment the world appears to be complete, and he or she is at one with it. After the experience is over and the person has returned to the routine of everyday living, the quality that transforms one’s understanding so that things do not seem to be quite the same afterward. Iqbal’s "Perfect Man" at the highest level of self-realisation attains a spiritual power. The absorption of the Divine attributes makes the Perfect Man closer to God. Dr. Anne Marrie Schimmel rightly observes: "The faithful who has realised in himself the Divine call, and who has consolidated ego (self) so much that he is able to have a person to person encounter with his creator is, for Iqbal, the Perfect Man, the Free Man". He is capable of getting himself in tuned to the Higher Reality in mystical experience. Iqbal delineates the dimensions of such an experience in Reconstruction of Religious Thought in Islam in detail: The mystic state brings us into contact with the total passage of Reality in which all the diverse stimuli merge into one another and form a single unanalysable unity in which the ordinary distinction of subject and object does not exist, the mystic state is a moment of intimate association with a unique other self. So the self attains its highest goal by becoming deeply related to God, making possible a union of the temporal and the eternal. He then knows that the world has been created for him and he is for the world. His self-knowledge makes him more involved into the worldly matters. Iqbal expounds this onward marching of the self towards its realisation very comprehensively in The Secrets of the Self. In ongoing pages, this growth of the self would be traced in Iqbal’s poem.

In The Secrets of the Self, Iqbal has pictured the infinite potentialities of the human self. He formulates the hierarchic stages in which it can be achieved. "In the poem he has defined what an individual life is, what is its motive power, in what way it should be developed, what is its goal, and how that goal is to be reached". The creative unfolding of the human self is at the heart of Iqbal’s concept of self in the poem. At the start of the poem, Iqbal invites the readers and gives a call for realisation of the selfhood:

This bell calls other travelers to take the road,
No one hath told the secret which I will tell or threaded a pearl of thought like mine come,
if thou would’st know the secret of everlasting life!
Come, if thou would’st win both earth and heaven!
Heaven taught me this lore,
I cannot hide if from comrades.

In a confident and candid tone, the poet invites the readers to taste the secret of eternal life that lies in the realisation of selfhood. Moreover, he is certain and sure of the fact that the "bell" he is ringing would be responded positively and this assurance comes from his own strength that he has gathered after mastering self. The use of the word "comrades" again reminds one of Whitman’s use of the same word with the spirit of fraternity and bond of love that binds and holds the whole creation and brings them on one level. After his motivating and inspiring call, Iqbal prepares the reader for an entry into the process of the realisation of selfhood.

And advance hotly on a new quest,
And become known as the champion of a new spirit;
Take a draught of love’s pure wine.
Strike the chords of thine heart and rouse of tumultuous strain.

Here Iqbal has given a clue to the reader that the pathway to the realisation of the self is demanding and it calls for a life of action and love. Iqbal also explains it in the introductory note to The Secrets of the Self:

Personality is a state of tension and can continue only if that state is maintained, if the state of tension is not maintained, relaxation will ensue, that which tends to maintain the state of tension tends to make us immortal. He has firm faith in the hidden potentiality of the self. Using beautiful similes he poses a deep-seated faith in the expansion of the self:

When a drop of water gets of self’s lesson by heart,
It makes its worthless existence a pearl.
And when the grass found a means of growth in its self,
Its aspiration clove the breast of the garden.

It is this consciousness of the self that makes a particle of dust shine like star, a drop of water radiates and sparkles like a pearl and makes a delicate leave of grass sprout through hard ground. When once this consciousness manifests itself, the self moves forward to a continual expansion. When the self becomes conscious of its significance, it moves one step further to the stage of awakening of the self. In Iqbal’s poetry, awakening of the self is characterised by burning the passion of desire and the creation of ideals. Purpose and desire are seminal for the growth of the self towards actualisation and realisation. Iqbal also emphasises it in Reconstruction of Religious Thought in Isalm: Life is only a series of acts of attention, and an act of attention is inexplicable without reference to a purpose, conscious or unconscious. Even acts of perception are determined by our immediate interests and purposes. Thus ends and purposes, whether they exist as conscious or sub-conscious tendencies form the warp and woof of conscious experience. Hence purpose preserves the life of the self:

Its (self) origin is hidden in desire,
Keep desire alive in thy heart,
Lest thy little dust become a tomb
Desire keeps the self in perpetual uproar,
It is restless wave of the self’s sea
Negation of desires is death to the living,
Even as absence of heat extinguishes the flame,
Rise intoxicated with the wine of an ideal,
An ideal shining as the dawn.

The recognition of the self serves as a gateway to the noble objectives of existence. A burning passion of desire, a longing and yearning is required for the realisation of these objectives. Thus to Iqbal, awakening of the self means a life fraught with meaning, purpose and ideal; without it, is dreariness, decay and finally death. In Iqbal’s poetry awakening occurs through the burning passion of desire, the desire to explore, discover and bring to light the secrets and mysteries of existence. Yearning is therefore the soul of the world:

We live by forming ideal,
We glow in the sun-beams of desire.

According to Iqbal, desire is the spring from which the self draws sustenance. Dr. Raffat Hassan observes; "Iqbal calls desire by several names suz, hasrat, justuju. Desire is a creative power even when it remains unfulfilled". This awakening of the self with the burning passion of desire leads it to the process of purification. It purges itself with the magical power of love. The road to the self is the road of love. Only true love can instill faith in man’s soul and lead him to the deep apprehension of the Divine:

The luminous point whose name is the self,
Is the life-spark beneath our dust.
By love it is made more lasing,
More living, more burning, more glowing.
From love proceeds the radiance of its being,
And the development of its unknown possibilities,
Its nature gathers fire from love.

In the philosophy of Iqbal, love is a much broader passion. It is the greatest force in human life, and essence and nectar of life that can obliterate death. Iqbal uses the term "Ishq" for it. Ishq is the higher form of love. Iqbal explains "Ishaq" in "Reconstruction of Religious Thought in Islam as: The desire to assimilate, values and ideals and the endeavour to realise them. Love individualises the lover as well as the beloved." The effort to realise the most unique individuality individualises the seeker and implies the individuality of the sought, for nothing else would satisfy the nature of the seeker. So by love the self comprehends all the implications of Reality. After the nourishment of desire, love of purpose mobilises all the resources of the self to achieve the object of desire. The love of ideal thus keeps alive the desire and purifies the self of all other petty concerns by inculcating the singleness of purpose. In Iqbal’s metaphysics, love always has an ideal, for example; Prophet Muhammad is one major ideal for Muslim lover to attain:

In the Moslem’s heart is the home of Muhammad,
All our glory is from the name of Muhammad.

And this love of the Prophet leads to the love of God:

Be a lover constant in devotion to thy beloved,
That thou mayst cast thy noose and capture God.

Hence the strength and potency of the self depends on the degree and depth of love. If one is steadfast in love, one can win all things and even "capture God". The self further strengthened and purified by love then illuminates with an eternal light. It becomes one with the Divine Reality, The Self:

When the self I made strong by love,
Its power rules the whole world,
Its hand becomes God’s hand,
The moon is split by its fingers.

Here Iqbal alludes to a well known miracle of the Prophet also mentioned in Quran (Ch. 54, V. 1). It is the beauty of Iqbal’s poem that here this growth of the selfhood does not remain a poetic experience but he does prove its validity from the true historical instances. For Iqbal love is the desire to assimilate and absorb; so it is the love of God that ultimately involves absorption of the Divine Individuality by the self. It demands the assimilation of the attributes of God within the self. It brings out the creative potential of self. In the next part of the poem Iqbal describes some further stages of growth of selfhood. He further tells that the self should be educated and trained in order to become perfect. It has to go through three stages. The self cannot be left unbridled. It must first cultivate the habit of obedience. Like camel the self should toil, and carry the burden of duty preservingly and with patience:

So wilt thou enjoy the best dwelling,
Place, which is with God.
Endeavour to obey, o heedless one!
Liberty is the fruit of compulsion.

Without proper self-restraint and commitment of obedience, the freedom enjoyed by the self leads him to astray. He gives the example of music that it is just a discordant sound without a mechanical compulsion and it is to this compulsion that music owes its strength and its magic-power. The whole idea is beautifully expressed thus:

The air becomes fragrant when it is imprisoned in the flower bud;
The perfume becomes musk when it is confined in the navel of the musk-dear.
The music is a controlled soul,
When the control is gone,
the music is tuned into noise.

The second stage that the self must pass through in order to become disciplined and strong is self-control. Iqbal emphasises:

He that does not command himself
Becomes a receiver of commands from others.

Iqbal believes that belief in God and His commandments confers self-control. The belief, that there is no supreme power in the world except God, safeguards the self against a submission to fear of different kinds. The third and the final stage of the development of the development of the self is Divine viceregency that is attained when the self, as Iqbal explains in Reconstruction of Religious Thought in Islam, achieves a free personality, not by freeing himself from the fetters of law but by discovering the ultimate source of law within the depth of his consciousness". At this stage the self reaches what is practically the condition of "the infinite passing into the loving embrace of the finite". It is the final destination of the self, the absorption of the Ultimate Self into the self:

Tis Sweet to be God’s vicegerent in the world,
And exercise sway over the elements.
God’s vicegerent is as the soul of the universe,
His being is the shadow to the Greatest Name.

This stage of the vicegerency of God can be equated to the stage of mystical union with the Ultimate in case of Whitman. Though seemingly different ideas, their basic content is the same. In case of Whitman, it is the vision of the Absolute in mystical union that makes his self eternal and immortal and the most individual and unique. This confrontation with the Divine imbues him with the divine and superhuman power and Whitman assumes the role of the prophet. And here in Iqbal’s world, the culminating point of the selfhood is to cultivate the attributes of God within the self to achieve the status of vicegerency. For such a realised self Iqbal uses the term "Perfect Man". Iqbal’s "Perfect Man" with his fully developed self does not dissolve even when the Reality is seen face to face, Iqbal enumerates this idea in Reconstruction of Religious Thought in Islam as "The end of the ego’s quest is not emancipation from the limitations of individuality: it is, on the other hand, a more precise definition of it". So the highest hierarchic rank, the vicegerency of God is achieved when man is able, not to be absorbed by Him and lose his identity, but to absorb within himself as many of God’s attributes as possible. Iqbal interprets in his own manner the doctrine of the Perfect Man. It advocates that every man is potentially a microcosm and that when he has become spiritually perfect, all the Divine attributes are displayed by him:

His hidden being is Life’s mystery,
The unheard music of Life’s harp.
Nature travails in blood for generations,
To compose the harmony of his personality.
Appear, O rider of Destiny!
Appear, O light of the dark realm of change!
Illumine the scene of existence.

For a Perfect Man the blessing of the selfhood, with attainment of the highest stage, range from the conquest of destiny to the spiritual conquest of the universe. Dr. A Schimmel puts it this way: What he aims at, is not man as a measure of all things but as a being that grow the more perfect, the closer his connection with God is; it is man neither as an aesthetic superman who replaces a God who has died nor as the Perfect Man in the sense that he is but a visible aspect of God with whom he is essentially one, but man as realising the wonderful paradox of freedom and servant ship.

So this Perfect Man of Iqbal is not a super-man nor he should realise his inner power. This is the key feature of his dynamic Sufism that has a note of universality in it. His Perfect Man does exhibit the qualities of Maslow’s self-actualised person and Whitman’s "Divine Average" but does excel in the manifestation of his individuality and his spiritual ideal. "His Perfect Man is democratic in origin, is a spiritual principle based on the assumption that every human being is centre of latent power, the possibilities of which are developed by cultivating a certain type of character". His Perfect Man attains capacity to build a much vaster world in the depth of his own inner world and earns immortality through action and assertion rather than annihilation. Therefore, central to Iqbal’s drama in the poem is his concern with human individuality. His vision is reminder of the universal commonalities of human diversity and the creative powers that may well be the most unifying force in the global family.

== Nature of Khudi ==
=== Identification ===
Khudi, in the literary sense of the word means: Individuality or Iness. Iqbal uses the terms 'Ego' and 'Self' in synonymity with Khudi. To him self is also synonymous with 'Soul' which is a matter of common occurrence in Sufi literature. Human self or ego is the dominance of a particular self, subordinating and unifying all the other selves which constitute the mental life of man. Iqbal in his Lectures says: "The ego reveals itself as a unity of what we call mental states. Mental states do not exist in mutual isolation.They mean and involve one another. They exist as phases of a complex whole, called mind." Iqbal’s choice of the word Khudi raised a storm of protests. As Schimmel writes it was understandable considering "the highly negative significance in Persian of the word Khudi, self, with its implications of selfishness, egotism and similar objectionable meanings". Iqbal was aware of this and admitted that the word Khudi was chosen with great difficulty and most reluctantly because from a literary point of view it has many shortcomings and ethically it is generally used in a bad sense both in Urdu and Persian. Iqbal tells that he wanted a colorless word for self, having no ethical significance. He says, "As far as I know there is no such word in either Urdu or Persian.....Considering the requirements of verse, I thought that the word Khudi was the most suitable, also because there is.....some evidence in the Persian language of the word Khudi in the simple sense of self, i.e. to say the colorless fact of the 'I'. Thus metaphysically the word Khudi is used in the sense of that indescribable feeling, I which forms the basis of the uniqueness of each individual."

=== Undeniable Reality ===
To Iqbal Khudi is a fact and not an illusion. It is neither an abstract thought nor an idea. He says, "If you say that 'I' is a mere imagination; And its appearance is mere appearance; Then tell me, who is it that entertains these imagination; Just look within and think what this appearanceis." Again, Iqbal says that inner experience is the self or ego at work. He says, "we appreciate the ego itself in the act of perceiving, judging, and willing." To him the main purpose of the Quran is to awaken in man "the higher consciousness of his manifold relations with God and the universe." And this 'higher consciousness' in not possible without the self. Further, as R. A. Nicholson maintains, the capacity for action which is vehemently advocated by Iqbal "depends ultimately on the conviction that Khudi is real and is not merely an illusion of the mind." In Javid Nama Iqbal gives due importance to self-recognition and asserts that the consciousness can testify your state. He says, "Life means to adorn oneself in ones self, To desire to bear witness to one's own begin; Whether you be alive, or dead, or dying-For this seek witness from three witnesses. The first witness is self-consciousness, To behold oneself in one's own light; The second witness is the consciousness of another, To behold oneself in another's light; The third witness is the consciousness of God's essence, To behold oneself in the light God's essence."

=== Dependent Reality ===
To Iqbal also Khudi is not an independent reality. God, the infinite Ego, is the source of life for finite ego which can maintain its existence only as long as it is in contact with this All- Embracing Divine Khudi. He says, "The self has existence from the existence of God, The Self has show from the showing of God, I do not know where this splendid pearl, Would be, if there be no ocean". The same idea expressed in the Lectures: "Like pearls we live and move and have our being in the perpetual flow of Divine Life. This Khudi, born in the heart of the Infinite Khudi, developing in him and yet distinct from Him, unable to exist without Him, but also unable to be non-existent in His Presence. It is like a secret in the breast of the world. He says, "Our breath is a stray breaker from His sea.His breath makes music in our souls, His flutes. Grown by the stream-brink of Eternity, We draw the sap from it through our grass-roots." Iqbal has deeply felt this mutual attraction between God and man, the longing of that loving and living Khudi which man calls God, and in many of his poetical prayers he has referred to this highest experience in verses: "A lute, played by you, I make melody. You are my soul and yet outside my soul. A lamp, I burn with Your flame;else I die. How are you, O my Life, outside of me? And again : "whom do you seek? why are you so perturbed? For He is manifest and you concealed. Seek Him and you will only see your Self Seek your Self; you will find but Him revealed."

=== Universal Reality ===
Iqbal believes that Khudi is a real and pre-eminently significant entity which is the center and basis of entire organisation of life and has various features and stages of development. The achievement of a profounder Khudi is not confined to man alone. He says: "Throughout the entire gamut of being runs the gradually rising note of egohood until it reaches its perfection in man, that is why Quran declares the Ultimate Ego to be nearer to man than his own neck vein". In the first part of his Asrar under the title of "showing that the system of the universe originates in the self, and that the continuation of the life of all individuals depends on strengthening the self", he says: "The form of existence is an effect of the self, Whatsoever thou seest is a secret of the self. When the self awoke to consciousness, It revealed the universe of thought. A hundred words are hidden in its essence: Self-affirmation brings Not- self to light....Tis the nature of the self to manifest itself: In every atoms lumbers the might of the Self." Starting with the individual ego as the center of will and energy, Iqbal develops his philosophical system- his conception of God, conception of time, individual, freedom, will and immortality. According to him every object possesses an individuality in the scale of life and the status of every object is fixed according to the extent it develops its individuality and gains mastery over the entire environment. He says, "Every thing is preoccupied with self-expression, Every atom a candidate for greatness. Life without this impulse spells death, By the perfection of his individuality man becomes like God. The force of individuality makes the mustard seed into a mountion, Its weakness reduces the mountion into a mustard seed. Thou alone art the Reality in this Universe, All the rest is a mirage."

=== Standard of Valuation ===
To Iqbal, the criterion of the degree of reality of any living organism is the extent to which it has achieved the feeling of a distinct Khudi: He says, "Only that truly exist which can say 'I am'. It is the degree of the intuition of I-am-ness that determines the place of a thing in the scale of being". Thus the idea of Khudi gives us a standard of value. He says, "It settles the problem of good and evil. That which fortifies personality is good, that which weakens it is bad. Art, religion, and ethics must be judged from the stand- point of personality." In his Asrar, Iqbal reverts to this theme again and again, and finds out the true meaning of the evolutionary process in this striving towards the achievement of a fuller and richer Khudi. He says, "Inasmuch as the life of the universe comes from the power of the self, Life is in proportion to this power. When a drop of water gets of self-slesson by heart, It makes its worthless existence a pearl. Wine is form less because its self is weak; It receives a form by favour of the cup. When the mountain loses its self, it turns into sands, And complains that the sea surges over it.When the grass found a means of growth in its self, Its aspiration clove the breast of the garden. When life gathers strength from the self, The river of life expands into an ocean". The reality of the khudi is denied by pantheists. They regard the physical world as non-existed and unreal. Iqbal believes that such denial of the khudi taught by Hindu intellectualism and Islamic pantheism have led Muslims to inaction and destroyed the spirit of creativity in them. He, therefore, "throws himself with all his might against idealistic philosophers and pseudo-mystical poets, the authors, in his opinion, of the decay prevailing in Islam, and urges that only by self-affirmation, self-expression, and self-development can the Moslems once more become strong and free." Explaining his Ideal of self-preservation as against self-negation, Iqbal, in his Asrar narrates the story of a thirsty bird who saw a glistering diamond and thought it to be water. But as he approached it and tried to drink, he found that it was as hard as stone. For, it had enriched its being and fortified its self. Being disappointed, that bird proceeded farther and saw a dew-drop. It rushed at it once and drank it up. As the self of the dew-drop was not strong and fortified and it had a very frail being. It was obliterated from the existence easily. Iqbal draws the following lesson from this story: "Never for an instant neglet self-reservation, Be a diamond, not a dew-drop. Save thyself by affirmation of self, Compress thy quicksilver into silver one, Produce a melody from the string of self; Make manifest the secrets of self. Discussing the declaration of Hallaj Anal Haq 'I am the Creative Truth' Iqbal points out that the true interpretation of human experience "is not the drop slipping into the sea but the realisation and bold affirmation in an undying phase of the reality and permanence of the human ego in a profounder personality". He says, "It is not the goal of our journey, To merge ourselves in his ocean. If you catch hold of him, it is not Fana (extinction). It is impossible for an ego to be absorbed in another ego. For the ego to be itself is its perfections." To Iqbal Fana 'does not mean annihilation of the khudi. A. Schimmel truly depicts the picture of Iqbal's view of Fana: "The idea of fana, which has been taken in the meaning of obliteration, annihilation of the self is completely unaccepted to Iqbal....Essentially it is the annihilation of human qualities and their substitution by more sublimated, even divine qualities, according to the prophetical tradition, Takhallaqu bi-Akhlaq-i-Allah,'Create in yourselves the attributes of God'." Thus man becomes unique by becoming more and more like the most unique Individual. In his Ba l-i-Jibril Iqbal says: "The manifestation of the Egohood spell Prophethood, The solitudes of the Egohood spell Godhood; The earth, the heavens, the Divine seat, Nay, the entire kingdom of God is the grasp of the Egohood." He further says: "The end of the egos quest is not emancipation from the limitations of individuality; it is on the other hand, a more precise definition of it." For Iqbal, the test of egos development is the retention of individuality. The development reaches its climax when the ego is able to retain full self-possession, even in the case of a direct contact with the all-embracing ego." Iqbal here gives the example of the holy Prophets ascension when he viewed the very essence of God and retained his own self. He says, "That man alone is real who dares; Dares to see God face to face. No one can stand unshaken in His presence; And he who can, verily, he is pure gold."

== Growth and Evolution ==
To Iqbal, Khudi is a universal reality on which the essence of every creature, in the whole system of existence, depends. Besides all living organisms also are struggling to achieve a more complex and perfect Khudi. As Iqbal opines: "This gradually rising of note of ego-hood, runs throughout the entire gamut of being till it reaches its perfection in man." Of all the living creatures, however, man has achieved the highest measure of individuality and is most conscious of his own reality, but he is not yet a complete individual. Khudi has the quality of growth as well as the quality of corruption. The greater his distance from God, the less his individuality. He who comes nearest to God is the completest person. He says, "Give not away one particle of the glow you have, Knot tightly together glow within you; Fairer it is to increase one's glow, Fairer it is to test oneself before the sun; Then chisel a new the crumbled form; Make proof of yourself; be a true being! Only such an existent is praiseworthy, Otherwise the fire of life is mere smoke. It was by way of birth, excellent man, That you came into this dimensioned world; By birth it is possible also to escape, It is possible to loosen all fetters from, oneself." Khudi has capacity to absorb the elements of the universe and the attributes of God. On the other hand, it can also degenerate to the level of matter. Thus it is of the highest importance in the evolution of man to study the factors and forces which strengthen or weaken Khudi. In this part of the article, the chief factors which fortify Khudi will be examined.

=== Love ===
Iqbal lays great emphasis on the value of love for strengthening Khudi. To him love for an individual means the assimilation and absorption of the characteristics prominent in the beloved. Although Iqbal s prose and poetry are imbued of the description of the concept of love, but no words and statements can portrait a proper picture of that as he understood it. Referring to love he says in a letter to professor Nicholson: "This word is used in a very wide sense and means the desire to assimilate, to absorb. Its highest form is the creation of values and ideals and the endeavor to realise them. Love individualises the lover as well as the beloved. The effort to realise the most unique individuality individualises the seeker and implies individuality of the sought, for nothing else would satisfy the nature of the seeker." Iqbal has described the connection between love and Khudi in these lines: "The luminous point whose name is the self, Is the life – spark beneath our dust. By love it is made more lasting, More living, more burning, more glowing. From love proceeds the radiance of its being, And the development of its unknown possibilities. Its nature gathers fire from love, Love instructs it to illumine the world". In Gabriel's Wing, visiting the 'Mosque of Cordoba', Iqbal pays tribute to love in the highest possible terms: "Love is Gabriel's breath, love is mohamads strong heart. Love is the envoy of God, love is the utterance of God. Even our mortal clay, touched by love's ecstasy glows; Love is a new-pressed wine, love is the goblet of kings. Love's is the plectrum that draws music from lifes taut strings-Love's is the warmth of life, love's is the radiance of life." Addressing to love as the secret of our heart and as our sowing and harvest, asks it since these earthly spirits have too aged grown, come and bring another adam out of our clay. The strength and potency of our faith depend on the degree depth of love. Love transcends man to the highest plane of the existence which is the Vicegerency of God on earth. He says, "Be a lover constant in devotion to thy beloved, That thou mayst cast thy noose and capture God. By the might of love evoke an army, Reveal thyself on the farm of love. That the Lord of ka'ba may show thee favour, And make thee the object of the text, Lo, I will appoint a vicegerent on the earth." For Iqbal love's alchemy converts mans dross into gold. And, in deed it is something more than elixir since it turns all baser passions into itself. Love is associated with kingdom and the lover is who has the double world controlled.

=== Desire ===
Throughout Iqbal's writings great stress is placed on desire or formation of new purposes and objects as the source from which the self gets nourishment. To him the life of the self depends on creating perpetual desires and ideals. By such a life he means one which knows no rest and show in a ceaseless manner new ideals and desires. It is through desires that our life becomes enthusiastic and dynamic. He says, "Life is preserved by purpose: Because of the goal its caravan bell tinkles. Life is latent in seeking, Its origin is hidden in desire, Keep desire alive in thy heart, Lest thy little dust become a tomb. Desire is the soul of this world of hue and scent, The nature of every thing is a store- house of desire. Desire keeps the self in perpetual uproar, It is a restless wave of the self's sea, Tis desire that enriches life." Iqbal calls desire several names such as suz, hasrat, Justuju, arzu, ishtiyaq and tamanna. They keep Khudi in everlasting pulsation." 'Tis the brand of desire makes the blood of man run warm, By the lamp of desire this dust is enkindled. By desire Life's cup is brimmed with wine, So that Life leaps to its feet and marches briskly on. Life is occupied with conquest alone, And the one charm for conquest is desire...." In Message from the East, Iqbal manifest himself as an exhaustible aspirant for beauty, creativity and self-realisation inspired by new vision and purposes. Life can be viewed as dynamic only when it is imbued with restless burning. Again he asks " what are social organisation, customs, and laws? What is the secret of the novel ties of science?" Then replies: "A desire which realised itself by its own strength and burst forth from the heart and took shape" Man has the capacity for endless yearning in his eyes. This capacity lifts him to a station where he would not change his position even with God.

=== Faqr ===
Faqr or isteghna and faqir or qalandar appear very frequently in the later writings of Iqbal. It plays a vital role in strengthening of Khudi. In Gabriel's Wing he points out to the fact: "When the sword of self is sharpened on the whetstone of faqr, The stroke of one soldier does the work of an army." In common usage today, a beggar is known as a faqir but in Iqbal's thought faqiri and beggary are diametrically opposed. A true faqir takes no dole even from God. A faqir not only does not accept charity, it is against the dignity of his state to complain about the hardness of his lot.

Iqbal is fully aware of different interpretations of the term: "There is a faqr which only teaches cunning to the hunter; There is a faqr which shows how man can conquer the word; There is a faqr which makes nations humbled and depressed; There is a faqr which endows the dust with the attributes of gold".

Iqbal rejects the attitude of self-negation influenced by pseudo-mysticism, and in contrary, advocates an alive and active presence of man in society which would lead him to conquest of the material world. But while advocating this, he is anxious that, man should control an inner attitude of detachment and superiority to his material possessions. This is the real sense of faqr which can save humanity against becoming a slave to worldly pleasures and temptations. To him faqir is not monk or an ascetic who lives a life of abstinence and renunciation, cut off from the rest of mankind. "The withdrawal from the world of matter is not the end of true renunciation; It means the conquest of the earth and the heavens;I wash my hands of the ascetics faqr, Which is not but poverty and grieving. The nation that has lost the wealth of Taimur's courage; Can neither cultivate faqr nor win an empire."

Iqbal regards the true and positive meaning of faqr as faqr-i-Quran and identifies it with dominion and kingship. It is the leader of leaders and the king of kings. In his words, crown, throne and army are all the miracles of faqr. Faqr endows a slave with the qualities of a master, releases him from every thing besides God, and enables him to conquest the mundane world. The spirit of the 'Lion of God', Ali, a paragon of the perfect Khudi is imbued with faqr.

=== Tolerance and Forbearance ===
Tolerance for other people's views and manners represents intellectual breath and spiritual expansion in khudi, and its cultivation is beneficial to any human society. It is obvious that if every member of a group is to develop his individuality to the fullest extent, intolerance will only lead to perpetual quarrels and conflicts. Iqbal remarks: "The principal of the ego-sustaining deed is respect for the ego in myself as well as in others."

Iqbal's tolerance is born of strength, not of weakness, it is the tolerance of man of strong faith who has fervently cherished convictions his own, but, on that very account, realises that respect is due to those of others. In this sense Iqbal believes in forbearance and tolerance as the basis of true humanism and genuine religious spirit. To his son he gives this advice: "Religion is a constant yearning for perfection, It begins in reverence and ends in love; It is a sin to utter hash words, for the believer and the unbeliever are alike children of God;What is Adamiyat? Respect for man, learn to appreciate the true worth of man; The man of love earns the ways of God, and is benevolent alike to the believer and the unbeliever." In his Gabriel's Wing, Iqbal expresses his respect for truth and love for mankind in a vivid sense: "The God-intoxicated Faqir is neither of the East nor of the West, I belong neither to Delhi nor Isfahan nor Samarkand. I speak out what I consider to be the truth, I am befooled neither by the mosque nor by the modern civilisation; Friends and strangers are both displeased with me, For I can not confuse deadly poison with sugar. How can a man who sees and understands truth, Confuse a mound of earth with Mount Damavand."

=== Action ===
Action is, indeed, in Iqbal's philosophy of Khudi the pivot of life. Khudi achieves its full status and realises its great destiny through a life of activity and creativity not one of renunciation and imitation. He says, "Do not content yourself with resting on the shore: The rhythm of life there is slow. Plunge in the sea and grapple with the waves Eternal life consists in struggling so." Iqbal is an enthusiastic advocate of the importance of activity and creativeness in life. In fact, all our creativeness comes through action and without creativity no progress is possible. Imitation surpasses the creative faculty of life. To imitate is merely to follow the doings of others in a passive way. Both inaction and imitation bring decay into khudi. Any relaxation on the part of human personality leads to harmful consequences. Iqbal therefore, writes, "personality is a state of tension and can continue only if that state is maintained. If the state of tension is not maintained, relaxation will ensue." Iqbal's poetry is imbued of this message, expressed beautifully in a hundred different way. "Sikandar said to khidar aptly: Dive into the stormy sea of life and strive against the waves. Why watch them from the shore? Jump in and die and be the more alive."

He says, "Do not tell me about that silly moth, Who met an easy, suicidal death. It is the hardly moth that I admire, The one who bravely fights with his last breath". Using another simile- that of the coal and the diamond-Iqbal brings out clearly the difference between a raw and mature Khudi. He says, "Because thy being is immature, thou hast become abased; Because thy body is soft, thou art burnt. Be void of fear, grief and anxiety; Be hard as a stone, be a diamond. Whoever strives hard and holds tight; The two worlds are illumined by him. In firmness consists the glory of life; Weakness is worthlessness and immaturity."

Iqbal uses the term Sual i.e. 'asking' in the sense of inaction, dependence on others, the slavish imitation of their ideas and culture. He says: "As love fortifies the ego asking-sual-weakens it. All that is achieved without personal effort comes under Sual. The son of a rich man who inherits his father's wealth is an 'asker'; so is every one who thinks the thoughts of other." Iqbal's poetry gives this message that, unless individuals as well as the community develop self-reliance and evolve the inner richness of their own being, their potentialities will remain wraped and repressed, in a variety of beautiful forms. He says, "Asking disintegrates the Self, And deprives of illumination the Sinai-bush of the Self. By asking poverty is made more abject; By begging the beggar is made poorer."

=== Courage ===
Iqbal believes that the cultivation of an attitude of courage is essential for the proper education of character. Just as creativity and originality strengthen the khudi, release its potential capacity for great needs, fear, which is the negation of them, weakens it and becomes the source of all kinds of corruption in the individual character. He says, "Grief, like a lancet, pierces the soul's vein...Fear, save of God, is the dire enemy of works, The high way man that plundereth life's caravan. Purpose most resolute, when fear attends, thinks upon. What may be, and lofty zeal to circumspection yields. Or let its seed be sown within thy soil, Life remains stunted of its full display. Whatever evil lurks within thy heart, Thou canst be certain that its origin Is fear :fraud, cunning, malice, lies-all these flourish on terror." The impact of courage on developing of Khudi in Iqbal's thought is so high that he identifies the fear with the veiled idolatory-shirk-i-khafi- and as Saiyidain remarks: "Courage can be cultivated as an attribute of character by making Tawhid an active working principle of conduct. This, according to Iqbal, implies a rejection of all fears except the fear of God... and an attitude to manly defiance towards all other powers which may threaten to arrest our legitimate human rights." He says, "The fear of God faiths only preface is, All other fear is secret disbelief", "who understands the Perophets clue aright, Sees infidelity concealed in fear."

=== Suffering ===
Suffering is included in the concept of faqr and is associated very closely with action, and struggle. Iqbal observes that "no religious system can ignore the moral value of suffering...Suffering is a gift from the gods in order to make man see the whole life." In Iqbal's view, means to live in danger, and he considers active life and strife as two of the elements strengthen Khudi and help it to unfold its possibilities. So "evil and suffering are only a whetstone of man who struggles with them, conquers them and makes them eventually obedient servants to his will, embodying their powers into his own self." He says, "The Self becomes more mature though suffering, Until the Self rends the veils that cover God. The God-seeing man sees himself only through God; Crying 'one God', he quivers in his own blood. To quiver in blood is a great honour for love, Saw, stave and halter-these are love's feastival. Upon the road of love, whatever betides is good; Then welcome to the unloving kindnesses of the Beloved."

As Schimmel writes: Iqbal's idea that the more developed the ego is, the better it can stand the heaviest shocks without being destroyed, and can even survive the shock of corporeal death, may be is taken from popular piety, namely, that God showers down afflictions on those whom he prefers. In this regard Iqbal "has often reminded his readers of the old symbol which had been frequently used by Rumi: to cast oneself upon the fire like rue:rue and aloe-wood exhale sweet perfumes when burnt-thus man, in the fire of trials and sufferings can prove that he is more than an ordinary log and show unexpected spiritual riches."

In The Call of the Marching Bell, again Iqbal refers to the vital role of grief and suffering for the maturity of Khudi and consider them as the lamp of the heart; an adornment of the spirit's mirror; and a silent song of the spirit which is entwined with the melody of the lute of life. It will be noticed that many of the factors mentioned represent the positive and negative of the same pictures. For example, if a man acts with courage he is discarding fear, a man who lives an active efforts and creativity disdains any form of imitation and comfort. It is very difficult to keep the benign and malign factors influencing the development of khudi in water tight compartments. All these forces act and react and tend to mix together along the boundary. Here just the most important of them have been detailed separately for the sake of elucidation and right emphasis.

== Stages of Education ==
By encouraging influences which fortify Khudi, and by avoiding those which lead to its weakening, khudi grows from strength to strength until it reaches the highest stage of perfection. In this evolutionary process it has to pass through three stages.

1. Obedience to Law. (Eta'at)
2. Self-Control. (Dabt-i-Nafs)
3. Divine Vicegerency. (Niyabat-i-Ilahi)

=== Obedience to Law ===
Obedience to law and self-control also play a great part in the fortification of khudi, but Iqbal prefers to regard them as representing milestones on the upward march towards the goal -Naab-. To a khudi that is properly disciplined and suitably fortified, the first stage is represented by a phase where obedience to the law conies unconsciously. Khudi has no conflicts to face so far as the law is concerned. Iqbal likens the state of khudi in the first stage to a camel that its ways are patience and perseverance and its traits are service and toil. He eats seldom sleeps little and noiselessly steps along the standy track until reaches his rider to the journey's end. Then while hinting to this verse of Quran: "Those who believe and do righteous deeds: there is blessedness and a fair resort". He says: "Thou, too, do not refuse the burden of Duty.So will thou enjoy the best dwelling -place which is with God.Endeavour toobey.O needless one!Liberty is the fruit of compulsion.By obedience the man of no worth is made worthy, By disobedience his fire turned to ashes.Whose would master the sun and starts, Let him make himself a prisoner of Law! Do not complain of the hardness of the law. Do not transgress the statues of Muhammad!"

=== Self-Control ===
On the other hand, obedience to Law, along with other benign forces, tends to school khudi for the second evolutionary phase where it attains perfect self-control. Self-control in its turn prepares khudi for the final stage i.e. Divine Vicegerency. In this stage one has to govern himself by himself, the nobler part of nature. He that does not command himself becomes a receiver of commands from others. The individual should fear no one but God. He should also not have attachment with worldly things." Thy soul cares only for itself, like the camel: It is self-conceited, self- governed, and self-willed. Be a man, get its halter into thine hand, that thou mayst become a pearl albeit thou art a potter's vessel. He that does not command himself, become a receiver of commands from others. Draw might from the litany "O Almighty one!" that thou mayst ride the camel of thy body.

=== Divine Vicegerency ===
Divine Vicegerency is the third and highest stage in the development of khudi. According to him, the purpose of God in creating man was to place His own vicegerency or representative upon earth. Every man is potentially the vicegerent of God, but he has to realise this status manifestly. Iqbal believes that one who can rule his body, can also rule the whole world. He says, "He is the completes Ego, the goal of humanity, the acume of life both in mind and body." Iqbal further tells that the nai'b is the synthesis of power and knowledge, thought and action, instinct and reason. "He is the last fruit of the tree of humanity, and all the trials of a painful evolution are justified because he is to come at the end." His kingdom is the kingdom of God on earth. In his Asrar he describes him in the following lines: "Tis sweet to be God's vicegerent in the world, And exercise sway over the elements. God's vicegerent is as the soul of the universe. His being is the shadow of the Greatest Name. He knows the mysteries of part and whole, He executes the command of Allah in the world...He is the final cause of "God taught Adam the names of all things." He is the inmost sense of "Glory to Him that transported His servant by night... Appear, O rider of Destiny! Appear, O light of the dark realm of change. Mankind are the cornfield and thou the harvest, Thou art the goal of life's caravan." Whilst rules and stages of development of khudi are laid down above, khudi can develop fully only in association with other khudi and not in isolation. The vicegerent has to work in cooperation with others to bring about the kingdom of God on earth. And he can not exist independently of the group to which he belongs: "The link that binds the individual to the Society a Mercy is: His truest Self in the community, Alone achieves fulfillment. Wherefore be so far as in thee lies in close report, With thy society and luster bring. To the wide intercourse of free-born men. He wins respect as being one of them. And the society is recognised. As by comprising many such as he. When in the congregation he is lost. Tis like a drop which, seeking to expand, becomes an ocean. Self negatesitself in the community, that it may be no more a petal, but a rosary."

In deed Iqbal's philosophy of khudi is thought valid also for the whole community of faithful, since according to him a nation is, just as the individual an khudi, and has to follow the same lines of conduct as the individual does. Iqbal, therefore, applies the same factors and forces which are required for the growth and strength of khudi i.e. love, desire, effort, etc.not only to the individual but as well to the nation. In the Rumuz-i-Bekhudi where he develops in full his ideas on nationhood he compares the national khudi to that of a child which develops slowly until it can say ‘I’. "His eye prehensile lights upon himself, His little hand clutched to his breast, he cries 'I'!. This newborn 'I' the inception is of life. This the true song of life's awaking lute."

== Hallaj and Prophetic Perfection ==
The life and thought of Al-Hallaj (858-922) has been the object of much reflection and debate in Islamic history. Many Sufis argued that Hallaj had successfully annihilated his self and that it was the divine principle speaking when he stated, "Anal Haq", ("I am the Truth.") Iqbal felt that this was a mistaken interpretation which was the result, initially, of Neoplatonism, and later on of Ibn Arabi’s school of thought. This school emphasised the doctrine of wahdat al-wujud, or the "unity of being". This pantheistic philosophy entailed that everything is immersed in God. Through this interpretation, God’s pure transcendence was diminished. In contrast to interpreting Hallaj’s utterance from such a perspective of ‘itissal, or union, "[Louis] Massignon...succeeded in showing that in the theology of Hallaj, God’s pure transcendence is maintained." Iqbal, used this interpretation to support his thesis on the individuality and personality of the self. He wrote, The contemporaries of Hallaj, as well as his successors, interpreted [his] words pantheistically, but the Fragments of Hallaj, collected and published by the French Orientalist L. Massignon, leave no doubt that the martyr saint could not have meant to deny the transcendence of God. The true interpretation of his experience, therefore, is not the drop slipping into the sea, but the realisation and bold affirmation in an undying phrase of the reality and permanence of the human ego in a profounder personality.

According to Iqbal, this type of spiritual direction was exemplified by the Prophet, who is the exemplar par excellence in Islam: "The Quran says of the Prophet’s vision of the Ultimate Ego [God]: ‘His eye turned not aside, nor did it wander.’ [...] [According to this ideal] the moment we fix our gaze on intensity [or God], we begin to see that the finite ego must be distinct, though not isolated, from the Infinite." Most importantly for Iqbal, given his philosophy of "action," which shall be addressed more fully a little later, "the psychological difference between the prophetic and the mystic types of consciousness" is that "the mystic does not wish to return from the repose of ‘unitary experience’; and even when he does return, as he must, his return does not mean much for mankind at large. The prophet’s return [however] is creative. He returns to insert himself into the sweep of time with a view to controlling the forces of history, and thereby to creating a fresh world of ideals...." The most Perfect Man is the most perfect vicegerent, whose function is as master of the world, of the universe, of all things.

For Iqbal, man’s function is to attain to an ever-increasing individuality and freedom, which can only be achieved through proximity, or "realisation" of that proximity, to God: "The Ego attains to freedom by the removal of all obstructions in its way. It is partly free, partly determined, and reaches fuller freedom by approaching the Individual who is most free – God. In one word, life is an endeavor for freedom." This proximity is in a sense a "proximating" of God, which derives from the famous tradition takhallaqu bi-akhlaq illah, "Create in yourselves the attributes of God," that is, "man should attain more and more nearness to a unique God. Thus man becomes unique by becoming more and more like the most unique individual." Such an individuality is not the case of the "drop slipping into the sea," but it is to become a shining pearl in the bosom of the sea, which is superb in its individual luster, but at the same time could not have come into being without the sea. As Iqbal writes in kulliyaat-e iqbaal Urdu, "If I am an oyster-shell, then in your hand is the brightness/honor of my pearl,/if I am a pottery-shard, then make me a royal pearl!" Thus the individualities of God and man exist in a dynamic and creative tension in Iqbal’s philosophy, a tension that he does not resolve entirely satisfactorily. As part of man’s creating in himself the attributes of God, one of the main qualities that he achieves is that of "creator," which again he gains through proximity to the Ultimate Reality: "Of all the creations of God [man] alone is capable of consciously participating in the creative life of his Maker." However, in order to overcome the tension between the "creator man" and the "Creator God," Iqbal says that God consciously limited His omnipotent will: "It [this limitation] is born out of his own creative freedom whereby he has chosen finite egos to be participators in his life, power and freedom." Thus, the universe is not static and complete, but rather is forever evolving. "It is not a block universe, a finished product, immobile and incapable of change. Deep in its inner being lies, perhaps, the dream of a new birth." It is man’s role to direct the universe to ever-increasing perfection, which he does through the pull of love / desire, without which he becomes as though "dead": "Life is latent in seeking, / Its origin is hidden in desire, / Keep desire alive in thine heart /Lest thy little dust become a tomb. / Negation of desire is death to the living. / Even an absence of heat extinguishes the flame." Through this constant movement, man molds his very destiny: "Do not fetter thyself with the chains of Taqdir [destiny], / for with this canopy of heaven there is a way out. / If thou dost not believe rise and discover that no sooner hast thou released thy feet findest thou a free field." In this way the Iqbalian man is the one who manifests God’s decree. "The Momin (believer) is himself the destiny of God, so that when he changes his own self, his destiny also changes." As Iqbal writes, "Abdudhu [the servant of God] is the fashioner of Destiny…." Iqbal criticises pantheistic Sufism because of its failure to recognise this creative, active and destiny-fashioning role of man. Regarding this state of mind, Iqbal writes, "We find a strange similarity in Hindu and some of the Muslim thinkers who thought over [the] problem of the self. The point of view adopted by Sankara in the interpretation of the Gita was the same that was followed by Ibn ‘Arabi in the interpretation of the Quran." That is, its state of mind is one of inaction, fatalism, and quietism. The Iqbalian man, on the other hand, is constantly striving and has within him the state of creative "tension" through which he constantly perfects himself: "Personality is a state of tension and can continue only if that state is maintained…. Since personality, or the state of tension, is the most valuable achievement of man, he should see that he does not revert to a state of relaxation." In this conception of "higher" Sufism, as he calls it, Iqbal envisions the "human ego [as] rising higher than mere reflection, and mending its transiency by appropriating the eternal." Action is the very basis of life – it is the way of the Prophet and of God Himself.

Thus, through the untiring action of Iqbalian man, society’s wellbeing is ensured and maintained. "The fate of a people does not depend so much on organisation as on the worth of and power of individual men." Without such an effort, society becomes decadent – which is the current state of Muslims, according to Iqbal. Through the inner, creative tension of man, an evolutionary picture of his ascent is put forward by Iqbal, which borrows from Bergson’s élan vital and Nietzsche’s will to power, whereby the fundamental driving force of humanity (and all of existence, in fact) is the achievement of endless perfection. "In his inmost being man, as conceived by the Quran, is a creative activity, an ascending spirit who, in his outward march, rises from one state of being to another: ‘It needs not that I swear by the sunset redness and by the night and its gatherings and by the moon when at her full, that from state to state shall ye be surely carried onward.’" Thus "the joy of the journey is not in the arrival, but in the perpetual tramp…. Ceaseless effort and not repose is what gives zest to life, and so Iqbal prefers humanity in its imperfect state." Illustrated in Iqbal’s own words, "Man marches always onward to receive ever fresh illuminations from an Infinite Reality which ‘every moment appears in a new glory.’" Iqbal saw in the constant striving to realise the perfection of the individual epitomised by Hallaj’s ana al-Haq, as described earlier, the ideal of the nation itself. Annemarie Schimmel notes, "In a group of quatrains in his posthumous work (Armaghan-i Hijaz), the ideal nation is that which realises ana’l-haqq in its striving, i.e. which proves to be creative truth, a living, active reality which witnesses God’s reality by its own national – or supranational – life." This is an idea that seeks to reconcile the opposition between Iqbal’s perfect man being an individual, and his responsibility to society. Indeed, the Iqbalian man is at once separate from society and inextricably bound to it. This conception of man and society is mirrored in Iqbal’s notion of man’s relationship to God, as a simple verse summarises his entire attitude to the problem: "The men of God do not become God,/but they are never separated from God!" In this way, the Iqbalian man, in his never-ending creativity – which is rooted in man’s inextricable relationship to God – continually recreates himself and his society, thereby, inevitably, shedding the shackles of colonialism.

== Contentions ==
While Iqbal did receive primary education in a Quran school, his subsequent formal education was almost entirely modern and Western. In Subject Lessons: The Western Education of Colonial India, Sanjay Seth examines how modern, Western education – with its very different epistemology and attendant subject formations, as compared to indigenous forms of knowledge in (pre) colonial India – contributed towards (re) shaping Muslim subjectivities. To be sure, Seth shows that there wasn't a wholesale displacement of indigenous modes of knowing; however, a significant rupture did occur, resulting in a rethinking of indigenous learning. It is within this intellectual milieu, which included such important figures as Rabindranath Tagore and Mahatma Gandhi, that Iqbal should be located. In other words, Indian intellectuals thought through, against, and in relation to modern, Western ideas and categories of politics, philosophy, culture, and religion. A fascinating illustration of the way in which Iqbal accepted Western constructions of Islam and Muslims is expressed in a handful of letters. Iqbal writes about his feeling of being torn between his "constitutional" inclinations towards the traditional Sufism of his forefathers, and what he understood to be the "true" Islam of the Quran and the Prophet of Islam. In the above-mentioned letters (referred to by Javed Majeed in his study of Muhammad Iqbal), Iqbal writes of his natural disposition towards the fana of Ibn ‘Arabi’s Sufism, which he had so resolutely dismissed in his writings. However, Iqbal was "constrained by the needs of the time to define himself against the notion of fana." While Javed Majeed puts this down to Iqbal’s "willed alienation from the tradition he defines himself against," It is noteworthy that Iqbal’s doctoral dissertation, "The Development of Metaphysics in Persia," in many ways reproduces Orientalist ideas about Sufism as an aberration inserted into the "dry," "legalistic," "desert" religion of Islam. He writes in the introduction of his dissertation-turned-book, "The student of Islamic Mysticism who is anxious to see an all-embracing exposition of the principle of Unity, must look [at] the Andalusian Ibn al-‘Arabi, whose profound teaching stands in strange contrast with the dry-as-dust Islam of his countrymen." In other words, Iqbal accepted Orientalist constructions of Islam and Muslims, thereby positioning himself within a discursive formation as far as his reconstruction of Islamic thought. The argument is therefore, in keeping with Talal Asad’s reflections on the problem with the idea of "agency," as "the structuration of conditions and possibilities." That is, the ways in which one is delimited from the start by practical and epistemological conditions necessitate that an Iqbal, a Tagore, or a Gandhi do things a certain way, and the "consciousness with which one does them" is really of another order. It is in this way that Iqbal’s little-known ambivalence towards his own adopted position vis-à-vis traditional Sufism can be better understood. This also sheds light on Iqbal’s understanding of Sufism, since Sufism was constructed as an accretion to Islam by Orientalists. In this regard, Tomoko Masuzawa writes in The Invention of World Religions: Or, How European Universalism Was Preserved in the Language of Pluralism: Seen through the mystic kernel of Sufism, all the parochial and miserly laws, childish dogmas, and ceremonial encrustations that have constituted orthodox Islam seem to fall away. In effect, through deep contemplation, this kernel would come to seem something other than Islam proper, or Islam in the usual sense. To be sure, Iqbal was not alone among the modernists in casting aspersions on Sufism for bringing about the decline of Muslim civilisation. Syed Ahmad Khan, Muhammad Abduh, and Rashid Rida all singled out Sufism for blame. What made Iqbal different from other Islamic modernists was that he did not – at least not at the outset – seek to dismiss Sufism tout court. Rather, his reconstruction of Islamic thought was in significant ways a reconstruction of Sufism, a reimagining and reinvigoration of Sufism, which he called "higher Sufism," and a reassessment of the role of the self within Sufi metaphysics. In traditional Sufi cosmology, the self/soul (nafs) is graded according to three levels: the soul that commands to evil (nafs al-‘ammara); the self-reproaching soul (nafs al-lawwama); and the soul at peace (nafs al-mutmainna). The soul, according to this understanding, attains the highest level through striving to do good deeds – in obedience to God – which, by the methods of spiritual realisation handed down from master to disciple, ultimately allows one to train the soul so that it becomes in tune with the divine. For Iqbal, this amounted to a denial of the essence of what makes humans human, and also what he argued was the crucial aspect of the Quranic narrative: that, when God offered the "trust" [amanah] to the heavens and the earth and the mountains they refused; but when He offered the trust to man, he accepted (Quran 33:72). This trust, according to Iqbal, was the trust of "egohood," whereas, according to traditional Islamic cosmology, the trust was considered the trust of tawhid, and of upholding the precepts of the religion. It would appear to be clear that Iqbal is making a radical break from the historic Islamic tradition. The idea of "egohood" or "selfhood" is instrumentalised for the sake of (re)producing Muslims as active agents of change in the world. To consider Iqbal and his relation to Rumi, Hafez and Hallaj, he considered Rumi to be his spiritual-guide, while he described Hafiz as his "cup is full of the poison of death." He regarded Hallaj as embodying the meaning of egohood. Although it has been suggested that Rumi’s poetry lends itself more readily to being read in terms of Islamic morals, whereas this is much less the case with Hafiz, the question here is regarding the extent to which Iqbal was reading these poets, including Hallaj, through Orientalism. It is pertinent that his appreciation of Hallaj and his (apparent) affirmation of "the individual ego" was through Massignon’s studies on Hallaj. As for Hafiz and his wine, the following from William Chittick is significant: No doubt when Hafiz speaks of wine, he means wine. The question is, "What is wine?" All Sufi thought goes back to a cosmology and metaphysics. In order to understand the nature of wine, we must refer to the philosophical and metaphysical beliefs of the Sufi poets who employ the image. For example, Sufi thought of the school of Ibn al-‘Arabi […] holds that the things of this world are not just things, rather they are created by God, derived from God, and ultimately Self-Manifestations of God, loci of His Theophany, places in which He reveals the "Hidden Treasure," mirrors in which the Beauty of the Beloved can be contemplated. God, or if one prefers, "Absolute and Nondelimited Being" (wujûd-i mutlaq), is the Origin of all creatures, of all relative and delimited existents. [...] If Sufis speak of their beloved, they may not be referring only to God, but they also are not referring to "so-and-so" as such, but only insomuch as she is a reflection of the true Beloved. Wine likewise may be wine, and music, music. But if so, they are only dim reflections of true Wine and true Music. In other words, "wine" must not be read simply as an intoxicating drink; rather, it is to be seen significantly as symbolising God Himself. The question being raised here is, in the end, perhaps a simple one: To what extent was Iqbal reading Hafiz literally instead of symbolically? Iqbal’s critique against "pantheistic" Sufism, derives from his idea that the spirit of Quran is anti-classical. It is therefore worth considering what he means by this. Did he mean that the spirit of the Qur’an is against pantheism? That it is against metaphysical speculation of the kind that was adopted by Muslim philosophers and mystics (the two designations typically being applicable to the same individuals)? That it is "radically monotheistic," as has been portrayed by Orientalists? Perhaps Iqbal means to suggest all of the above? A second question that also arises is: To what extent was Iqbal (unconsciously) drawing on a Eurocentric understanding of the relationship between ancient Greek thought and Muslims; an understanding that suggests there was a fundamental opposition (or incompatibility) between "Islam" and Greek philosophy, whereby Muslims preserved and carried down ancient Greek thought as though they were mere vessels, without adding or subtracting anything? That is, Muslim thinkers played no role in interpreting and re-presenting Greek thought within their own intellectual milieu, for that would run counter to the Eurocentric thesis of European exceptionalism: Greek thought was inherited in its entirety, unaltered, and intact from its ancient origins, by the true heirs of such knowledge – modern Europe. This thesis is of course to a large extent continued – albeit unconsciously – in the very manner in which "the Western canon" is taught at universities around the world, with very little consideration given to complicating the study of "world history." Where world history is taught, European history is still seen as separate from the rest of the world. It is also important to consider that Orientalists, in the process of attempting to discover the "original" language(s) of Europe, constructed Greek "polytheism" as a fundamentally creative force in history, whose heir was Western Christianity. The monotheisms of Judaism and Islam were seen as opposed to creativity, with Islam being seen as the least creative of the two (Judaism, at least, was productive of Christianity, or so the logic went). Iqbal’s inversion of the traditional Sufi understanding of the self and his emphasis on the centrality of the self for human achievement and being are significantly informed by a modern, Western understanding of the self going back to Descartes. This, therefore, departs significantly from a traditional Islamic understanding of the self. Like Descartes, Iqbal posits "being" in man, and not in Being as such, as it is the case in premodern Islamic metaphysics, thereby diminishing the function of God as the source of all being. Iqbal makes the point that the ritual prayer (salat) in Islam symbolises both negation and affirmation, which of course is also at the root of the Islamic doctrine: La ilaha illa Allah, "No god but God." However, it may be argued that the negation being first (La ilaha, "No god"), it must mean a denial of the self first and foremost, and only then can there be an affirmation (illa Allah, "but God"), which, according to traditional Sufi metaphysics, is done by God Himself. And so the human self is from the very beginning non-existent. Also like Descartes, Iqbal’s point of departure is the self, as he writes: "To exist in pure duration is to be a self, and to be a self is to be able to say ‘I am.’ Only that truly exists that can say ‘I am’.... But our ‘I-amness’ is dependent and arises out of the distinction between the self and the not-self." He goes on to describe the Ultimate Self (God) as existing by Himself without any need of the other selves, while of course these other selves are in need of Him. The "proof" of God that he formulates is reminiscent of Descartes’ "cogito ergo sum" whose radical skepticism allowed him to begin from his own "thinking" self, and then go on to prove God’s existence. In this case, being is posited in one’s self, prior to that of God. In the end the doctrinal formulation – according to Iqbal – would appear to read: "Man says: No god but God." As far as Iqbal’s use of the word "pantheistic" with regard to Ibn ‘Arabi’s school of thought, it is significant to remember that this was for a long time the kind of language used by Orientalists. In his path breaking work, Three Muslim Sages: Avicenna, Suhrawardi, Ibn Arabi, Seyyed Hossein Nasr writes: The basic doctrine of Sufism, especially as interpreted by Muhyi al-Din [Ibn ‘Arabi] …is that of the transcendent unity of Being (wahdat al-wujud) for which he has been accused by many modern scholars as being a pantheist, a panentheist, and an existential monist…. All of these accusations are false…because they mistake the metaphysical doctrines of Ibn ‘Arabi for philosophy and do not take into consideration the fact that the way of gnosis is not separate from grace and sanctity. The pantheistic accusations against the Sufis are doubly false because, first of all, pantheism is a philosophical system, whereas Muhyi al-Din and others like him never claimed to follow or create any "system" whatsoever; and, secondly, because pantheism implies a substantial continuity between God and the Universe whereas the Shaikh [Ibn ‘Arabi] would have been the first to claim God’s absolute transcendence over every category, including that of substance.

Also consider the following lines from Ibn ‘Arabi’s magnum opus, Futuhat al-Makkiyyah: Each individual among the Folk of Allah has a ladder specific to him which no one else climbs. […] All this takes place because the servant and the Lord always remain together in the perfection of the existence of each in himself. The servant always remains servant and the Lord Lord throughout this increase and decrease. The intention behind pointing to these passages is to shed light on the extent to which Iqbal was informed – whether consciously or unconsciously – by Western, Orientalist constructions of Sufism and Islam; and how this subsequently impacted upon Iqbal’s re-formulation of the self, or khudi. As mentioned earlier, Javed Majeed writes that Iqbal saw his project as being one of "redefining Islam in response to colonialism," as a means of achieving the freedom, independence and self-creation that could only be achieved with the removal of colonial powers from Muslim lands. Iqbal had a pan-Islamic vision. But what does it mean to say: "Life is an endeavor for freedom."? What is the freedom that is being sought? It is of course fundamentally a freedom from colonial rule; this is the central concern of Iqbal’s writing. He is not so much concerned with the perfection of the human self as he is with perfecting selves, who, in their constant striving to re-create the world, ultimately free society from the bondage of colonial rule. Iqbal derives this from Nietzsche whose idea of human perfection in the Overman is an endless process of realisation, perfection as a never-ending quest. At the same time – and somewhat paradoxically, given that Iqbal was not a systematic thinker, – Iqbal was critical of Nietzsche, just as he was critical of modern, Western thought and its excessive reliance on reason, and its inability to relate phenomena with the noumena. Thus, although Nietzsche becomes a central character in his magnum opus the Javid Nama, Iqbal sees in Nietzsche the example of a prophetic vision without the crucial benefit of divine revelation. The question, for the sake of problematising an ideal that is taken for granted, is: Is "freedom" (liberty) necessarily a desirable thing? It is of course an Enlightenment ideal –perhaps the central Enlightenment ideal – but why is it a universal given? What does it mean to be free in a premodern society? Sanjay Seth provides some fascinating insights on this as to the differences in the ideal of freedom between ancient Greece and the modern world: The term slave is for us moderns a social category, meaning that we understand "slave" to signify a free man en-slaved, rather than, as for the Greeks, understanding it to denote a form of selfhood. Our idea of human selfhood or subjectivity has, in other words, a certain notion of "freedom" already built into it. Words like freedom make us think of Rousseau and Kant and the French and American revolutions, and of "fuller" conceptions of freedom – not just freedom as non-enslavement but as autonomy, as choosing our ends, and the means towards them. These associations are of course apt, and are part of what I have been invoking in insisting that modern knowledge presumes a form of subjectivity – active rather than passive, and so on. But the "first" sense of freedom – first in the sense of being both logically prior and historically earlier – is freedom in the sense of being merged into the background, lost into nature like animals and slaves, nomos rather than physis. The Greeks did not think that all men possessed this freedom, and thus it was not built into their conception of what it means to be a human self.

The point here is not that "enslavement" to colonial powers is desirable; and one is also not referring to the "ethics" of slavery in Islam. Rather, the point is this: the modern, Western notion of freedom – from which it is well nigh impossible to extricate our thought – has the notions of "autonomy, as choosing our ends, and the means towards them" already built into it. And this notion of freedom and the attendant idea(s) of subjectivity – the idea of the Muslim self that Iqbal is (re)constructing – rethinks the traditional Islamic idea of "slave of God" (‘abd Allah), which is the status of all human beings before God, as "the fashioner of Destiny." What I am also suggesting is that the ideal of self-determination only becomes possible in the presence of the discourse of nationalism, whose parameters are set from without. That is, political thinking in a (post)colonial world is always already delimited from the outside. To elaborate on this line of thought, in Nationalist Thought and the Colonial World: A Derivative Discourse, Partha Chatterjee provides a "critical study of the ideology of nationalism" as a problem of epistemology and political philosophy, arguing how nationalist thought is inseparable from post-Enlightenment, rationalist notions of knowledge. In accepting Orientalism’s category of the Oriental, while granting him a subjectivity that is active and autonomous, rather than passive and non-participating, nationalist thought nevertheless operates "within a framework of knowledge whose representational structure corresponds to the very structure of power [it] seeks to repudiate." That is, while nationalism succeeds in ostensibly liberating the nation from colonialism, it does so through the knowledge systems of a post-Enlightenment West, which continue to dominate and operate unconsciously. Now, while Iqbal described nationalism as being antithetical to Islam, he also famously expressed the need for Muslims in pre-partition India to have a separate homeland. It is for this reason, due to the epistemological structures within which he was situated, that Iqbal had a contradictory perspective. On one hand, he thought territorial nationalism was contrary to Islam, on the other, he saw Islam as a uniform "culture" which all Muslims had to assimilate in order for them to achieve their long lost political vitality. That being said, Iqbal did not believe in "freedom at any price." He quotes the Muslim scholar of Spain, Tartushi, saying, "Forty years of tyranny are better than one hour of anarchy."

== See also ==
- Index of Muhammad Iqbal–related articles
