= What Should Then Be Done O People of the East =

Book by Mohammed Iqbal

(Persian: پس چہ باید کرد اے اقوامِ شرق, romanized: Pas Cheh Bayad Kard ay Aqwam-i-sharq, lit. 'What Should Then Be Done O People of the East') was a Persian-language philosophical poetry book by Muhammad Iqbal, a poet-philosopher of the Indian subcontinent. It was published in 1936. A translation, commentary and literary appreciation in Urdu by Elahi Bakhsh Akhtar Awan was published by University Book Agency, Khyber Bazar, Peshawar, Pakistan in 1960.

The book includes the mathnavi Musafir. Iqbal's Rumi, the master, utters this glad tiding "East awakes from its slumbers" (Khwab-i ghaflat). Inspiring detailed commentary on voluntary poverty and free man, followed by an exposition of the mysteries of Islamic laws and Sufic perceptions is given. He laments the dissention among the South Asians as well as Muslim nations. The book is an account of a journey to Afghanistan. In the Masnavi, the people of the Suba Sarhad region (Afghans) are counseled to learn the "secret of Islam" and to "build up the self" within themselves because they are a great righteous people. The title has also been translated as What Then Is to Be Done, O Nations of the East.

== Topics ==
Preface

- Introduction
- Address to the World-illuminating Sun
- The Wisdom of Moses
- The Wisdom of the Pharaohs
- There is No Deity Except God
- Faqr
- The Free Man
- The Essence of the Shari'ah
- Lament on the Differences Among Indians
- Present-day Politics
- A Few Words to the Arab People
- What Should Then Be Done, O People of the East?
- To the Prophet
- Dedication

The Traveller

- Prelude
- Address to People of the Frontier
- The Traveller enters Kabul and visits the Mausoleum of the late Martyr King
- At the Tomb of the heaven Resting Babur
- Visiting Ghazni and offering Reverence to Hakim Sanai
- Sanai's Spirit Speaks from Heaven
- At the Tomb of Sultan Mahmud
- Supplication of Frenzied One
- Seeing Prophet's Garb at Qandhar.
- The Chant
- At the Mausoleum of Hadrat Ahmad Shah Baba, Founder of the Afghan Nation
- Talk with the King of Islam Zahir Shah.

== See also ==
- Index of Muhammad Iqbal–related articles
- 1936 in poetry
- Javid Nama
- Payam-i-Mashriq
- Zabur-i-Ajam
- Bang-e-Dara
- Bal-e-Jibril
- Asrar-i-Khudi
- Rumuz-e-Bekhudi
- Zarb-i-Kalim
- Armaghan-i-Hijaz
