= Persian Psalms =

1927 poetry book by Muhammad Iqbal

Zabur-i-Ajam (زبور عجم, Persian Psalms) is a philosophical poetry book, written in Persian, by Allama Iqbal, the great poet-philosopher of the Indian subcontinent. It was published in 1927.

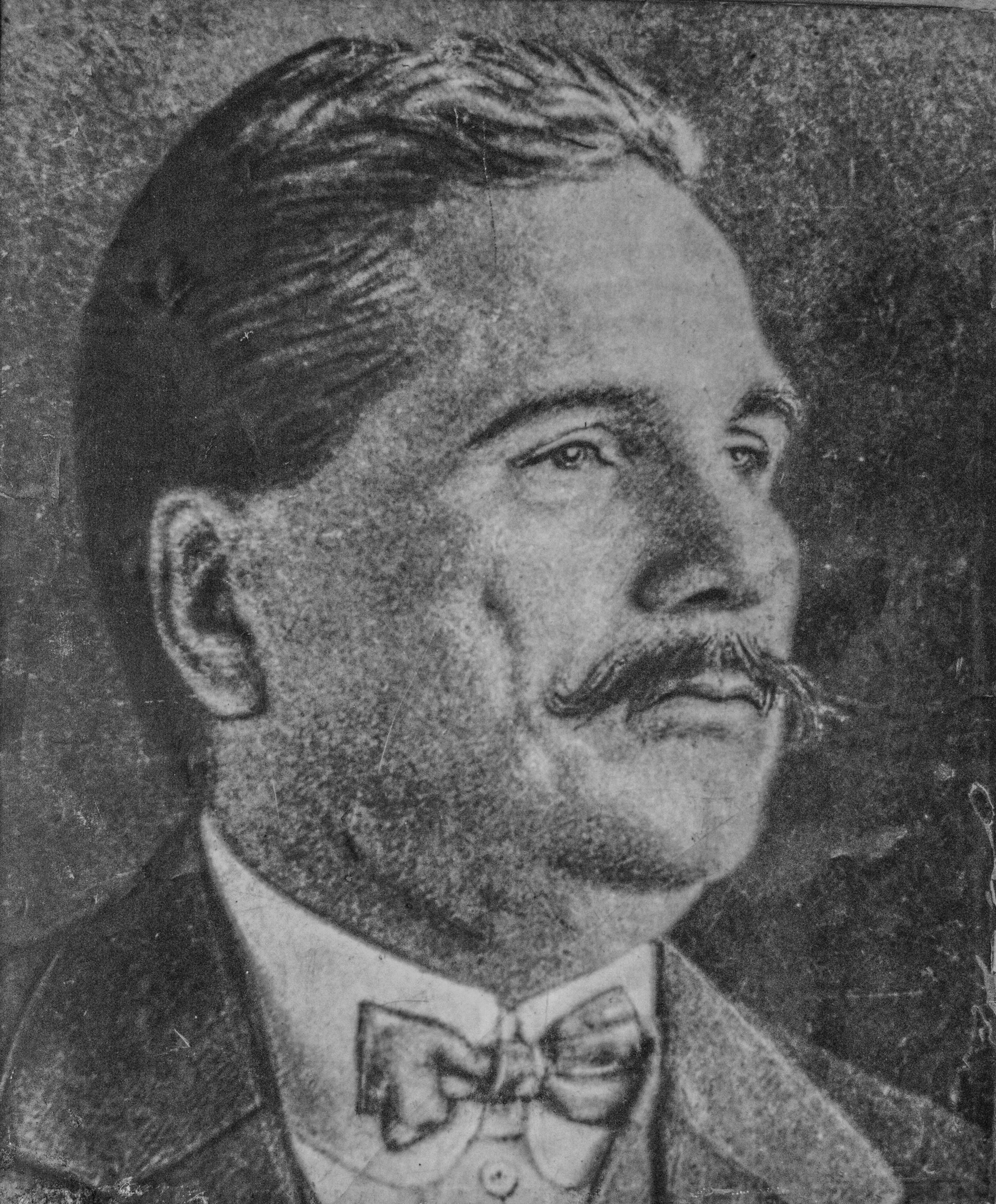
Allama Dr Muhammad Iqbal

== Introduction ==
Zabur-i Ajam includes the mathnavi Gulshan-i Raz-i Jadid and Bandagi Nama. The book includes four sections. The first two are sequences of ghazals in the classical form and the other two are single long poems. Iqbal forcefully expresses his inner convictions and urges the reader to advance himself to achieve progress and prosperity by discovering and strengthening the self.

The first of the two longer poems is the Gulshan-i Raz-i Jadid (گلشن راز جدید, "New Garden of Mysteries"). It alludes to the Gulshan-i Raz, the treatise on Sufism written in Persian verse by Sa'd ad-Din Mahmud Shabistari. Here Iqbal poses and answers nine questions on philosophical problems such as the nature of discursive thought, of the self, and of the relation between the eternal and the temporal.

The subject of the second poem, the Bandagi Nama (بندگی‌نامه, "Book of Servitude") is the loss of freedom, particularly spiritual freedom, of an individual or society, and its consequent evils. It is divided into several sections and touches on the music and other arts of enslaved people, their religious tenets and the art of reconstructing free men.

In Zabur-i Ajam, Iqbal's Persian ghazal is at its best as his Urdu ghazal is in Bal-i Jibril. Here, as in other books, Iqbal insists on remembering the past, doing well in the present and preparing for the future. His lesson is that one should be dynamic, full of zest for action and full of love and life. Implicitly, he proves that there is no form of poetry which can equal the ghazal in vigour and liveliness.

== See also ==
- Index of Muhammad Iqbal–related articles
- Payam-i-Mashriq
- Javid Nama
- Pas Chih Bayad Kard ay Aqwam-i-Sharq
- Bang-e-Dara
- Bal-e-Jibril
- Asrar-i-Khudi
- Rumuz-e-Bekhudi
- Zarb-i-Kalim
- Armaghan-i-Hijaz
- Zabur
- Ajam
