= The Rod of Moses =

Book by Mohammed Iqbal

Zarb-i-Kalim (or The Rod of Moses; Urdu: ضربِ کلیم) is an Urdu-language philosophical poetry book by Allama Iqbal, a poet-philosopher from Pakistan. It was published in 1936, two years before his death.

== Introduction ==
This is the third collection of Allama Sir Muhammad Iqbal's poetry, which is described as his political manifesto. It was published with the subtitle "A Declaration of War Against the Present Times." Muhammad Iqbal, who is known as the "Poet of the East," argues that modern problems are due to the godlessness, materialism and injustice of modern civilisation, which feeds on the subjugation and exploitation of weak nations, especially the Indian Muslims.

== Editions ==
Its first edition was published in 1935, i.e. just three years before the death of Allama Muhammad Iqbal. After that, various editions were published in Pakistan and India, but the most authentic edition was by the Iqbal Academy Pakistan, which was published in 2002 in Lahore.

== See also ==
- Index of Muhammad Iqbal–related articles
- Javid Nama
- Payam-i-Mashriq
- Zabur-i-Ajam
- Pas Chih Bayad Kard ay Aqwam-i-Sharq
- Bang-e-Dara
- Bal-e-Jibril
- Asrar-i-Khudi
- Armaghan-i-Hijaz
- Rumuz-e-Bekhudi
