= The Secrets of Selflessness =

Book by Muhammah Iqbal

Rumuz-e-Bekhudi (Persian: رموز بیخودی; or The Secrets of Selflessness; published in Persian, 1917) was the second philosophical poetry book of Allama Iqbal, a poet-philosopher of the Indian subcontinent. This is a sequel to his first book Asrar-e-Khudi اسرارِ خودی (The Secrets of the Self).

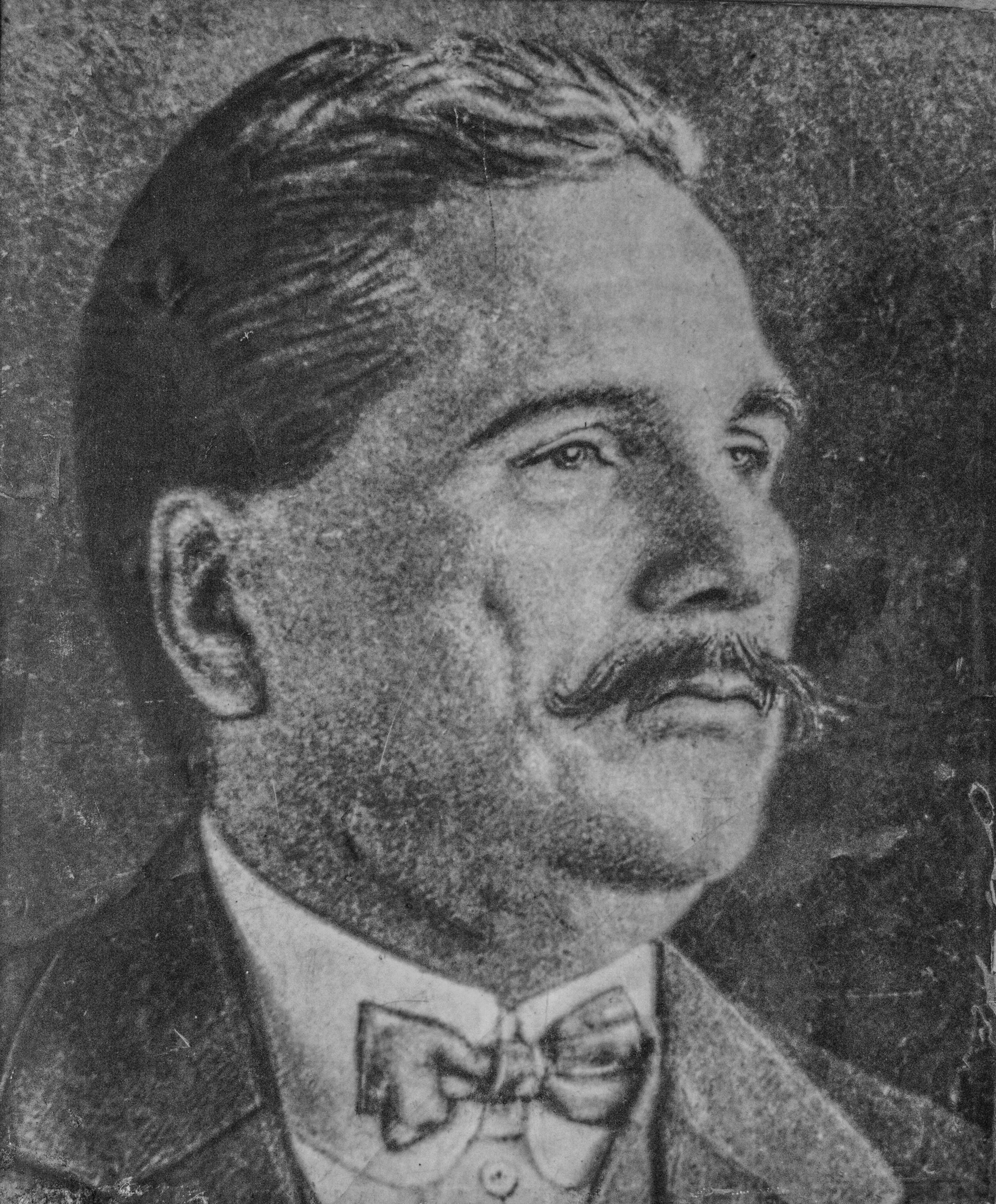
Allama Dr Muhammad Iqbal

== Introduction ==
Also in Persian and published in 1918, this group of poems has as its main themes the ideal community, Islamic ethical and social principles, and the relationship between the individual and society. Although he is true throughout to Islam, Iqbal recognises also the positive analogous aspects of other religions. The Rumuz-e-Bekhudi complements the emphasis on the self in the Asrar-e-Khudi and the two collections are often put in the same volume under the title Asrar-o-Rumuz. A.J. Arberry's famous English translation of the Rumuz first appeared in 1953. Rumuz-i-Bekhudi is addressed to the world's Muslims. Iqbal sees the individual and his community as reflections of each other. The individual needs to be strengthened before he can be integrated into the community, whose development in turn depends on the preservation of the communal ego. It is through contact with others that an ego learns to accept the limitations of its own freedom and the meaning of love. Muslim communities must ensure order in life and must therefore preserve their communal tradition. It is in this context that Iqbal sees the vital role of women, who as mothers are directly responsible for inculcating values in their children.

== Topics ==
- Preface
- Dedication to the Muslim Community
- PRELUDE: Of the Bond between Individual and Community
- That the Community is made up of the Mingling of Individuals, and owes the Perfecting of its Education to Prophethood
- The Pillars of Islam - First Pillar: the Unity of God
- That Despair, Grief and Fear are the Mother of Abominations, destroying Life; and that Belief in the Unity of God puts an end to those Foul Diseases.
- Conversation of the Arrow and the Sword
- Emperor Alamgir and the Tiger
- Second Pillar : Apostleship
- That the Purpose of Muhammad’s Mission was to found Freedom, Equality and Brotherhood among all mankind.
- The story of Bu Ubaid and Jaban, in Illustration of Muslim Brotherhood
- The Story of Sultan Murad and the Architect, in Illustration of Muslim Equality
- Concerning Muslim Freedom and the Secret of the Tragedy of Kerbela
- That since the Muhammadan Community is Founded upon Belief in One God and Apostleship, therefore it is not Bounded by Space
- That the Country is not the Foundation of the Community
- The season of the rose endures beyond
- That the Organization of the Community is only Possible through Law, and that the Law of the Muhammadan Community is the Koran
- That in Times of Decadence Strict Conformity is Better than Free Speculation
- That the Maturity of Communal Life Derives from Following the Divine Law
- That a Good Communal Character Derives from Discipline According to the Manners of the Prophet
- That the Life of the Community Requires a Visible Focus, and that the Focus of the Islamic Community is Mecca’s Sacred House
- That True Solidarity Consists in Adopting a Fixed Communal Objective, and that the Objective of the Muhammadan Community is the Preservation and Propagation of Unitarianism
- That the Expansion of Communal Life Depends upon Controlling the Forces of World Order
- That the Perfection of communal Life is Attained when the Community, like the Individual, Discovers the Sensation of Self; and that the Propagation and Perfecting of this Sensation can be Realized through Guarding the Communal Traditions
- That the Continuance of the Species Derives from Motherhood; and that the Preservation and Honouring of Motherhood is the Foundation of Islam
- That the Lady Fatima is the Perfect Pattern of Muslim Womanhood
- Address to the Veiled Ladies of Islam.
- Summary of the purport of the poem
- In Exegesis of the Sura of Pure Faith: “Say: He is God, One”
- “God, the Self-Subsistent”
- “He Begat Not, Neither Was He Begotten”
- “And There is Not Any Equal Unto Him”
- The Author's Memorial to him who is a mercy to all living beings

== See also ==
- Index of Muhammad Iqbal–related articles
- Armaghan-i-Hijaz
- Asrar-i-Khudi
- Bal-e-Jibril
- Bang-e-Dara
- Javid Nama
- Pas Chih Bayad Kard ay Aqwam-i-Sharq
- Payam-i-Mashriq
- Zabur-i-Ajam
- Zarb-i-Kalim
