= The Secrets of the Self =

Book written by Allama Muhammad Iqbal

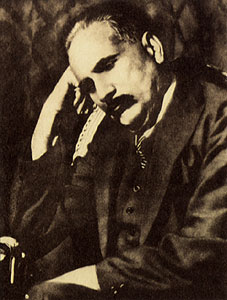
Iqbal, the author

Asrar-i-Khudi (Persian: اسرار خودی, The Secrets of the Self; published in Persian, 1915) was the first philosophical poetry book of Allama Iqbal. This book deals mainly with the individual, while his second book Rumuz-i-Bekhudi رموزِ بیخودی discusses the interaction between the individual and society.

== Introduction ==
Published in 1915, Asrar-i-Khudi (Secrets of the Self) was the first poetry book of Iqbal. Considered by many to be Iqbal's best book of poetry, it is concerned with the philosophy of religion. In a letter to the poet Ghulam Qadir Girami (d.1345/1927), Iqbal wrote, "The ideas behind the verses had never been expressed before either in the East or in the West." R.A. Nicholson, who translated the Asrar as The Secrets of the Self, says it caught the attention of young Muslims as soon as it was printed. Iqbal wrote this in Persian because he felt the language was well-suited for the expression of these ideas. Asrar-i-Khudi provoked strong controversy on publication; Schimmel describes it as having acted as a shock to many of Iqbal's own friends and admirers, who were unsettled by its rejection of the traditional Sufi doctrine of self-annihilation.

== Overview ==
In the year 1915, Iqbal published his first collection of poetry, the Asrar-e-Khudi (Secrets of the Self) in Persian. The poems emphasise the spirit and self from a religious, spiritual perspective. Many critics have called this Iqbal's finest poetic work.

In Asrar-e-Khudi, Iqbal has explained his philosophy of "Khudi," or "Self." Iqbal' s use of the term "Khudi" is synonymous with the word of "Rooh" as mentioned in the Quran. "Rooh" is that divine spark which is present in every human being and was present in Adam for which God ordered all of the angels to prostrate before Adam.

According to Iqbal's philosophy, realising the divine spark which he calls "Khudi" requires a process of transformation. This can be compared to the relationship between fragrance and seed. Every seed has the potential for fragrance within it, but to reach it the seed must go through several stages: breaking out of its shell, breaking through the ground while developing roots, developing leaves and flowers, and finally producing the fragrance that was hidden within it.

In the same way, to reach one's khudi or rooh one needs to go through multiple stages which Iqbal himself went through, spiritual path which he encourages others to travel. He notes that not all seeds reach the level of fragrance. Many die along the way, incomplete. In the same way, only few people could climb this Mount Everest of spirituality, most get consumed along the way by materialism. The same concept had been used by the medieval poet and philosopher Farid ud-Din Attar of Nishapur in his "Mantaq-ul-Tair" ("The Conference of the Birds").

Iqbal proves by various means that the whole universe obeys the will of the "Self." He condemns self-destruction. For him, the aim of life is self-realisation and self-knowledge. He charts the stages through which the "Self" has to pass before finally arriving at its point of perfection, enabling the knower of the "Self" to become the vicegerent of God.

== Topics ==
- Introduction
- Prologue
- Showing that the system of the universe originates in the Self, and that the continuation of the life of all individuals depends on strengthening the Self
- Showing that the life of the Self comes from forming desires and bringing them to birth
- Showing that the Self is strengthened by Love
- Showing that the Self is weakened by asking
- Showing that when the Self is strengthened by Love its gains dominion over the outward and inward forces of the universe
- A tale of which the moral is that negation of the Self is a doctrine invented by the subject races of mankind in order that by this means they may sap and weaken the character of their roles
- To the effect that Plato, whose thought has deeply influenced the mysticism and literature of Islam, followed the sheep's doctrine, and that we must be on our guard against his theories
- Concerning the true nature of poetry and the reform of Islamic literature
- Showing that the education of the self has three stages: Obedience, Self-control, and Divine Vicegerence
- Setting forth the inner meanings of the names of Ali
- Story of a young man of Merv who came to the saint Ali Hujwiri – God have mercy on him and complained that he was oppressed by the enemies
- Story of the bird that was faint with thirst
- Story of the diamond and the coal
- Story of the Sheikh and the Brahmin, followed by a conversation between Ganges and Himalayas to the effect that the continuation of social life depends on firm attachment to the characteristic traditions of the community
- Showing that the purpose of the Muslims 's like is to exalt the Word of God, and that the Jihad (to strive or to struggle), if it be prompted by land-hunger, is unlawful in the religion of Islam
- Precepts written for the Muslims of India by Mir Najat Nakshbandi. Who is generally known as Baba Sahr'ai
- Time is a sword
- Invocation

== Editions ==
- Nicholson, Reynold A. (tr. from original in Persian ) (1920). Secrets of the Self (Asrar-i khudi) – A philosophical poem by Sheikh Muhammad Iqbal. Macmillan & Co., London.

== See also ==
- Index of Muhammad Iqbal–related articles
- Javid Nama
- Payam-i-Mashriq
- Zabur-i-Ajam
- Pas Chih Bayad Kard ay Aqwam-i-Sharq
- Bang-e-Dara
- Bal-e-Jibril
- Rumuz-e-Bekhudi
- Zarb-i-Kalim
- Armaghan-i-Hijaz
