= Zinda Rood =

4 volume biographical work about Muhammad Iqbal

Zinda Rood

Zinda Rood is a 4 volume biographical work by Justice Javed Iqbal about his father Muhammad Iqbal, a Muslim poet-philosopher. Zinda Rood is translated as "living stream of life", a pseudonym Muhammad Iqbal used for himself in his Persian Masnavi Javid Nama.

== Translation ==
The complete biography has been unified and translated in Kannada language as "Baduku Baraha" (ಬದುಕು ಬರಹ) by Ismath Unnisa, a renowned Kannada professor and writer.

== See also ==
- Index of Muhammad Iqbal–related articles
