= The Mosque of Cordoba =

Urdu poem by Muhammad Iqbal

The Mosque of Cordoba (Urdu: مسجد قرطبہ, romanized: Masjid-e Qurtaba) is an eight-stanza Urdu poem by Muhammad Iqbal, written circa 1932 and published in his 1935–36 collection Bāl-e Jibrīl ('The Wing of Gabriel'). It has been described as "one of his most famous pieces" and a "masterpiece". It has also been compared to Ahmad Shawqi's Arabic poem Siniyyah for its locating in Islamic Spain "the embodiment of the ideal, non-territorial Islamic nation" that is, in both poems' world-views, "the source of world history."

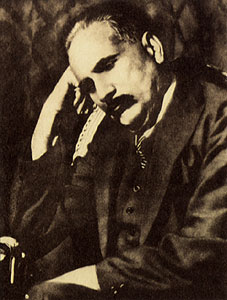
Muhammad Iqbal, then president of the Muslim League in 1930 and address deliverer

== Context of Composition ==
Iqbal travelled to England in 1931 to participate in the second and third Round Table Conferences in London. He returned to India via Spain (as well as France and Italy), and it was at this time that he visited the eponymous mosque, though by that time it had long since been converted to a cathedral. Nevertheless, it was at what has been described as one of the "high points of his emotional life" that he composed the majority of the poem, as its subtitle clearly indicates:

"Hispānīya kī sarzamīn bālkhusūs qurtaba men likhī ga'ī", or, "Written in the land of Spain, particularly in Córdoba".

The visit must indeed have inspired him, as the resultant poem is one of the very few occasions in which Iqbal praises art or architecture. Annemarie Schimmel has observed,

"He was most critical to the existence of fine arts in Islamic culture, and has admired most those buildings which seem to express the vigorous character of the young and powerful Islam, like the mosque of Cordova, and the Qutub Minar of Delhi. But on the whole the beautiful form as such did not appeal that much to him."

== Structure ==
The poem is written in the rajaz metre, with the following pattern of long (–) and short ( ˘ ) syllables divided into four feet:

– ˘ ˘ – / – ˘ – / – ˘ ˘ – / – ˘ –

with an optional caesura or additional short syllable at the end of each line.

The eight stanzas are thematically quite distinct, but linked together in a natural progression of ideas.

Stanza 1: A description of the nature of time, as an unending and cyclical chain of days and nights ("Silsila-e roz-o shab") which is nevertheless only an apparent reality; everything that man creates is therefore ephemeral, and the end result is annihilation ("Kār-e jahān be ṣabāt!").
Stanza 2: Here Iqbal focusses on the one quality that transcends time and is, as such, indestructible: true, spiritual love ("'ishq").
Stanza 3: It was this love, then, that created the mosque of Cordoba; it is the ability to feel the "burning and melting" of worship that places man in a more privileged state even than the forms of light ("paikar-e nūrī").
Stanza 4: The glory and beauty ("jalāl-o jamāl") of the mosque causes Iqbal to think on the nature and qualities of the true believer, whose refuge in times of trouble is in the declaration of faith ("Sāyah-e shamshīr men us kī panā lā 'ilāha").
Stanza 5: Here Iqbal outlines the characteristics of a true Muslim.
Stanza 6: The centrality of the mosque of Cordoba to Islamic Spain is compared to the centrality of the Kaaba to Islam generally; while the positive impact of Islam on Spain and Europe is extolled.
Stanza 7: Iqbal bemoans the waning of Islam in Europe, and outlines the great upheavals that swept Europe from the 16th to 18th centuries. He observes that a similar turmoil currently exists in the Muslim world.
Stanza 8: This is a call for revolution and reform, as well as a summary of the poem in general.

== See also ==
- Index of Muhammad Iqbal–related articles
