= The Call of the Marching Bell =

1924 poetry collection by Muhammad Iqbal

The Call of the Marching Bell (Urdu: بان٘گِ دَرا, Bang-e-Dara; published in 1924) was the first Urdu philosophical poetry book by the South Asian Islamic philosopher and poet Muhammad Iqbal.

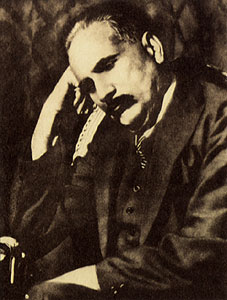
Muhammad Iqbal, then president of the Muslim League in 1930 and address deliverer

== Content ==
The poems in The Call of the Marching Bell were written by Iqbal over a period of twenty years; the collection is divided into three parts:

The book is named "The Call of the Marching Bell" [Bang-e-Dara]. It is a bell that people used to ring in old times to awaken the travelers that now it is time to move on to their next destination, this book has the same purpose to awaken the Muslims of Hindustan and remind them that this is time for them to move on. This poem helped the Muslims to wake up and know who they really are and what is their purpose.

1. Poems written before 1905, the year Iqbal left British India for England. These include nursery, pastoral, and patriotic verses. "Tarana-e-Hindi" ("The Song of India") has become an anthem and is sung or played in India at national events. "Hindustani Bachon Ka Qaumi Geet" (National Anthem for Indian Children) is another well-known song.
2. Poems written between 1905 and 1908, the period he spent as a student in Europe. He praises the rationality and pragmatism of the West but complains about its overt materialism, loss of spirituality, and narrow patriotism, which promises to suffer. This situation strengthened his belief in the universal values of Islam, and he resolved to use his poetry to stir Muslims to a renaissance.
3. Poems written between 1908 and 1923, in which Iqbal reminds Muslims of their past glory and calls for a sense of brotherhood and unity that transcends territorial boundaries. He urges the ummah to live a life of servitude to God, of sacrifice, and of action so that they may regain the high civilisation that was once theirs. "Yam Awr Shair" ("The Poet and the Cradle"), "Shikwa" ("The Complaint to God"), "Jawab-i-Shikwa" ("The Response to the Complaint"), "Khizr-i-Rah" ("Guidance"), and "Tulu'i Islam" ("Light of Islam") are considered among the greatest Islamic poems. Love and the self are important themes throughout this section.

== See also ==
- Index of Muhammad Iqbal–related articles
- Urdu poetry
- Javid Nama
- Payam-i-Mashriq
- Zabur-i-Ajam
- Pas Chih Bayad Kard ay Aqwam-i-Sharq
- Bal-e-Jibril
- Asrar-i-Khudi
- Rumuz-e-Bekhudi
- Zarb-i-Kalim
- Armaghan-i-Hijaz
