= Javid Nama =

1932 book of poetry by Muhammad Iqbal

The Javid Nama (Persian: جاویدنامه, romanized: Jāwēdnāma), or Book of Eternity, is a Persian book of poetry written by Muhammad Iqbal and published in 1932. It is considered one of the masterpieces of Iqbal. It is inspired by Dante Alighieri's Divine Comedy, and just as Dante's guide was Virgil, Iqbal is guided by Maulana Rumi. Both of them visit different spheres in the heavens coming across different people. Iqbal uses the pseudonym Zinda Rood for himself in this book.

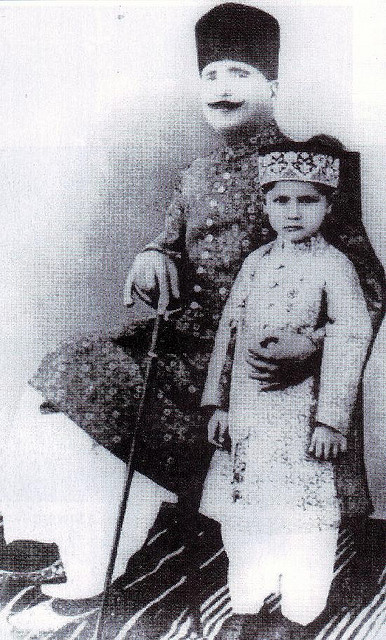
Allama Iqbal with his son Javed Iqbal in 1930

It was translated into English by Arthur John Arberry, into German as Dschavidnma: Das Buch der Ewigkeit by Annemarie Schimmel, and in Italian as Il Poema Celeste by Alessandro Bausani. Schimmel also prepared a Turkish translation, Cevidname, based on her German edition.

== Introduction ==
"Man, in this world of seven hues, lute-like is ever afire with lamentation; yearning for a kindred spirit burns him inwardly", Iqbal opens.

As he prays, he begins reciting Rumi's Persian verses in which Rumi is pleading with his Shaykh to reveals a true Human Being to him. As Iqbal finishes these verses, Rumi appears to him. Iqbal now depicts himself as Zinda Rood (a stream, full of life) guided by Rumi the master, through various heavens and spheres and has the honour of approaching Divinity and coming in contact with divine illuminations and historical figures including Jamal al-Din al-Afghani, Said Halim Pasha, Mansur al-Hallaj, Mirza Ghalib and Friedrich Nietzsche.

Several problems of life are discussed and philosophical answers are provided to them. It is an exceedingly enlivening study. Iqbal heavily criticized figures in Indian history such as Mir Jafar from Bengal and Mir Sadiq from the Deccan, who were instrumental in the defeat and death of Nawab Siraj-ud-Daulah of Bengal and Tipu Sultan of Mysuru respectively by betraying them to the East India Company, leading to India to fall under colonial rule. At the end, by addressing his son Javid Iqbal, he speaks to the young people at large and provides guidance to the "new generation."

== Contents ==
- Prayer
- Prelude in Heaven
  - On the first day of creation Heaven rebukes Earth
  - Song of the Angels
- Prelude on Earth
  - The Spirit of Rumi appears and explains the mystery of the Ascension
  - Zarvan: the Spirit of Time and Space, conducts the Traveler on his journey to the Supernatural World
  - Chant of the Stars
- The Sphere of the Moon
  - An Indian ascetic, known to the people of India as Jahan-Dost
  - Nine sayings of the Indian sage
  - Epiphany of Sarosh
  - The Song of Sarosh
  - Departure for the Valley of Yarghamid, called by the Angels the Valley of Tawasin
  - Tasin Of Gautama
  - Tasin Of Zoroaster
  - Tasin Of Christ
  - Tasin Of Muhammad
- The Sphere of Mercury
  - Visitation to the Spirits of Jamal al-Din al-Afghani and Sa'id Halim Pasha
  - Religion and Country
  - Communism and Capitalism
  - East and West
  - The Foundations Of The Koranic World
  - Man, God’s Vicegerent
  - Divine Government
  - The Earth Is The Lord's
  - Wisdom Is A Great Good
  - Afghani's Message to the Russian People
  - The Song Of Zinda-Rud
- The Sphere of Venus
  - The assembly of the gods of the ancient peoples
  - Song of Baal
  - We plunge into the Sea of Venus and behold the spirits of Pharaoh and Kitchener
  - The Sudanese Dervish appear
- The Sphere of Mars
  - The Martians
  - The Martian astronomer comes out of the observatory
  - Tour of the city of Marghadin
  - The Martian damsel who claimed to be a prophetess
  - Admonition of the Martian Prophetess
- The Sphere of Jupiter
  - The noble spirits of Hallaj, Ghalib, and Qurrat al-Ain Tahira who disdained to dwell in Paradise, preferring to wander for ever
  - The Song of Hallaj
  - The Song of Ghalib
  - The Song of Tahira
  - Zinda-Rud propounds his problems to the great spirits
  - Iblis, Leader of the People of Separation, appears
  - Satan’s Lament
- The Sphere of Saturn
  - The vile spirits which have betrayed the nation and have been rejected by Hell
  - The Sea of Blood
  - The Spirit of India appears
  - The Spirit of India laments
  - The lament of one of the skiff-riders of the Sea of Blood
- Beyond the Spheres
  - The station of the German philosopher Nietzsche
  - Departure for the Garden of Paradise
  - The Palace of Sharaf al-Nisa
  - Visitation to His Highness Mir Sayyid Ali Hamadani and Mulla Tahir Ghani of Kashmir
  - In the presence of Shah-i Hamadan
  - Meeting with the Indian poet Bartari-Hari
  - Departure to the palace of the kings of the East, Nadir, Abdali, the Martyr - King
  - The spirit of Nasir-i Khusrau Alavi appears, sings an impassioned ghazal, and vanishes
  - Message of the Martyr-King to the River Cauvery
  - Zinda-Rud departs from Paradise: the Houris’ request
  - Ghazal of Zinda-Rud
  - The Divine Presence

== See also ==
- Index of Muhammad Iqbal–related articles
- Payam-i-Mashriq
- Zabur-i-Ajam
- Pas Chih Bayad Kard ay Aqwam-i-Sharq
- Bang-e-Dara
- Bal-e-Jibril
- Asrar-i-Khudi
- Rumuz-e-Bekhudi
- Zarb-i-Kalim
- Armaghan-i-Hijaz
