= Gabriel's Wing =

1935 philosophical poetry book by Muhammad Iqbal

Baal-e-Jibril
- Author: Muhammad Iqbal
- Language: Urdu
- Genre: Philosophical poetry
- Published: 1935
- Publication place: British India
- ISBN: 978-1719472074

Baal-e-Jibril (Urdu: بال جبریل; or Gabriel's Wing; published in Urdu, 1935) is a philosophical poetry book by Allama Muhammad Iqbal.

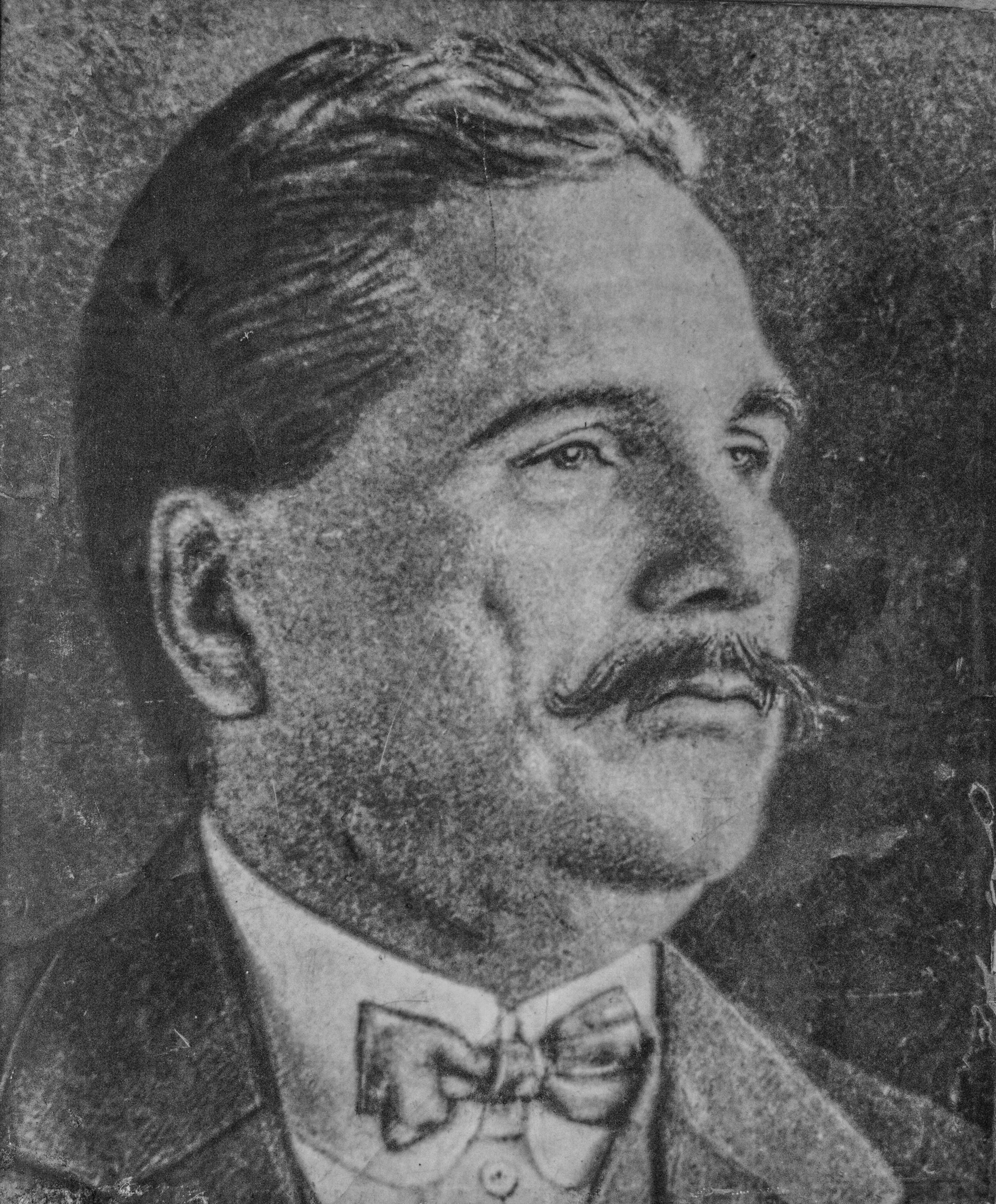
Allama Dr Muhammad Iqbal

== Introduction ==
Iqbal's first book of poetry in Urdu, Bang-i-Dara (1924), was followed by Baal-e-Jibril in 1935 and Zarb-i-Kalim in 1936. Baal-e-Jibril is regarded as the peak of Iqbal's Urdu poetry. It consists of ghazals, poems, quatrains, epigrams and advises the nurturing of the vision and intellect necessary to foster sincerity and firm belief in the heart of the ummah and turn its members into true believers.

Some of the verses had been written when Iqbal visited Britain, Italy, Palestine, France, Spain and Afghanistan, including one of Iqbal's best known poems The Mosque of Cordoba.

The work contains 15 ghazals addressed to God and 61 ghazals and 22 quatrains dealing with ego, faith, love, knowledge, the intellect and freedom. Iqbal recalls the past glory of Muslims as he deals with contemporary political problems.

== Contents ==
Introduction

Odes Part-I

- A blaze is raging near His Throne
- If the stars are astray
- Bright are Thy tresses, brighten them even more
- A free spirit I have, and seek no praise for it
- What avails love when life is so ephemeral?
- If my scattered dust turns into a heart again
- The world is tospy—turvy; the stars are wildly spinning
- O Cup—bearer! Give me again that wine of love for Thee
- My Lord has effaced the gulf between His world and mine
- Consuming fire for thee
- Dost Thou remember not my heart’s first rapture
- When flowers deck themselves into ruby bloom
- My power of making music
- I had believed my arena was under the starry heavens
- Reason is either luminous, or it seeks proofs
- O Lord! This world of Thine has a winsome face

Odes Part-II

- Selfhood can demolish the magic of this world
- Who sings this poignant song, blithe in spirit
- The secret divine my ecstasy has taught
- O myriad–coloured earth
- Thou art yet region—bound
- The dervish, in his freedom
- The flowers are once more in radiant bloom
- Muslims are born with a gift to charm, to persuade
- It is love that infuses warmth into the music of life
- With a heart unknown to a flame
- The tongue and the heart
- These Western nymphs
- An illumined heart is supernal
- Selfhood is daring in power, but has no pride
- The leader is unworthy
- Winter winds pierced me like a sharp sword
- This ancient world
- The way to renounce is
- Reason is not far
- Selfhood is an ocean boundless, fathomless
- The morning breeze has whispered to me a secret
- Thy vision and thy hands are chained, earth—bound
- The only treasure reason has, is knowledge
- Alexander’s burnished throne
- Thou art not for the earth
- In bondage of space
- Reason has bestowed on me the eye of the wise
- My plaint at last evoked
- The sun, the moon, the stars
- Every object has the urge
- Is it a miracle,
- Why should I ask wise men about my origin?
- When the love of God teaches self—awareness
- Explore the mysteries of’ fate, as I have done
- This onrush of yearning
- Let thy reason be close to nature
- Alas! These men of church and mosque are known
- Reason has devised again the magic of ancient days
- Beyond the stars there are
- The West seeks to make life a perpetual feast
- Selfhood is Gabriel’s power
- Does freshness of thought
- As captured in a mirror
- Sufis lack the fire, the passion that consumes
- Intuition in the West was clever in its power
- Cut the Gordian knot
- Neither the power of kings
- New worlds will he conquered
- Arise! The bugle calls! It is time to leave!
- The crescent has surpassed
- Do not get engrossed In the dawning day and night
- The training grounds of valour
- Salman the mellifluous
- Kings and crowns and armies
- Stanza: The style may not he vivid and lively, still

Quatrains

- All potent wine is emptied of Thy cask
- Make our hearts the seats of mercy and love
- Estranging are the ways in the holy precinct
- O wave! Plunge headlong into the dark seas
- Am I bound by space, or beyond space?
- I was in the solitude of Selfhood lost
- Confused is the nature of my love for Thee
- Faith survives in fire, like Abraham
- Observe the strains of' lily song:
- My nature is like the fresh breeze of morn
- A restless heart throb, in every atom
- Thy vision is not lofty, ethereal
- Neither the Muslim nor his power survives
- Selfhood in the world of men is prophethood
- Distracted are thy eyes in myriad ways
- The beauty of mystic love is shaped in song
- Where is the moving spirit of my life?
- I am not a pursuer, nor a traveller
- Thy bosom has breath; it does not have a heart
- Pure in nature thou art, thy nature is light
- Muslims have lost the passion of love they had
- Conquer the world with the power of Selfhood
- Dew—drops glisten on flowers that bloom in the spring
- Reason is but a wayside lamp that gives
- Give the young, O Lord, my passionate love for Thee
- Thine is the world of birds and beasts, O Lord!
- Thank Thee, O Lord, I am not without talent born
- He is the essence of the worlds of space and spirit
- Love is sometimes a wanderer in the woods
- Love seeks sometimes the solitude of hills
- Grant me the absorption of souls of the past
- It was Abul Hassan who stressed the truth
- This reason of mine knows not good from evil
- To be God is to do a million tasks
- So man is the powerful lord of land and seas!
- The mystic's soul is like the morning breeze
- That blood of pristine vigour is no more
- The movement of days and nights is eternal, fast
- Selfhood's apostate is the life of reason
- Thy body knows not the secrets of thy heart
- Stanza: Iqbal recited once in a garden in spring

Poems

- A Prayer
- The Mosque of Cordova
- Spain
- Tariq’s Prayer
- Lenin before God
- Song of the Angels
- Ecstasy
- To Javid
- Mendicancy
- The Mullah and Paradise
- Church and State
- The Earth is God's
- To a Young Man
- An Advice
- The Wild Flower
- To the ‘Saqi’
- This Age
- The Angels Bid Farewell to Adam
- Adam is Received by the Spirit of the Earth
- Rumi and Iqbal
- Gabriel and Satan
- Azan
- Love
- The Star's Message
- To Javid
- Philosophy and Religion
- A Letter from Europe
- At Napoleon’s Tomb
- To the Punjab Peasant
- Nadir Shah of Afghanistan
- The Tartar's Dream
- Worlds Apart
- Cinema
- To the Punjab Pirs
- Separation
- Monastery
- Satan’s Petition
- The Eagle
- The Rebellious Disciple
- Stanza: Barter not thy Selfhood for silver and gold
- Stanza: The mentor exhorted his. disciples once

== See also ==
- Index of Muhammad Iqbal–related articles
- Javid Nama
- Payam-i-Mashriq
- Zabur-i-Ajam
- Pas Chih Bayad Kard ay Aqwam-i-Sharq
- Bang-e-Dara
- Asrar-i-Khudi
- Rumuz-e-Bekhudi
- Zarb-i-Kalim
- Armaghan-i-Hijaz
