= Gift from Hijaz =

Poetry book of Allama Iqbal

- Author: Muhammad Iqbal
- Publication date: 1938

Armaghan-i-Hijaz (Urdu: ارمغان حجاز; or The Gift of the Hijaz; originally published in Persian, 1938) was a philosophical poetry book of Allama Iqbal, the great poet-philosopher of Islam.

== Introduction ==
This work, published a few months after the poet's death, is a fairly small volume containing verses in both Persian and Urdu. It is incomplete, although this is not readily apparent to the reader; for Iqbal left some gaps in the book which he intended to fill when he made the pilgrimage to Mecca. The title means "Gift from the Hijaz". He had long wished to undertake the journey to the Arabian Peninsula to perform the Hajj and to visit the tomb of Muhammad, but was prevented from doing so by continuous illness during the last years of his life. Iqbal began composing the "Armaghan" as a gift to take to the Hijaz, intending to publish it on his return to India as a "Gift from the Hijaz" to his countrymen.

It is divided into two parts, the first containing Persian, the second Urdu poems. The Persian verses, all in ruba'i form, are divided into five groups and present God the Truth, Muhammad, the Muslim nation, Mankind and the "Companions on the Path to God."

The second part comprises Urdu poems composed between 1935 and the time of Iqbal's death and includes a poem describing the ideological confusion of the poet's time and its impact on Muslims.

In this work, Iqbal touches on practically every question with which he had been preoccupied during his life of intellectual striving and literary achievement. The poems which comprise this final work give the impression that the writer has at last found the tranquility he had for so long sought:

The song that has gone may come again – or may not.
A fresh breeze may come from Hijaz – or may not.
The days of this poor humble man are ended;
Another knower of secrets may come – or may not.

== Topics ==
Preface

HAZOOR-I-HAQ
I

- They held the loveless is heart and went away
- My being and non-being were topics on tips
- My heart rakes often knots of 'how' and 'why'
- What a noisy display of mud and clay
- Who brought the wide world on the cosmos scene

II

- My heart not prisoned is writhing with pain
- O Amrine, thou hast turn'd the cup of wine
- The self writhing hearts are captives of lures
- I tread a path there which leads no where
- Keep off my wine from shallow hearted meeks
- Thou hast no quest in thy efforts and zeals
- Bid me shake the world with a cry and hue
- A gloom still lurking in broad day light
- Thy slave I'm and seek thy pleasure alone

III

- My heart knows not the bliss of His flame
- How to tell tale of 'Deen' and father land
- A Muslim tied up with a foreign land
- I wish not this world nor cosmos whole
- What ye hopes from an easy going bloke

IV

- I seek for that nation a rising field
- How long shall you gaze with a wrathful stare?
- That bliss of the past may come or not
- If so e'er comes that gifted mystic sage
- My heart is wealth mine who knows pang's pine

V

- To lose heart to some one he did not know
- My heart so restive is fleeing from me
- I donned big circles on a likewise night
- Knows not the Gabriel this hue and cry
- The sky seldom sees alike this age

VI

- Get me Seenay's truth, and love of his name

VII

- A Muslim gloats in hunger and patches
- A nation again whom duty is dear
- A nation again whose hearts would adorn

VIII

- Thy world is ruled by misers few
- A hungry seeker begged his Sheikh to plead

IX

- Looking in a mess is Indian State
- From bondage a Moslem is a self sold guy

X

- So calculate once all the losses and gains
- What is the lasting life is known to thee

XI

- When the old world gets its apex of height
- My body is tired but soul still flies

HAZOOR-I-RISALAT
I

- O, tent chamberlain! leave the tent hark
- I keep my eyes penchant on hearts essence
- I know not who dazzled and killed this heart
- Ask not of lustre drunk's caravan scene
- I cherish for Yasrib though I am old

II

- To love'an rapture sins gave a common sense
- You ask the spots where I played my jazz there

III

- That dawn I asked naqah not to run quick
- She needs no reins O I teamster hence!
- Yet tears moist vivid in jet black eyes

IV

- How lucky are deserts caravan lines
- Hail the desert whose eve is morning gay

V

- Who's that Ajmi as head of caravan
- A place in love and raptures was his aim

VI

- A hidden grief untold is clear
- In pits grow poppies from vernal tide

VII

- A page of Iraqi sometimes I turn
- Let the hiker's grief take a blissful turn

VIII

- Come O! chum for a tie to weep and cry
- To wise he gave less wealth and affluence
- The world with four sides I have in arm-pit
- In this valley lies a lasting life new

IX

- A Muslim was a king and saint so high
- The heart takes heat from thy love pangs' flame
- No morn yet to slaves O Indian night
- As such I say to a. soft-hearted soul
- A friend's hidden life how can I reveal
- The sky still going on a perverse course
- In his pure blood shines not that vigour and heat
- He made his heart captive of pomp and show
- To him the heart's door is not open yet

X

- His collar is torn, he cares no darn
- Give him his dues, of a captive and meek
- Refine his morals and life once more
- The bride of life, in him is not his own
- His eyes are void of a glamour and glee
- Though born as Muslim yet knows not the death

XI

- The kingship as whole is trick and skill
- A Muslim's stuff has a lifelong stay
- Ashamed is Muslim for losing his State
- Ask me not of his present day lot
- I have scanned the whole world through his eye
- The Muslims have raised no armament wings
- The assets of Sheikh were the fables old
- He brought a total change in faithless world
- From fane gets Harem its grandeur and glare
- As long in mosque the poor kept a row
- The Moslems are fighting with brothers own
- To others than God we touch our brows
- In the hands of drinkers the empty glass
- The synagogues bottles are void of wine
- The Muslims are foreigns on every land
- With wings you gave I judge and fly
- At night before Lord I often cry
- I speak not now of the grandeur past
- The guard of Harem is the mason of fane
- From this poor man's flame, sitting on his way
- Like gallants I fall and rise again
- Let me sob and sigh in a lone retreat
- I fly in the airy lovelier space
- Of secret I'told, they paid no heed
- To stick it to bosom this verse aims not
- You bid me for a theme on bliss lifelong
- My face looks saffron from arcane pain
- The meek utter hence of yonder glance
- Those who knew not I preached them ego
- What I hold in heart is grief and remorse
- A poor, ruthfull flutist who taught love's tone
- I seek not my vigour from morning air
- I'am in a sea which has no coast side
- Drive not from door who are longing for thee
- On idols white my heart is sweet
- From Western taverns the wines I take
- I seek from thy door, whatever I seek
- With 'mullah' or 'Sufi' I do not sit
- The 'mullah' never knows the pangs of grief
- On pulpit his address a venom of bile
- The heart of lucent hearts he took or I?
- An alien I am within my own race
- For any one's boon this heart owes not
- My craze still feels the same burning phase
- This dust still feels His living flame
- My glance looks not the world's hollow game
- I have been born in a flameless age
- The 'rose and poppy' lack my 'scent and shade.
- So alien I am in West and East
- I broke the magic of the modern age
- You have lit up my eyes with an insight
- When I pressed myself in my own embrace
- The world has charms like paradise true
- Bid him O lord! a holy man's lead
- Move around O bearer! the wine cup's course
- For love the world came from thee the love's flame
- To me this burning a boon of thy glow
- This heart, I tied not with aught in this fane
- Grow that poppy from the dust of mine
- To my shining race I would love to groan
- For the sake of truth of my free lance tone
- I hold a heart in hand find not a beau
- Like Rumi I raised His call in Harem whole
- Raise a garden new from dust of mine
- A Muslim is resting from coast to coast
- Who told him I smell thee 'under the rose'
- From thy own main give pearls to my rill
- In a gathering see my flute's tones sweet
- I kept beaming face in this or that case
- I have shared the poppy's flame and pain
- With thy light alone I lit up my glance
- I need in thy land just a melting sigh

XII

- I hold very dear that roaring roar
- Look to these saucy Anglican maids
- Give a helping hand to those who are weak

XIII

- You too take the wine from friend's cup warm
- A poor man I'm, you hold the 'Arab's reign
- A look of pain I'm and see no cure quick
- Let tis join hands to spread his love's flame
- You hold a high place in the desert's land
- Being Muslims we make no home and false ties
- To Anglian idols pay not a heed

HAZOOR-I-MILLAT
I
AN ODE TO UMMAH

- Be nearer to the aim like a moon new
- My self's own sea gave a rise to me
- Come O' bearer and move the cup of Wine
- Come O' bearer and raise the veils aside
- Raise from thy bosom a 'Call of God Great'
- From self a Muslim is man perfect
- As long the Muslim, in self can peep,
- The veils of thy fortune lo! I ope
- Now all the shut doors for Turks are ope
- A nation whose spring falls to decay
- God gave that nation a sway o'er lands
- From Razi thus learn the Quran's insight

II
EGO

- Who makes Ego firm by 'Lailah's tie
- O ignorant man get a knowing heart
- Thy heart keeps not that hidden scar

III
ANAL HAQ (I AM GOD)

- A place of I am God is God's own place
- I am the God suits to that nation lone
- Among nations large she holds a place great
- From her inner verve that race is a flame
- Like a unique race thus She flies in space
- In garden's lawn he is song bird sweet
- Fill the old wine in the New Age bowl

IV
SUFI AND MULLAH

- The Mullah and Sufi are cross in deed
- When the English subdued the mosque and fane
- To Mullah and Sufi thou art a slave
- Through the mirror of Quran see thy deeds
- I salute the Mullah and Sufi old
- On hell kafir-maker MulIah spoke
- A well read disciple asked his guide
- Thus spoke to his son a guide in patched robe

V
RUMI

- Pour in thy self that old wine again
- Take from his cup those poppy like stems
- From his verve and heat I got a good share
- Being full of pathos and passion's heat
- He solved many ties I had to face
- To me his heart's door was always ope
- His thought thus flies with stars and moon rays
- Take secrets of content from Rumi's call
- When self is deprived from godly tint
- That bright wine scattered from my wineyard

VI
THE MESSAGE OF FAROOQ (HAZRAT UMAR)

- O desert's breeze rise from 'Arab's sky
- Tue Faqr and Caliphate with King's Crown shine
- A young man who peeps in his ego deep
- For sense and heart's sake leave each door ajar
- How happy is the race who wins her goal
- That Turkish seaman how sang a song gay
- The world rule is destined to my own dust
- To certitude truth who so ever knew
- A Muslim who tested his own ego first

VII
TO THE ARAB POET

- To Arab poets sweet on my part say
- I caused in his soul a verve a heat
- You leave making now the portraits on wall
- My heart has a grief, and dust has a heart
- Of virtues of God Muslim has a part
- Give to his dust that flame and might
- A Muslim you were named for grief's bargain
- On whom were opened the secrets of soul
- So guard the nature of thy mud and dust
- The hill and desert night defies thy day
- Read the clear writing on thy forehead's slate

VIII
O SON OF THE DESERT

- When all the desert sides were bright from dawn
- The Truth chose Arab for caravan's lead
- Those nights had the uproar for future's dawn

IX
FROM THIS DUST A RIDER COMES
DO YOU KNOW?

- Learn the ways to win His pleasure and grace
- If a craze consumes the garden's face
- The poppy of my dawn's first vernal tide
- So scattered I'm like dust of the way
- How lucky a nation whom wheel of fate
- In self's own sea, I'm thus a restive' wave
- His glance would fill up the empty bowl
- The caravans reins he would take when
- To that holy mother I greet with pride
- My heart thus says that the hero will hail

X
THE CALIPHATE AND MONARCHY

- The Arabs gained a lot from Prophet's light
- Take the Caliphate's witness with a heed
- A Moses grapples with kingdoms all
- The Adam is slave in this world yet
- The love, from his glance is stable and best

XI
TURKS OF OTTOMAN EMPIRE

- In the Ottoman reign, the Turks are free
- How daring were they who broke his charms
- The fate thus gave to Turks a verve anew

XII
TO DAUGHTERS OF THE NATION

- Learn O' daughterling this loveliness trend
- A God given sword thy glance to thee
- At last modern age shows her conscience lo!
- The world is stable from the mother's grace
- That nation is lucky in whose hard race
- This craze she gave me for sharp wits sense
- If you pay a heed once, to this poor guy
- From my evening's dusk get a dawn new

XIII
THE MODERN AGE

- What is the age? On whom the faith cries
- His glance only paints the heathen's shade
- To youths of this age he taught evil ways
- The Muslim draws content and kingship close
- The dance you now play in this or that way

XIV
BRAHMEN

- For him, he opened hundred doors for plots
- To Brahmen I say not a useless bloke
- A pundit keeps eyes on his own task
- The Brahmen said leave this white man's door

XV
EDUCATION

- A shine which lasts with beauty and grace
- A knowledge which cures but melts not to trance
- No links with that Momin the God would keep
- A blind eye is better from eyes crook
- No use of a thought which measures sky
- Respect is the dress of a sage or fool
- Why you lose hopes of kids a bit
- Teach the offspring wisdom and faith's ken
- Who sapp'd sweet tone of the birds and buds
- The days of that 'Dervesh' O God keep gay
- Who e'er tied himself with Lailah's tie
- A caravan was killed, if you e'er see
- A well dressed fighter and handsome guy
- To a camel addressed its youngest foal

XVI
SEARCH FOR FOOD AND LIVING

- If the hawks too fly for roof to roof race
- See thy own self with a seeing eye

XVII
A CROCODILE TO ITS YOUNG

- Thus said to its child a 'croco' with boast
- In sea you are not it lies but in thee

XVIII
THE FINIS

- I talk not of bearer nor of bowl hence
- Back to ego turn, and back to heart look
- For heart and eyes course, the ‘Harem’ is the aim

A MESSAGE TO MANKIND
Introduction
I

- O bearer come and serve the old wine
- Leave thy solitude cell for a while please

II

- With times came unrest which passed so quick
- Those who had fears for the future days

III

- Like nightingale you know not the groans and wails
- Come forward and learn the self seeing art
- Give up the habit to weep on fate
- A gull said to shaver, nice witty thing
- You had fallen then from a godly place
- I hail that day when he turns to self's bold
- Like me you are too wrapped in a veil
- A camel once said a nice word to foal

IV

- I know many savants and gems of west
- Hark! O victim of wits of aliens few

V

- This being would last or just a passing show
- With battle axe smite the Bistoon Mountain
- Keep the crave's lamp burning ever in heart
- O heart's sea! no peace yet known to thee
- To both the worlds win with efforts and zeal
- You show us O Poppy! thy self's own trace

VI

- A man weeps not from a grief or pains
- If a tested man dies think not ever
- If thy dust has no link with soul and heart
- My each breath blows with griefs many more
- A young who tied heart with ego's call
- Such griefs this heart now likes to take
- Blame not the God for this or that hurt
- Turn out fire of envy from thy heart's core
- In his nights behold many dawns bright

VII

- To the morning breeze' weep'd the dew' in trance

VIII
HEART

- The heart is a sea which likes no shore
- My heart is a fire, a smoke my frame
- His help the world seeks like his slave own
- The Ego's power he did not try
- You say the heart is the Khak and Khoon
- The world of Sun and Moon, slave of his thread
- We are God's harvest its yield is heart
- To that rare beauty my heart seeks again
- The heart's world is not world of pomp and show
- The glance brought eyes and wisdom a tape band
- What is the love? an impact of glance

IX
EGO

- The Ego is lucent from God's light rays
- When a nation gives up gossip's course
- From God's own being, the 'self' got a 'being' so
- The friendship of rose a heart likes when
- His parting's prick in my tête-à-tête lies
- The dusty look I hold owes to His door

X
COMPULSION AND OPTION

- I am quite certain that on the doomsday
- In city of Room a pontiff told me

XI
DEATH

- The death once said to God in this way
- To king of six nooks give a lasting soul

XII
SAY TO SATAN

- From me please give to Satan a message
- As long He made not this wide world anew
- The separation gave to zeal great spur
- He drove thee out from the Heavens first
- My rights and the wrongs you already know
- Let us play a chess like a royal game

XIII
EARTH'S SATAN AND HELL'S SATAN

- From this world's clear violence the man is sick
- Look the demons dash on ear and eyelash
- What a devil who likes a backward gait
- What a venomed wine he holds in his bowl
- Yet the man lies fallen from the high place
- To Satans of this age be not a prey
- His blows counterpart is a man complete
- To sense of the means it is far off though

TO FRIENDS OF COMMON CREED (SAME PATH)
I

- The Qalandar is a bold hawk of sky
- When the Allah Hoo's tick did hit my soul
- In the heart of nature like tears I groan
- In logic I feel a smell of raws
- Come and take from me that old wine's bowl
- The same old harp I hold in my hand
- To tyrants of this age I would thus say
- A poor I am whose asset is glance
- My heart's door I shut not to any one
- No pomp and show I have in this globe
- Some points were discussed by hundred wise men
- The science or art points I claim not to wield
- I boast not to be a song bird of dawn
- This world is a path to my eyes and sense
- With nothingness learn to live with grace
- For long I'm gaining from this dusty mart
- You cant learn aught 'sans' a conscious soul
- Get a self-knowing eye and see thy soul
- The wisdom knows not the certitude eyes
- What are the clothes, gold jewels and gems?
- To self my wine gives full sense and poise
- For robes and turbans why you feel a bent
- As soon I espied my ego's essence
- When I packed my self from this dusty fuss

II

- If a wise man holds clean conscience and soul

III

- You are bowing head to 'Dara' and 'Jam'
- I heard a nice verse from a man old
- The being's secret hids in two words of sage
- The being's secret hids in two words of sage
- Two worlds of old man I keep in mind still
- A restive wave said once to a coast
- If this pomp and show the Anglian boon
- To Anglians thus the hearts do not own

IV

- We are despaired of heart and faith's way
- His path's true sign if a Muslim could know
- O callous heart make not a link with clay
- In Truth and certitude lies the love's place
- For Muslim 'this is the gnosis and ken
- You handed over thee to idols white
- A self maker and melter each cant be
- A Momin burns thus in his being's own heat
- What is lovers s service, prayers of beaus?
- He calls both worlds to Quran by prays

V

- The English mind knows God's Food Law Rules
- A long tale serves no service in a sense
- A paradise lies for the pious alone

VI

- This dervesh knows not a style in speech

== See also ==
- Index of Muhammad Iqbal–related articles
- Madani–Iqbal debate
