= Message from the East =

1923 book by Muhammad Iqbal

Payam-i-Mashriq (Persian: پیامِ مشرق, or Message from the East, published in Persian) is a philosophical poetic work written by Muhammad Iqbal and published in 1923 as a reply to Goethe's West-östlicher Diwan.

== Introduction ==
Payam-i-Mashriq is an answer to West-östlicher Diwan by Goethe.

=== History ===
Iqbal started writing the book soon after the end of World War I. He first talked about it in a letter to his friend, the scholar Syeed Suleman Nadvi, in 1919:

"At present, I am writing a reply to the Divan of a Western poet (i.e. Goethe) and about half of it has been completed. Some poems will be in Persian and some in Urdu... Two great German poets, Goethe and Uhland, were barristers. After practising for a short time Goethe was appointed as an educational adviser to the state of Weimar and, thus, found much time to pay attention to his artistic intricacies. Uhland devoted his whole life to the law suits, and, therefore, he could write a few poems."

The Payam has been rightly acclaimed as "a genuine attempt by an eminent Eastern poet, endowed with knowledge of Western literature and thought...to enter into a dialogue with Europe." The work includes a collection of quatrains, followed by a group of poems setting forth Iqbal's philosophy of life in lyrical form and some poetical sketches that picture European poets, philosophers, and politicians.

== See also ==
- Index of Muhammad Iqbal–related articles
