= Index of Muhammad Iqbal–related articles =

This page list topics related to Muhammad Iqbal.

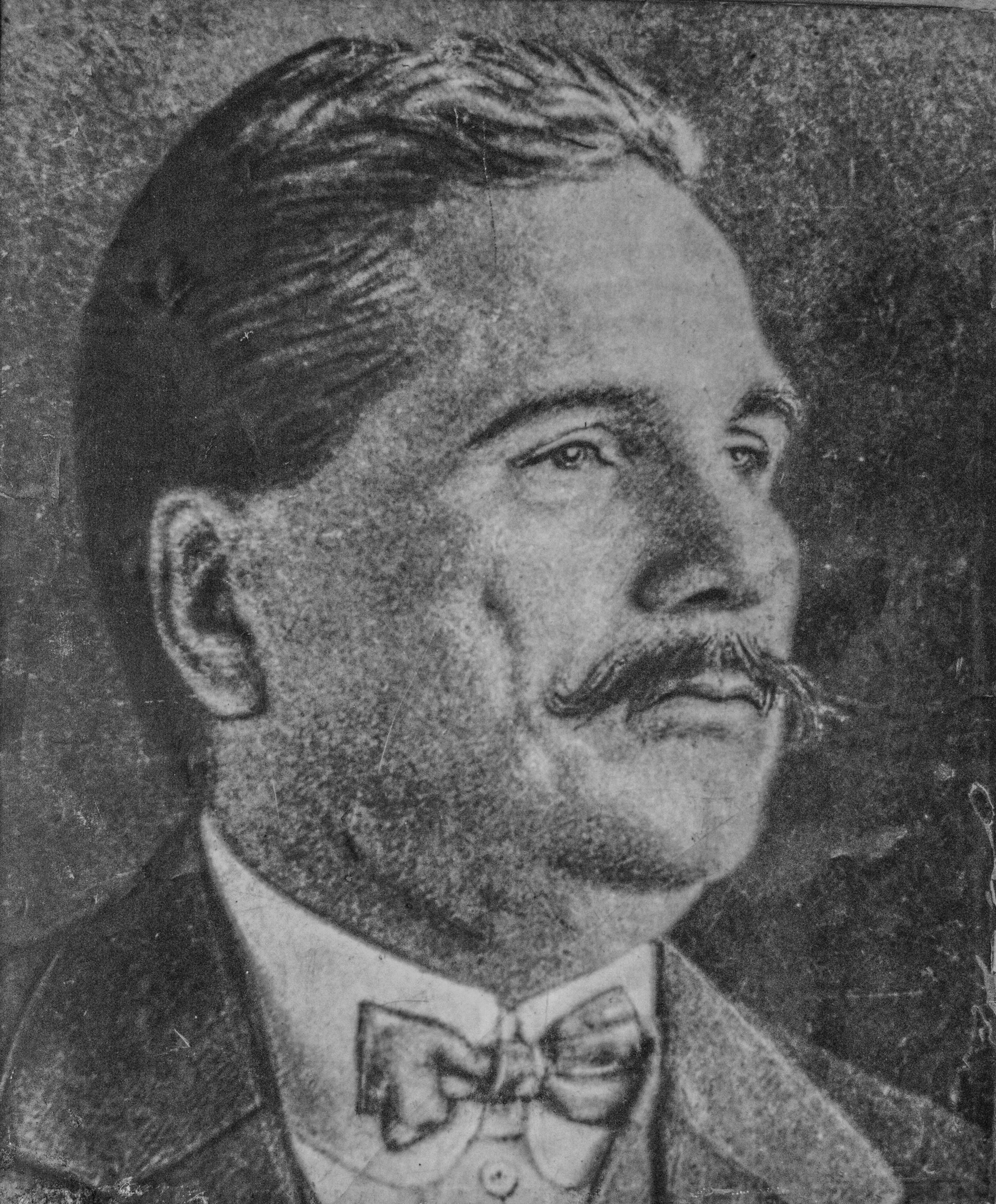
Allama Dr Muhammad Iqbal

- Muhammad Iqbal's concept of Khudi
- Muhammad Iqbal's political philosophy
- Muhammad Iqbal's educational philosophy
- Madani–Iqbal debate
- Muhammad Iqbal bibliography
- Allahabad Address
- Works of Muhammad Iqbal
- Iqbal Academy Pakistan

Poems

- Iblees Ki Majlis-e-Shura
- Sare Jahan se Accha
- Tarana-e-Milli
- The Mosque of Cordoba (Masjid e Qurtuba)
- Lab Pe Aati Hai Dua
- Khizr-i-Rah
- Saqi Namah
- Tulu'i Islam
- Khizr-i-Rah
- Gulshan-i Raz-i Jadid

Works by Iqbal

- Ilm ul-Iqtisad
- Tarikh-i-Hind (History of India)
- The Call of the Marching Bell (Bang-e-Dara)
- The Development of Metaphysics in Persia
- Gift from Hijaz (Armaghan-e-Hijaz)
- Javid Nama
- Message from the East (Payam-i-Mashriq)
- The Reconstruction of Religious Thought in Islam
- The Rod of Moses (Zarb-e-Kaleem)
- Gabriel's Wing (Bal e Jibril)
- Persian Psalms (Zabur-i-Ajam)
- Shikwa and Jawab-e-Shikwa
- The Secrets of the Self (Asrar-i-Khudi)
- The Secrets of Selflessness (Rumuz-i-Bekhudi)
- What Should Then Be Done O People of the East (Pas Cheh Bayad Kard ay Aqwam-i-sharq)
- Discourses of Iqbal (A Collection of essays, speeches and statements)

Works about Iqbal

- Glory of Iqbal
- Zinda Rood

Family members

- Javed Iqbal
- Nasira Iqbal
- Yousuf Salahuddin
- Walid Iqbal

Memorials

- Tomb of Allama Iqbal
- Javed Manzil
- Iqbal Stadium
- Iqbal Review
- Iqbal Manzil
- Iqbal Day
- Gulshan-e-Iqbal
- Greater Iqbal Park
- Dhobi Ghat Park
- Allama Iqbal Open University
- Allama Iqbal Medical College
- Allama Iqbal International Airport
- Iqbal Academy Pakistan
- Plaza de Pakistán

Iqbal scholars

- Syed Nazeer Niazi
- Aziz Ahmad
- Nasim Amrohvi
- Arthur John Arberry
- Jagan Nath Azad
- Dewan Mohammad Azraf
- Yousaf Saleem Chishti
- Zaid Hamid
- Riffat Hassan
- Javed Iqbal
- Ghulam Mustafa Khan
- Ghulam Rasool Mehr
- Muhammad Munawwar Mirza
- Reynold A. Nicholson
- Waheed Qureshi
- Ayub Sabir
- Israr Ahmed
- Jawad Naqvi
- Annemarie Schimmel
- Ali Shariati
- Eva de Vitray-Meyerovitch
- Yousaf Saleem Chishti
