= Ghaus Bakhsh Sabir =

Pakistani scholar and playwright

- Born: 29 March 1938; Kach Walhari, Ziarat District, Balochistan, British India
- Died: April 2015 (aged 77)
- Occupations: Scholar; playwright; poet
- Organization(s): Radio Pakistan, Pakistan Academy of Letters
- Awards: Presidential Iqbal Award in 2022

Ghaus Bakhsh Sabir (1938 - 2015) was a Pakistani scholar, author, playwright, and poet. He was associated with Radio Pakistan, Pakistan Television, National Language Authority, and Pakistan Academy of Letters.

== Biography ==
Sabir was born on 29 March 1938 in village Kach Walhari, Sibi District, Balochistan, British India. He was a self-taught person with a strong passion for book-reading. His poem "Jee Nai Qalam" made him popular in the literary circle of Balochistan. He started getting published in the weekly "Balochi" magazine from Karachi. He also began his career as a scriptwriter at the Radio Pakistan's Quetta Centre.

After the launch of television in Pakistan, he also wrote plays for PTV. Later, he joined the Pakistan Writers Guild. As a researcher and translator, he was also part of the Pakistan Academy of Letters.

Sabir authored several books on Balochi poetry and literature. His Balochi book on Iqbaliat, Shagrab-Shaar, Hakeem-ul-Umat Allama Muhammad Iqbal, was selected for the Presidential Iqbal Award.

== Death ==
Sabir died in April 2015.

== Works ==
- Balochi Zuban-o-Adab, published by Pakistan academy of literature, Islamabad
- Lal e Liqa
- Iqbal, Rosan e Shaham
- Shagrab-Shaar, Hakeem-ul-Umat Allama Muhammad Iqbal

== Awards and recognition ==
Year	Title	Result	Presented by	Ref.
2022	Presidential Iqbal Award fo writing a book on Allama Iqbal in Balochi language.	Won	Iqbal Academy Pakistan	
