= Works of Muhammad Iqbal =

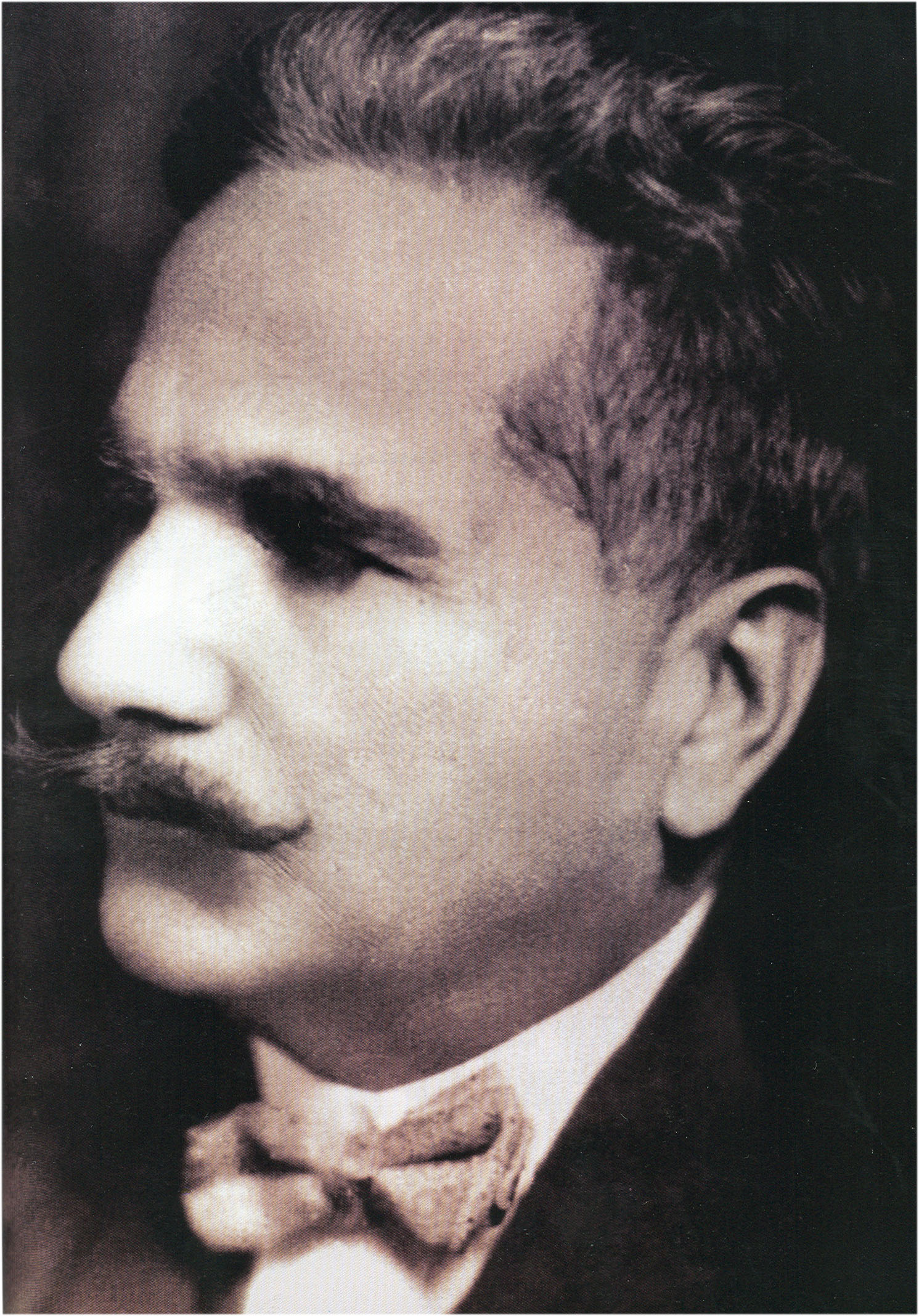
Allama Muhammad Iqbal

Muhammad Iqbal, also known as Allama Iqbal (1877–1938), was a Muslim philosopher, poet, writer, scholar and politician of early 20th century. He is particularly known in the Indian sub-continent for his Urdu philosophical poetry on Islam and the need for the cultural and intellectual reconstruction of the Islamic community. He is also considered the "spiritual father of Pakistan" for inspiring the Pakistan Movement in British India. Iqbal gained particular prominence in 1899, when he recited Nalay-e-Yatem at the annual meeting of Anjuman-e-Himayat-e-Islam, Lahore. The poems he wrote up to 1905 imbibe patriotism that includes the Tarana-e-Hind (popularly known as Saare Jahan Se Achcha). The Bang-e-Dara (1924) is a collection of Urdu poetry written in three distinct phases of Iqbal's life. In his early work, he also wrote on most of the Indian iconic personalities such as Rama Tirtha, Guru Nanak and Rama.

== Style ==
=== First phase ===
The Urdu poetry that Iqbal wrote prior to his visit of Europe in 1905 is considered by critics as the first phase of his poetry that blends Persian mysticism and Indian patriotism.

== Work ==
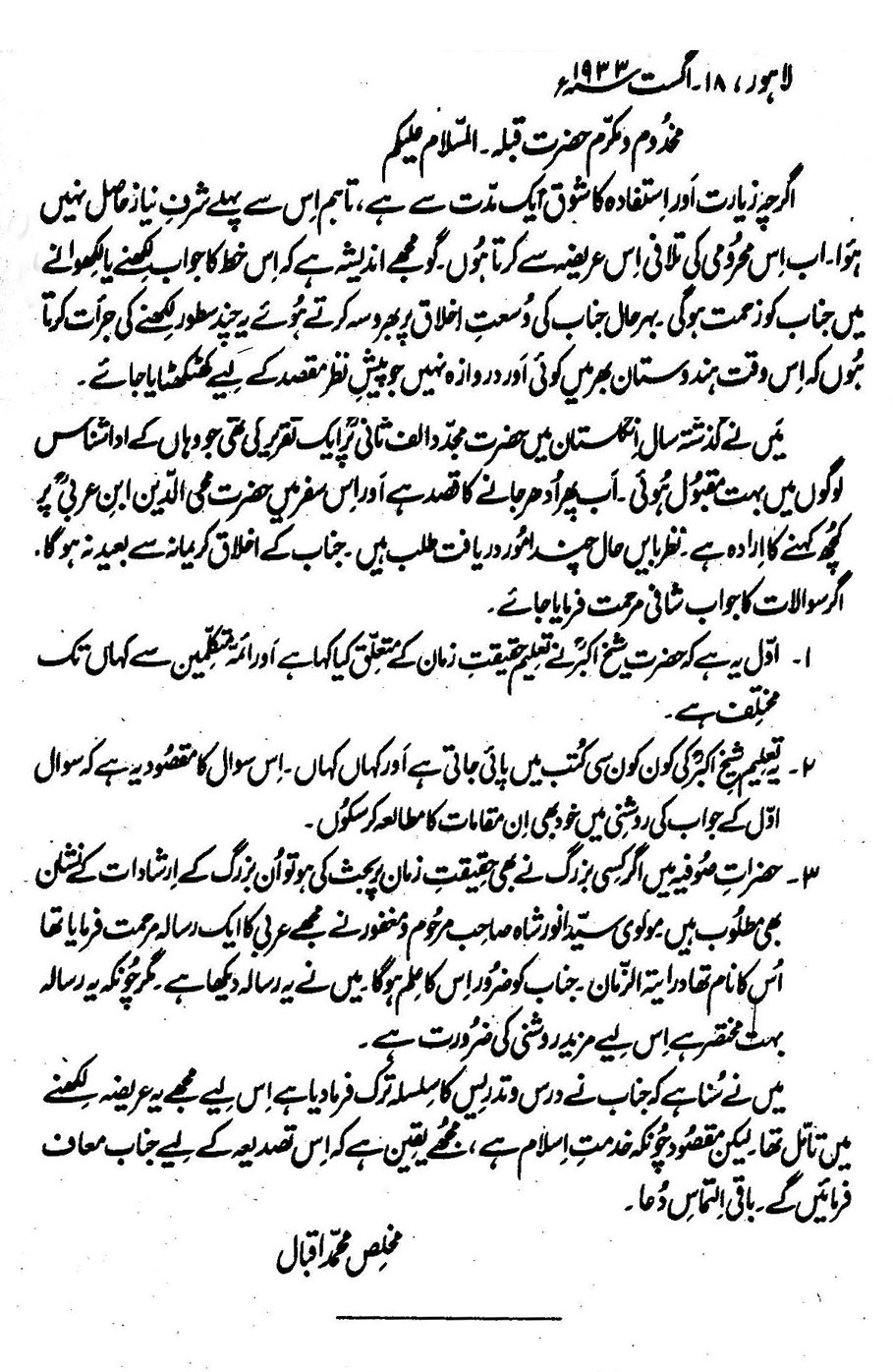
Printed copy of a letter written in Urdu by Muhammad Iqbal to Meher Ali Shah inquiring information about the "Ibn Arabi" concept of Space and Time.

=== Urdu ===
==== Before poetry ====
Iqbal's first published work, with likely date of 1904, was an introductory economics textbook which he wrote as result of his first proper job – teaching of history and political economy to students of Bachelor of Oriental Learning (B.O.L.) in Urdu and translation of English and Arabic works into Urdu at the University Oriental College, Lahore.:

- Iqbal, Sheikh Muhammad (n.d. but 1904 is likely) Ilmul Iqtisad [The Science of Economics]. Lahore: Khadimul-Taleem Steam Press of Paisa Akhbar. 2nd edition (1961), Karachi: Iqbal Academy; Reprinted (1977), Lahore: Iqbal Academy Pakistan; 2nd Reprint (1991), Lahore: Ain.

== Poetry ==
Iqbal's Urdu poetry collection is available in four books.

Book	Published
Bang-i-Dara	1924
Bal-e-Jibril	1935
Zarb-i-Kalim	1936
Armaghan-e-Hijaz	1938

=== Persian ===
- Asrar-i-Khudi (1915)
- Rumuz-i-Bekhudi (1918)
- Payam-i-Mashriq (1923)
- Zabur-i-Ajam (1927)
- Pas Cheh Bayed Kard ai Aqwam-e-Sharq (1936)
- Armughan-e-Hijaz (1938) (in Persian and Urdu)

=== Patriotic poetry ===
- Himalaya
- Naya Shivala
- Tarana-e-Milli
- Tarana-e-Hind

== See also ==
- Index of Muhammad Iqbal–related articles
