= Iblees Ki Majlis-e-Shura =

Urdu poem by Muhammad Iqbal

"Iblees Ki Majlis-e-Shura" (English: The Parliament of Satan) is an Urdu poem written by Muhammad Iqbal in 1936. It describes a meeting of the Devil and his advisers as they discuss the current state of the world. It was described as "a scathing criticism of the major socio-political and economic systems offered by the West."

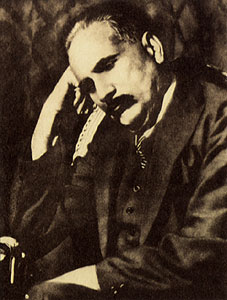
Muhammad Iqbal, then president of the Muslim League in 1930 and address deliverer

== Structure ==
The poem is written as a meeting between Iblees (the first of the Devils, or Satans in Islam) and his five advisers. The first chapter starts with the Devil describing his accomplishments in taking over the world. His five advisers then discuss certain threats they conceive to the Devil's plans, which were explained as various aspects of the Western society such as capitalism, the rise of democracy and on the other hand socialism. The Devil completes the chapter by dismissing his advisers' concerns one by one. The Devil concludes by speculating on a final threat, which he sees as the most critical, the resurgence of Islam.

== Detailed summary ==
The poem begins with Iblis boasting about his role in inspiring imperialism in Europe and instilling the pursuit of capitalism in the wealthy, while teaching the destitute to believe in destiny. He claims to have broken the spell of religious institutions like mosques, temples, and churches. Iblis's first advisor praises the stability of the "Satanic system" and how it has reinforced slavishness among the common people, who have been ordained to prostration since the dawn of time. The advisor argues that their efforts have made even mystics and priests subject to imperialism. The second advisor questions the clamor for "Government by the people," but the first advisor dismisses it as a mere masquerade for imperialism. They argue that imperialism doesn't depend on individual leaders but on the desire to covet others' harvests.

The third advisor raises concerns about a certain "Jew" (possibly a reference to Karl Marx or socialist/communist ideology) who possesses a penetrating vision and threatens the established order. Other advisors discuss how they have inspired the descendants of Caesar with the dream of empire and how European politics have been exposed.

Iblis declares his absolute command over the world and boasts that he can incite madness in the leaders of politics and the church. He dismisses the socialists as a minor threat but warns of the potential menace from the Islamic community, which still retains a spark of ambition. Iblis acknowledges that the Islamic community is no longer the bearer of the Quran and has embraced capitalism instead. However, he expresses apprehension about the potential revival of Islamic law (Sharia), which he views as a threat to slavery, monarchs, and the concentration of wealth.

Iblis advises keeping the Islamic law hidden from the world and ensuring that believers remain entangled in metaphysical debates and interpretations of religious texts. He fears the awakening of the Islamic community, whose religion is about understanding the universe.

== Translation ==
The poem has been translated to English by Abdussalam Puthige titled The Devil’s Advisory Council: Iblees ki Majlis-e-Shoora

== See also ==
- Index of Muhammad Iqbal–related articles
