= Presidential Iqbal Awards =

Literary award

Presidential Iqbal Award
- Awarded for: Best books on Iqbaliat
- Country: Pakistan
- Presented by: Iqbal Academy Pakistan
- First award: 1981; 45 years ago

Presidential Iqbal Award is a literary award which is presented by Iqbal Academy Pakistan with the approval of the President of Pakistan. The award is conferred for the best books written on national poet-philosopher Allama Muhammad Iqbal’s life and ideology in national and foreign languages.

== History ==
Presidential Iqbal Award was started in 1981 under a presidential order by then president of Pakistan Zia-ul-Haq. Later, it was reconstituted by the president Arif Alvi in 2019.

== Categories ==
- Presidential National Iqbal Award (Urdu) – Annual basis
- Presidential National Iqbal Award (English) – Three year basis
- Presidential Iqbal Award (Pakistani Languages) – Three year basis
- Presidential International Iqbal Award – Three year basis

== Recipients ==
Some of recipients of the Presidential Iqbal Award from 1981 to 2014 are Ghulam Mustafa Khan, Syed Nazeer Niazi, Bashir Ahmad Dar, Iftikhar Ahmad Siddiqui, Muhammad Munawwar Mirza, Syed Abdullah, Waheed Qureshi, Fateh Muhammad Malik, and Rafiuddin Hashmi.

Year	Author	Title	Language	Ref.
1999; 2015 - 2020	Muhammad Ikram Chughtai	Iqbal, Goethe, and the Orient; Iqbal Aur Germany	English; Urdu	
2015 - 2020	Dr Abdul Khaliq	Allama Iqbal: Concept of Ego and Related Perspectives	English	
2015 - 2020	Ghaus Bakhsh Sabir	Shagrab-Shaar, Hakeem-ul-Umat Allama Muhammad Iqbal Shah Zant wa Shahshanab Zandwazam	Balochi	
