= Saqi Namah =

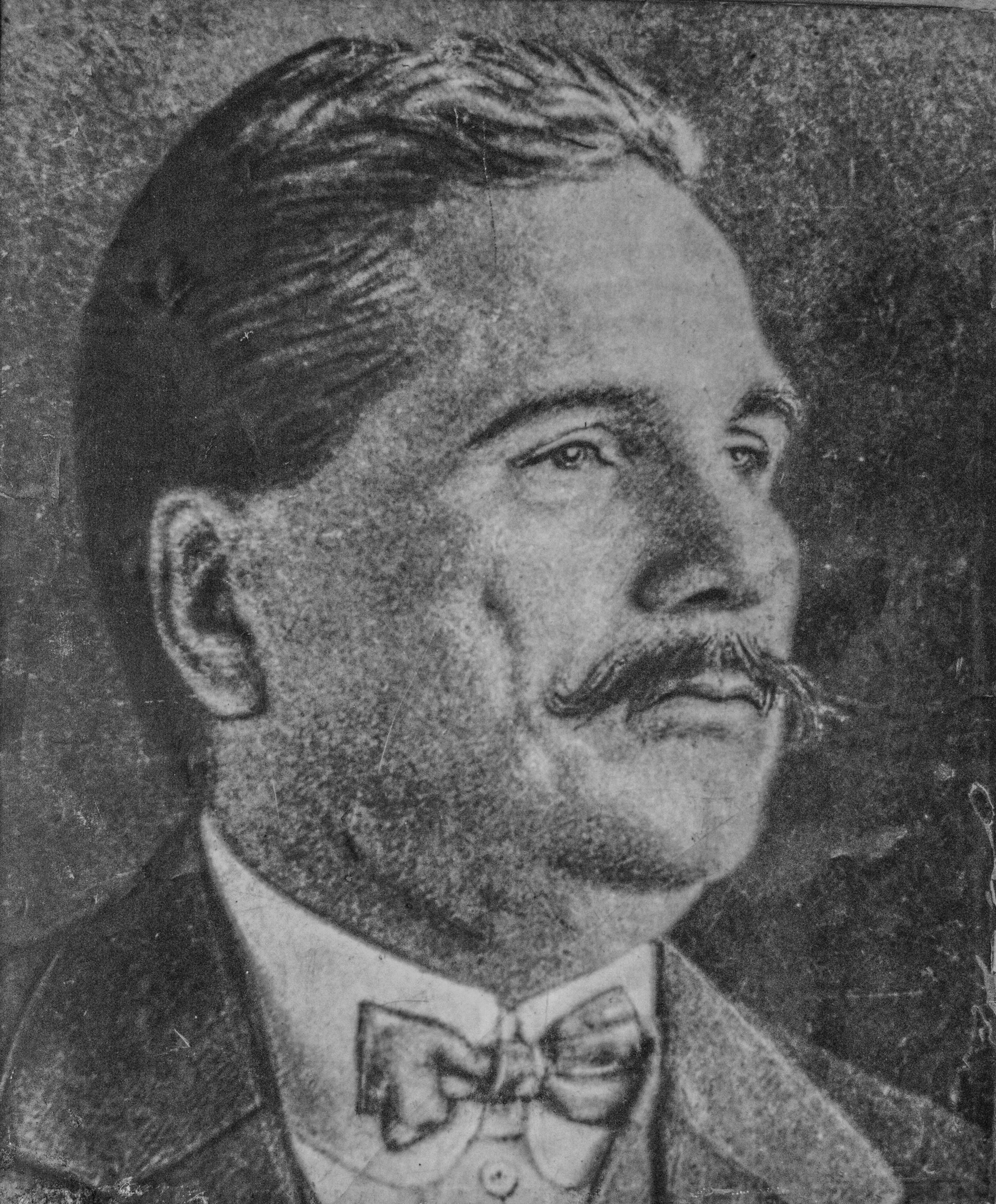
Allama Dr Muhammad Iqbal

Saqi Namah (Urdu: ساقی نامہ), often transliterated in English as Saqi Nama, is an Urdu nazm written by Muhammad Iqbal in 1935. This is one of Iqbal's most famous long poems apart from Tulu'i Islam, Shikwah and Jawab-e-Shikwah. This poem was published in his book, Baal-e-Jibreel, often translated in English as Gabriel's Wing.

== Theme of the poem ==
The central theme of the poem is Muslim Renaissance. Iqbal sketches changing order of the world's political system and laments that Islamic nations are still devoid of that awakening. He prays to Almighty Allah to bestow Muslims with wisdom and awareness. The word saqi is translated in English as a bartender. The word has been extensively used as a metaphor in Persian poetry for lover, friends, poet's alter ego and even for Almighty God. Iqbal has used the word saqi as a poetic reference to Allah.

== Structure of the poem ==
The poem is divided in seven stanzas and gradually proceeds to its central theme that actually occurs in stanza three. Each stanza has twelve ashaa’r (couplet). In the first stanza Iqbal has narrated the exultation of nature on the arrival of a new world order, although, the cause of exultation has not been indicated. He has used the entities of living worlds (such as flowers and birds) and physical worlds (mountains and rivers) to bring out the energy of this changing world order. Iqbal opens the poem by welcoming bahaar the season of spring. After having described the jocundity of natural elements during springs, Iqbal addresses Saqi, admitting that the spring is a timely event and will go soon. He pleads Saqi to bestow the knowledge of spirituality and ethereal wisdom on him – the knowledge that has been referred as mae (wine).

In the second stanza Iqbal narrates the changing world order. He acknowledges that how political structure in politically, philosophically and scientifically developed Europe is heading from monarchy to democracy and how the social order based on capitalism is being challenged. Iqbal hints how countries like and India and China are emerging as a nation developing their own social structure. Finally, Iqbal comes to Islamic nations and criticises them for lack of their zeal to reinvent calling them as dead ashes.

In the following stanzas (third to seventh), Iqbal makes as strong appeal to his Saqi to incite the Islamic nations with zeal to reinvent themselves. Though Iqbal makes references to Indian Muslims, to fight against the colonial British, in general he makes appeal for Islamic Nations. Iqbal urges for the inculcation of Khudi (self, a concept of Iqbal), stating that the best bread is the bread that is earned with self-respect and any bread earned at the cost of Khudi is a poison.

== See also ==
- Index of Muhammad Iqbal–related articles
