= Vartha Bharati =

Kannada-language daily newspaper in India

Vartha Bharathi

- Type: Daily newspaper
- Format: Broadsheet
- Owner: The Community Media Trust
- Founder: Abdussalam Puthige
- Publisher: Abdussalam Puthige
- Editor: Abdussalam Puthige
- News editor: B.M. Bashir
- Founded: 29 August 2003
- Language: Kannada
- Headquarters: Mangalore, Karnataka, India.
- Website: www.varthabharati.in
- Free online archives: epaper.varthabharati.in

Vartha Bharati. also spelled as Vartha Bharathi, is a Kannada daily newspaper published simultaneously from Bangalore, Mangalore, Kalaburagi and Shimoga. It was launched in August 2003. It is one of nine state level Kannada daily newspapers of Karnataka, as recognised by the Information and Public Relations Department, Government of Karnataka.

Its main focus was to provide voice and due representation to the deprived and marginalised sections. Jnanpith and Padma Bhushan awardee U. R. Anantha Murthy was a great admirer and a regular contributor to this newspaper. In a public meeting, he called Vartha Bharati "The Guardian of Karnataka", saying that "The Guardian has created a revolution in the whole of its nation. In the same way, Vartha Bharathi is Karnataka's Guardian." Abdussalam Puthige, the editor-in-chief of Varthabharati was inspired by veteran journalist Vaddarse Raghuram Shetty, who had launched Mungaru Kannada daily back in 1984. Mungaru was well known for its generous policy of providing fair representation to all castes, communities and sections of the society. It left a significant mark in the history of Kannada journalism by identifying and nurturing several talents from Muslim, Christian and backward Communities.

Numerous well-known Kannada leftists, social activists and Dalit ideologues, including U. R. Ananthamurthy, U. B. Banakar, Dr. Niranjan Aradhya, write regularly for the paper. In 2017, a Vartha Bharati journalist was detained and served a showcause notice by the Dakshina Kannada police. The notice was later stayed by the Karnataka High Court. In 2017, Vartha Bharati's social media page was blocked by Facebook. Though it was later restored, there was no clear explanation as to why it happened.

== Special issues ==
Copies of Vaartha Bhaarathi

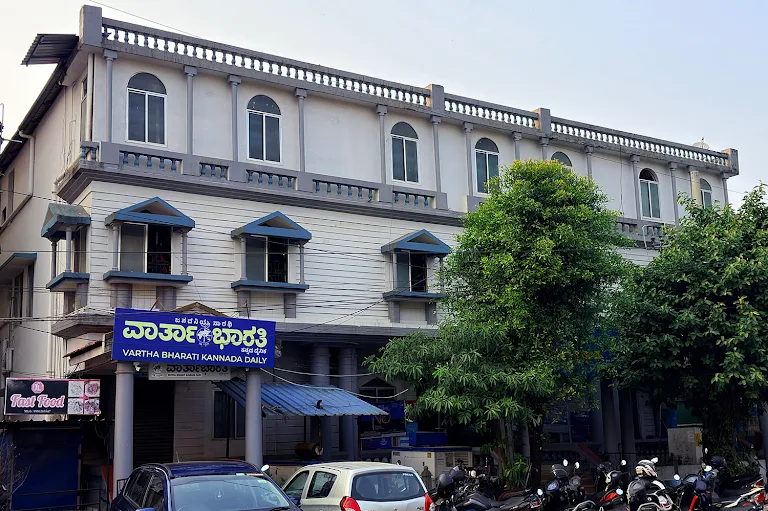
Head office building at Valencia, Mangalore

- Karnataka Chief Minister Siddaramaiah released the 14th annual issue of Vartha Bharati at his office on 13 October 2016
- Karnataka Chief Minister Siddaramaiah released the 13th annual issue of Vartha Bharati at his office on 5 October 2015
- Karnataka Chief Minister Siddaramaiah released the 12th annual issue of Vartha Bharati at his office on 12 October 2014
- 10th anniversary special issue was released by Jnanpith laureate U. R. Ananthamurthy and the filmmaker Mahesh Bhatt in Mangalore during the Vartha Bharati reader's convention.
- 11th anniversary special issue was released by the Chief Minister of Karnataka Siddaramaiah, U. R. Ananthamurthy and the former Editor-in-Chief of The Hindu, N. Ram in Bangalore.

== Awards and accolades ==
- N. Ram, the former editor-in-chief of The Hindu, congratulated the daily for being a voice of the weaker section of the society for over a decade.
- Siddaramaiah commended Vartha Bharati for espousing the cause of all sections of society despite being a newspaper with a Muslim management.
- Mahesh Bhatt lauded Vartha Bharati by saying "Secularism is still alive in India, and we need to raise our voices against anti-secularists, just as Vartha Bharathi is doing. Vartha Bharathi has been doing what each Indian needs to do."
- Vartha Bharathi has been awarded by Karnataka chapter of the Transparency International India for its quality journalism.
- The book published by collecting the weekly column Bhoomi geete by the ecologist Dr. T.S. Vivekananda's won him the Karnataka Literature Academy Award for the year 2005.

== Annual special issues ==
Vartha Bharati brings out an annual special issue each year featuring contributions from prominent writers, journalists, academics and public figures. The publication includes articles, interviews, profiles, reviews, short stories and poems.

Contributors to the annual issue have included U. R. Ananthamurthy, Devanur Mahadeva, Chandrashekhara Kambara, Rahmat Tarikere, Banjagere Jayaprakash, S. G. Siddaramaiah, Jayant Kaikini, G. N. Mohan, Ravish Kumar, Karan Thapar, Siddharth Varadarajan, Rajdeep Sardesai, Akash Banerjee and Madhu Trehan, among others.

Articles published in these special issues have been part of discussions in Kannada literary and academic circles. Journalist Ravish Kumar has contributed articles to the annual issue on multiple occasions.

== Kalyana Karnataka edition ==
Vartha Bharati launched its Kalyana Karnataka edition in Kalaburagi on 20 December 2025 at Dr. S. M. Pandit Rangamandir. The launch marked the newspaper’s expansion into the Kalyana Karnataka region, adding to its existing print editions in Mangaluru, Bengaluru and Shivamogga.

The edition was launched by Siddharth Varadarajan, Editor-in-Chief of The Wire. The event was inaugurated by U. T. Khader, Speaker of the Karnataka Legislative Assembly. Prakash Raj released the newspaper’s 23rd annual special issue, while B. R. Patil, Deputy Chairman of the Karnataka State Policy and Planning Commission, released a compilation of editorials. Rahim Khan, Minister for Municipal Administration and Haj, released the special supplement of Kalyana Karnataka.

The new edition focuses on coverage of regional news and issues in districts such as Kalaburagi, Bidar, Yadgir, Raichur, Koppal and Vijayapura. The launch event was attended by political leaders, activists and members of civil society from across the region.

Speaking at the event, Siddharth Varadarajan, Prakash Raj and other dignitories lauded Vartha Bharati for its commitment to secularism and constitutional values and always being the voice of the voiceless sections of the society. They appreciated the role played by Vartha Bharati in Karnataka to fight misinformation and hate.

== Contributors and Editorial influence ==
The editorial and op-ed pages of Vartha Bharati are part of its opinion section, carrying articles, columns and interviews by writers, academicians, literary figures and activists. These contributions are widely read and discussed in Kannada literary, academic and intellectual circles and reflect a range of perspectives on social, political and cultural issues often neglected by mainstream media.

Prominent Kannada writer U. R. Ananthamurthy, in his book 'Maathu Sotha Bharatha', referred to the newspaper’s editorials as best in the context of Kannada journalism. Collections of Vartha Bharati editorials have also received the Karnataka Sahitya Akademi award for the year 2024.

Articles published in the newspaper engage with a range of public issues. Some of these writings have led to discussions in political and social spaces and have, at times, been referenced in the proceedings of the state Legislative Assembly and Council.

== Vartha Bharati's Profile featured in 'The Caravan' ==
Vartha Bharati was profiled in the December 2025 issue of 'The Caravan' magazine published by Delhi Press. The article discussed the newspaper’s establishment in 2003 and its positioning within Karnataka’s media landscape. It noted that the publication emerged in response to prevailing media trends and has focused on reporting that highlights a range of social perspectives, including those of marginalised communities.

The profile also referred to Vartha Bharati as an alternative newspaper and examined its approach to reporting, including its engagement with issues related to misinformation and public discourse.

== Digital reach and social media presence ==
Vartha Bharati, along with its print edition, operates across multiple digital and social media platforms. Its content is available through its e-paper, news websites, and platforms such as Facebook, Twitter, Instagram, YouTube, ShareChat, WhatsApp and Telegram, allowing readers and viewers to access its coverage from different parts of the world.

News updates, features and other content are shared regularly across these platforms, enabling timely dissemination of information and engagement with audiences.

The organisation has also developed a presence in multimedia formats. Its YouTube channel hosts a range of content including news reports, analysis, debates, discussions, interviews, ground reports and fact-check segments. The channel has recorded over 50 crore views and has more than 8 lakh subscribers.

The Kannada news portal of Vartha Bharati is among the platforms through which it reaches Kannada-speaking audiences, including readers outside India. Its Facebook page has over 1.1 million followers, while its Instagram account has more than 2.6 lakh followers.

In addition to its Kannada platforms, Vartha Bharati also operates an English-language news portal that carries news updates from India and other parts of the world.

== Apps and Websites ==
Website

Digital Channel

== See also ==
- Abdussalam Puthige
- Karnataka literature
- List of Kannada-language newspapers
- List of Kannada-language magazines
- List of newspapers in India
- Media in Karnataka
- Media of India
