= Ahmed Javed (scholar) =

Pakistani Islamic theologian, philosopher and poet

Ahmed Javaid
- احمد جاوید
- Born: November 18, 1954 (age 71); Saiyed Sarawan, Allahabad, Uttar Pradesh, India
- Occupations: Islamic theologian; philosopher; poet; scholar
- Years active: 1986–present
- Organization: Iqbal Academy Pakistan

Ahmed Javaid (born 18 November 1954) is a Pakistani Islamic theologian, philosopher, literary critic, and poet. He is known for his lectures and writings on Islamic philosophy, Persian and Urdu literature, Sufism, and metaphysics. He is a former director of the Iqbal Academy Pakistan.

== Early life and education ==
Ahmed Javaid was born on 18 November 1954 in Saiyed Sarawan, Allahabad, Uttar Pradesh, India. Following the partition-era migrations, his family moved to Pakistan in 1958 and settled in Karachi.

Javaid developed an early interest in literature, philosophy, and Islamic intellectual traditions. His studies included classical Persian literature, Urdu poetry, Islamic theology, and philosophy. His intellectual interests were influenced by the works of Muslim philosophers and mystics including Avicenna, Mulla Sadra, and Ibn Arabi.

== Career ==
In 1986, Javaid moved to Lahore and joined the Iqbal Academy Pakistan as a researcher. During his association with the institution, he worked on projects related to the thought of Muhammad Iqbal, Islamic civilization, and classical literature. He later served as the director of the academy from 2014 to 2015.

Javaid is widely known for his public lectures on religion, philosophy, literature, and spirituality. His lectures frequently examine the intellectual and poetic traditions of Persian and Urdu literature, particularly the works of Rumi, Saadi Shirazi, Mir Taqi Mir, Ghalib, and Muhammad Iqbal.

He regularly delivers weekly lectures on religious thought, philosophy, spirituality, and ethics in Lahore and Karachi. His lectures focus on Islamic intellectual traditions, moral philosophy, human values, and the spiritual dimensions of religion.

Javaid has developed a substantial audience among students, scholars, and intellectual circles in Pakistan. Recordings of his lectures are widely circulated on digital platforms, particularly YouTube, where they are viewed by audiences interested in religion, literature, philosophy, and metaphysics. In addition to online lectures, he also conducts in-person study sessions and classes on Islamic thought and philosophy.

== Thought and philosophy ==
Javaid's intellectual work focuses on Islamic metaphysics, ethics, aesthetics, and Sufi thought. He has discussed the philosophical traditions associated with wahdat al-wujud and classical Islamic metaphysics in numerous lectures and seminars.

In philosophy, he has acknowledged the influence of thinkers such as Avicenna and Mulla Sadra.

Javaid has also commented extensively on literary modernism, symbolism, language, and the relationship between spirituality and literature. His interpretive style combines literary criticism with philosophical and theological analysis.

== Selected works ==
- Chirya Ghar
- Taqreeban
- Islahi Batein
- Munajat
- Unsymbolic Story
- Tark-e-Razaiyel
- Wahdat-ul-Wujood
- Tehzeeb-i-Sukhan
- Iblees Ka Kitaab
