= Shikwa and Jawab-e-Shikwa =

Two Poems by Muhammad Iqbal (1909-1913)

"Jawab-e-Shikwa"
Audio 13 min 46 s, by Jamal Nasir

"Shikwa" (Urdu: شکوہ, "Complaint") and "Jawab-e-Shikwa" (Urdu: جوابِ شکوہ, "Response to the Complaint") are poems written by Muhammad Iqbal, in the Urdu language, which were later published in his book Bang-e-Dara. The poems are often noted for their musicality, poetical beauty and depth of thought.

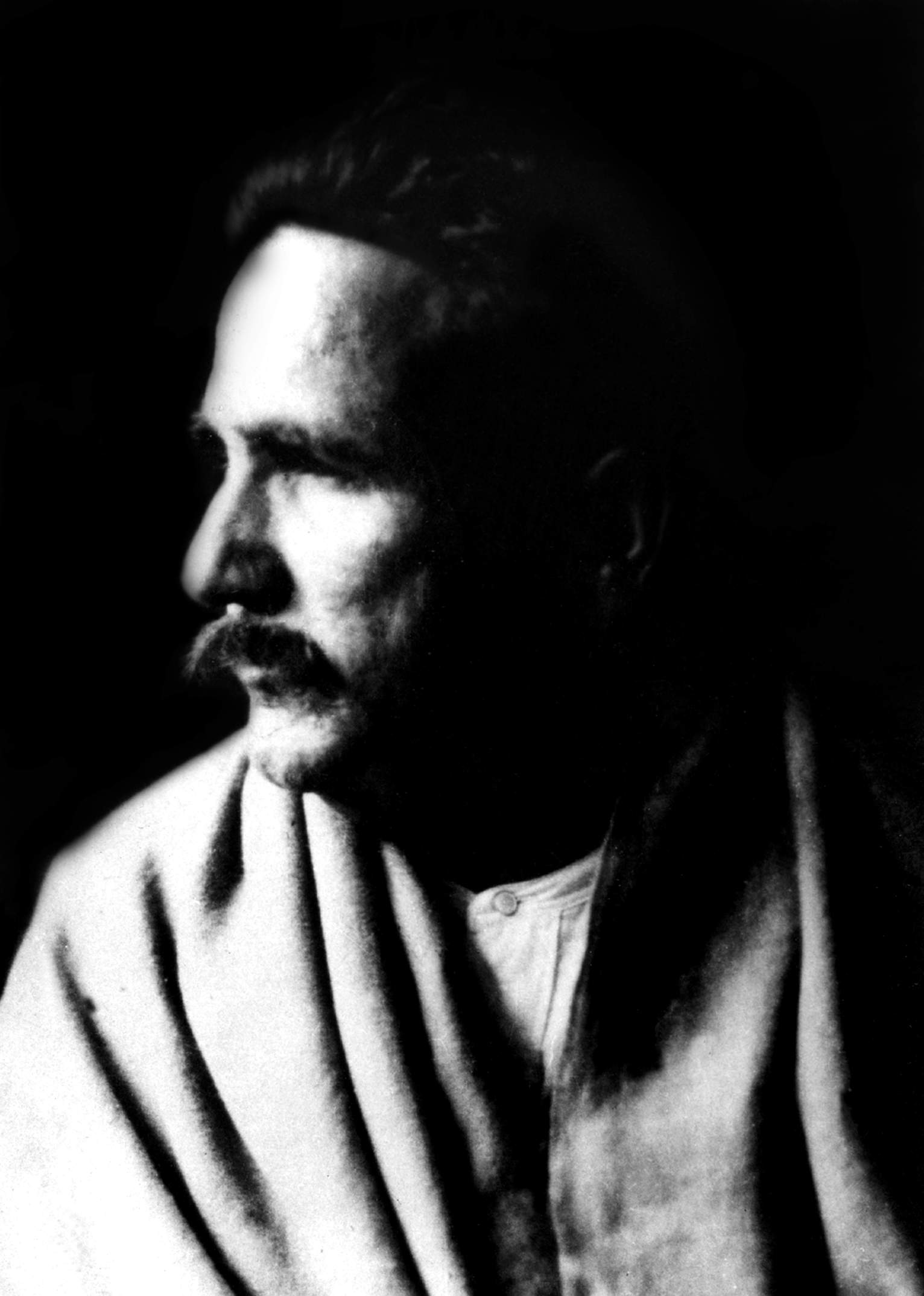
Allama Muhammad Iqbal

== Overview ==
Though much of his poetry is written in Persian, Muhammad Iqbal was also a poet of stature in Urdu. Shikwa, published in 1909, and Jawab-e-Shikwa, published in 1913, extol the legacy of Islam and its civilizing role in history, bemoan the fate of Muslims everywhere, and squarely confront the dilemmas of Islam in modern times. Shikwa is in the form of a complaint to Allah for having let down Muslims and Jawab-e-Shikwa is in the form of God's reply.

The central idea of the poem Shikwa is that God is not fulfilling his promise to protect followers of the Prophet from loss and a decline in fortune. In Jawab-e Shikwa God answers directly that he has not broken his promise; instead it is the Muslims, his followers, who have turned away from the Path.

== Controversies over Shikwa ==
The reason why Shikwa raised controversies is that the main theme of the poem was the 'Complaint to God' for Muslims' downfall, ill-treatment and troubles they were facing. When the first of these poems, Shikwa, was published it created confusion among Muslim scholars who thought that Iqbal was being ungrateful for the blessings of God. "When Iqbal wrote Shikwa, orthodox religious clerics called him an infidel, and in all honesty, Shikwa does emanate a very strong sense of entitlement". The second poem, Jawab-e-Shikwa, was not announced with the publication of the first, but when it was published four years later Iqbal was praised for his contribution to Urdu poetry and Islamic literature.

== Publication ==
Iqbal recited Shikwa for the first time in April 1909, at a poetry gathering organized by Anjuman-i-Himayat-i-Islam in Lahore. In 1913 Iqbal recited its sequel Javab-e-Shikwa at a political rally held outside Mochi Gate, Lahore to raise money for the Turkish struggle against a Bulgarian uprising, a prefiguring of the Khilafat Movement.

== Composition ==
Javab e Shikwa

dil se jo baat nikaltī hai asar rakhtī hai
par nahīñ tāqat-e-parvāz magar rakhtī hai
qudsi-ul-asl hai rif.at pe nazar rakhtī hai
ḳhaak se uThtī hai gardūñ pe guzar rakhtī hai
ishq thā fitnagar o sarkash o chālāk mirā
āsmāñ chiir gayā nāla-e-bebāk mirā

pīr-e-gardūñ ne kahā sun ke kahīñ hai koī
bole sayyāre sar-e-arsh-e-barīñ hai koī
chāñd kahtā thā nahīñ ahl-e-zamīñ hai koī
kahkashāñ kahtī thī poshīda yahīñ hai koī
kuchh jo samjhā mire shikve ko to rizvāñ samjhā
mujh ko jannat se nikālā huā insāñ samjhā

thī farishtoñ ko bhī hairat ki ye āvāz hai kyā
arsh vāloñ pe bhī khultā nahīñ ye raaz hai kyā
tā-sar-e-arsh bhī insāñ kī tag-o-tāz hai kyā
aa ga.ī ḳhaak kī chuTkī ko bhī parvāz hai kyā
ġhāfil ādāb se sukkān-e-zamīñ kaise haiñ
shoḳh o gustāḳh ye pastī ke makīñ kaise haiñ

is qadar shoḳh ki allāh se bhī barham hai
thā jo masjūd-e-malā.ik ye vahī aadam hai
ālim-e-kaif hai dānā-e-rumūz-e-kam hai
haañ magar ijz ke asrār se nā-mahram hai
naaz hai tāqat-e-guftār pe insānoñ ko
baat karne kā salīqa nahīñ nā-dānoñ ko

aa.ī āvāz ġham-añgez hai afsāna tirā
ashk-e-betāb se labrez hai paimāna tirā
āsmāñ-gīr huā nāra-e-mastāna tirā
kis qadar shoḳh-zabāñ hai dil-e-dīvāna tirā
shukr shikve ko kiyā husn-e-adā se tū ne
ham-suḳhan kar diyā bandoñ ko ḳhudā se tū ne

ham to mā.il-ba-karam haiñ koī saa.il hī nahīñ
raah dikhlā.eñ kise rah-rav-e-manzil hī nahīñ
tarbiyat aam to hai jauhar-e-qābil hī nahīñ
jis se ta.amīr ho aadam kī ye vo gil hī nahīñ
koī qābil ho to ham shān-e-ka.ī dete haiñ
DhūñDne vāloñ ko duniyā bhī na.ī dete haiñ

haath be-zor haiñ ilhād se dil ḳhūgar haiñ
ummatī bā.is-e-rusvā.i-e-paiġhambar haiñ
but-shikan uTh ga.e baaqī jo rahe but-gar haiñ
thā brāhīm pidar aur pisar aazar haiñ
bāda-āshām na.e baada nayā ḳhum bhī na.e
haram-e-kāba nayā but bhī na.e tum bhī na.e

vo bhī din the ki yahī māya-e-rānā.ī thā
nāzish-e-mausam-e-gul lāla-e-sahrā.ī thā
jo musalmān thā allāh kā saudā.ī thā
kabhī mahbūb tumhārā yahī harjā.ī thā
kisī yakjā.ī se ab ahd-e-ġhulāmī kar lo
millat-e-ahmad-e-mursil ko maqāmī kar lo

kis qadar tum pe girāñ sub.h kī bedārī hai
ham se kab pyaar hai haañ niiñd tumheñ pyārī hai
tab-e-āzād pe qaid-e-ramazāñ bhārī hai
tumhīñ kah do yahī ā.īn-e-vafādārī hai
qaum maz.hab se hai maz.hab jo nahīñ tum bhī nahīñ
jazb-e-bāham jo nahīñ mahfil-e-anjum bhī nahīñ

jin ko aatā nahīñ duniyā meñ koī fan tum ho
nahīñ jis qaum ko parvā-e-nasheman tum ho
bijliyāñ jis meñ hoñ āsūda vo ḳhirman tum ho
bech khāte haiñ jo aslāf ke madfan tum ho
ho niko naam jo qabroñ kī tijārat kar ke
kyā na bechoge jo mil jaa.eñ sanam patthar ke

safha-e-dahr se bātil ko miTāyā kis ne
nau-e-insāñ ko ġhulāmī se chhuḌāyā kis ne
mere ka.abe ko jabīnoñ se basāyā kis ne
mere qur.ān ko sīnoñ se lagāyā kis ne
the to aabā vo tumhāre hī magar tum kyā ho
haath par haath dhare muntazir-e-fardā ho

kyā kahā bahr-e-musalmāñ hai faqat vāda-e-hūr
shikva bejā bhī kare koī to lāzim hai shu.ūr
adl hai fātir-e-hastī kā azal se dastūr
muslim aa.iiñ huā kāfir to mile huur o qusūr
tum meñ hūroñ kā koī chāhne vaalā hī nahīñ
jalva-e-tūr to maujūd hai muusā hī nahīñ

manfa.at ek hai is qaum kā nuqsān bhī ek
ek hī sab kā nabī diin bhī īmān bhī ek
haram-e-pāk bhī allāh bhī qur.ān bhī ek
kuchh baḌī baat thī hote jo musalmān bhī ek
firqa-bandī hai kahīñ aur kahīñ zāteñ haiñ
kyā zamāne meñ panapne kī yahī bāteñ haiñ

kaun hai tārik-e-ā.īn-e-rasūl-e-muḳhtār
maslahat vaqt kī hai kis ke amal kā me.aar
kis kī āñkhoñ meñ samāyā hai shi.ār-e-aġhyār
ho ga.ī kis kī nigah tarz-e-salaf se be-zār
qalb meñ soz nahīñ ruuh meñ ehsās nahīñ
kuchh bhī paiġhām-e-mohammad kā tumheñ paas nahīñ

jā ke hote haiñ masājid meñ saf-ārā to ġharīb
zahmat-e-roza jo karte haiñ gavārā to ġharīb
naam letā hai agar koī hamārā to ġharīb
parda rakhtā hai agar koī tumhārā to ġharīb
umarā nashsha-e-daulat meñ haiñ ġhāfil ham se
zinda hai millat-e-baizā ġhorabā ke dam se

vā.iz-e-qaum kī vo puḳhta-ḳhayālī na rahī
barq-e-tab.ī na rahī shola-maqālī na rahī
rah ga.ī rasm-e-azāñ rūh-e-bilālī na rahī
falsafa rah gayā talqīn-e-ġhazālī na rahī
masjideñ marsiyāñ-ḳhvāñ haiñ ki namāzī na rahe
yaanī vo sahib-e-ausāf-e-hijāzī na rahe

shor hai ho ga.e duniyā se musalmāñ nābūd
ham ye kahte haiñ ki the bhī kahīñ muslim maujūd
vaz.a meñ tum ho nasārā to tamaddun meñ hunūd
ye musalmāñ haiñ jinheñ dekh ke sharmā.eñ yahūd
yuuñ to sayyad bhī ho mirzā bhī ho afġhān bhī ho
tum sabhī kuchh ho batāo to musalmān bhī ho

dam-e-taqrīr thī muslim kī sadāqat bebāk
adl us kā thā qavī laus-e-marā.āt se paak
shajar-e-fitrat-e-muslim thā hayā se namnāk
thā shujā.at meñ vo ik hasti-e-fauq-ul-idrāk
ḳhud-gudāzī nam-e-kaifiyat-e-sahbā-yash buud
ḳhālī-az-ḳhesh shudan sūrat-e-mīnā-yash buud

har musalmāñ rag-e-bātil ke liye nashtar thā
us ke ā.īna-e-hastī meñ amal jauhar thā
jo bharosā thā use quvvat-e-bāzū par thā
hai tumheñ maut kā Dar us ko ḳhudā kā Dar thā
baap kā ilm na beTe ko agar azbar ho
phir pisar qābil-e-mīrās-e-pidar kyūñkar ho

har koī mast-e-mai-e-zauq-e-tan-āsānī hai
tum musalmāñ ho ye andāz-e-musalmānī hai
haidarī faqr hai ne daulat-e-usmānī hai
tum ko aslāf se kyā nisbat-e-rūhānī hai
vo zamāne meñ muazziz the musalmāñ ho kar
aur tum ḳhvār hue tārik-e-qur.āñ ho kar

tum ho aapas meñ ġhazabnāk vo aapas meñ rahīm
tum ḳhatā-kār o ḳhatā-bīñ vo ḳhatā-posh o karīm
chāhte sab haiñ ki hoñ auj-e-surayyā pe muqīm
pahle vaisā koī paidā to kare qalb-e-salīm
taḳht-e-faġhfūr bhī un kā thā sarīr-e-ka.e bhī
yuuñ hī bāteñ haiñ ki tum meñ vo hamiyat hai bhī

ḳhud-kushī sheva tumhārā vo ġhayūr o ḳhuddār
tum uḳhuvvat se gurezāñ vo uḳhuvvat pe nisār
tum ho guftār sarāpā vo sarāpā kirdār
tum taraste ho kalī ko vo gulistāñ ba-kanār
ab talak yaad hai qaumoñ ko hikāyat un kī
naqsh hai safha-e-hastī pe sadāqat un kī

misl-e-anjum ufuq-e-qaum pe raushan bhī hue
but-e-hindī kī mohabbat meñ birhman bhī hue
shauq-e-parvāz meñ mahjūr-e-nasheman bhī hue
be-amal the hī javāñ diin se bad-zan bhī hue
in ko tahzīb ne har band se āzād kiyā
lā ke ka.abe se sanam-ḳhāne meñ ābād kiyā

qais zahmat-kash-e-tanhā.i-e-sahrā na rahe
shahr kī khaa.e havā bādiya-paimā na rahe
vo to dīvāna hai bastī meñ rahe yā na rahe
ye zarūrī hai hijāb-e-ruḳh-e-lailā na rahe
gila-e-zaur na ho shikva-e-bedād na ho
ishq āzād hai kyuuñ husn bhī āzād na ho

ahd-e-nau barq hai ātish-zan-e-har-ḳhirman hai
aiman is se koī sahrā na koī gulshan hai
is na.ī aag kā aqvām-e-kuhan īñdhan hai
millat-e-ḳhatm-e-rusul shola-ba-pairāhan hai
aaj bhī ho jo brāhīm kā īmāñ paidā
aag kar saktī hai andāz-e-gulistāñ paidā

dekh kar rañg-e-chaman ho na pareshāñ maalī
Kaukab-e-ġhuncha se shāḳheñ haiñ chamakne vaalī
ḳhas o ḳhāshāk se hotā hai gulistāñ ḳhālī
ġhul-bar-andāz hai ḳhūn-e-shohdā kī laalī
rañg gardūñ kā zarā dekh to unnābī hai
ye nikalte hue sūraj kī ufuq-tābī hai

ummateñ gulshan-e-hastī meñ samar-chīda bhī haiñ
aur mahrūm-e-samar bhī haiñ ḳhizāñ-dīda bhī haiñ
saikḌoñ naḳhl haiñ kāhīda bhī bālīda bhī haiñ
saikḌoñ batn-e-chaman meñ abhī poshīda bhī haiñ
naḳhl-e-islām namūna hai birau-mandī kā
phal hai ye saikḌoñ sadiyoñ kī chaman-bandī kā

paak hai gard-e-vatan se sar-e-dāmāñ terā
tū vo yūsuf hai ki har misr hai kan.āñ terā
qāfila ho na sakegā kabhī vīrāñ terā
ġhair yak-bāñg-e-darā kuchh nahīñ sāmāñ terā
naḳhl-e-shama astī o dar shola do-resha-e-tū
āqibat-soz bavad sāya-e-andesha-e-tū

tū na miT jā.egā īrān ke miT jaane se
nashsha-e-mai ko ta.alluq nahīñ paimāne se
hai ayaañ yurish-e-tātār ke afsāne se
pāsbāñ mil ga.e ka.abe ko sanam-ḳhāne se
kashti-e-haq kā zamāne meñ sahārā tū hai
asr-e-nau-rāt hai dhundlā sā sitārā tū hai

hai jo hañgāma bapā yurish-e-bulġhārī kā
ġhāfiloñ ke liye paiġhām hai bedārī kā
tū samajhtā hai ye sāmāñ hai dil-āzārī kā
imtihāñ hai tire īsār kā ḳhuddārī kā
kyuuñ hirāsāñ hai sahīl-e-faras-e-ādā se
nūr-e-haq bujh na sakegā nafas-e-ādā se

chashm-e-aqvām se maḳhfī hai haqīqat terī
hai abhī mahfil-e-hastī ko zarūrat terī
zinda rakhtī hai zamāne ko harārat terī
kaukab-e-qismat-e-imkāñ hai ḳhilāfat terī
vaqt-e-fursat hai kahāñ kaam abhī baaqī hai
nūr-e-tauhīd kā itmām abhī baaqī hai

misl-e-bū qaid hai ġhunche meñ pareshāñ ho jā
raḳht-bar-dosh havā-e-chamanistāñ ho jā
hai tunak-māya tū zarre se bayābāñ ho jā
naġhma-e-mauj hai hañgāma-e-tūfāñ ho jā
quvvat-e-ishq se har past ko baalā kar de
dahr meñ ism-e-mohammad se ujālā kar de

ho na ye phuul to bulbul kā tarannum bhī na ho
chaman-e-dahr meñ kaliyoñ kā tabassum bhī na ho
ye na saaqī ho to phir mai bhī na ho ḳhum bhī na ho
bazm-e-tauhīd bhī duniyā meñ na ho tum bhī na ho
ḳhema-e-aflāk kā istāda isī naam se hai
nabz-e-hastī tapish-āmāda isī naam se hai

dasht meñ dāman-e-kohsār meñ maidān meñ hai
bahr meñ mauj kī āġhosh meñ tūfān meñ hai
chiin ke shahr marāqash ke bayābān meñ hai
aur poshīda musalmān ke īmān meñ hai
chashm-e-aqvām ye nazzāra abad tak dekhe
rif.at-e-shān-e-rafānā-lakā-zikrak dekhe

mardum-e-chashm-e-zamīñ yaanī vo kaalī duniyā
vo tumhāre shohdā pālne vaalī duniyā
garmi-e-mehr kī parvarda hilālī duniyā
ishq vaale jise kahte haiñ bilālī duniyā
tapish-andoz hai is naam se paare kī tarah
ġhota-zan nuur meñ hai aañkh ke taare kī tarah

aql hai terī sipar ishq hai shamshīr tirī
mire darvesh ḳhilāfat hai jahāñgīr tirī
mā-sivā-allāh ke liye aag hai takbīr tirī
tū musalmāñ ho to taqdīr hai tadbīr tirī
kī mohammad se vafā tū ne to ham tere haiñ
ye jahāñ chiiz hai kyā lauh-o-qalam tere haiñ

— Muhammad Iqbal

Iqbal composed both the poems in the Arabic metre ramal. Shikwa is made of 31 stanzas of six lines each, while Javab-e-Shikwa is made of 36 stanzas of the same length. The first four hemistichs (misra) have the same rhyme and the last two a different one; i.e. the rhyme scheme is AAAABB. In the whole work four verses are in Persian.

Syllabic structure of a verse
Stress	–	u	–	–	u	u	–	–	u	u	–	–	–	–
Syllable	dil	se	jo	baa	t	ni	kal	ti	hai	a	sar	rakh	ti	hai

In this metre, the next-to-last long syllable can be replaced at will by two short syllables; i.e., in the first verse of Shikwa, Iqbal replaced next-to-last long syllables by two short syllables:

Stress	–	u	–	–	u	u	–	–	u	u	–	–	u	u	–
Syllable	kyun	zi	yaan	kaa	r	ba	nu	soo	d	fa	raa	mo	sh	ra	hu

== Translations ==
The available translations of both poems are:

- The Complaint And The Answer (1943) by Altaf Husain
- Complaint And Answer (1955) by A. J. Arberry
- Shikwa And Jawab-e-Shikwa by Nawab Mahmood Ali Khan Tyro
- Complaint And Answer (1981) by Khushwant Singh
- Allama Muhammad Iqbal's Expostulation With The Almighty And Almighty's Censure (1977) by Suleman Zubair
- Representation And Reply (1998) by Raja Sultan Zahur Akhtar
- Shikwa & Jawab Shikwa: The Complaint and the Answer: The Human Grievance and the Divine Response (2015) by Abdussalam Puthige

== Legacy ==
Both poems were sung by the Sabri Brothers, Nusrat Fateh Ali Khan and the late Aziz Mian.

Both poems were recited together in Coke Studio Season 11. Shikwa was sung by Natasha Baig, while Fareed Ayaz, Abu Muhammad Qawwal & Brothers sang Jawab-e-Shikwa .

== See also ==
- Index of Muhammad Iqbal–related articles
- Urdu poetry
