= Khizr-i-Rah =

Khizr-e-Rah
- by Muhammad Iqbal
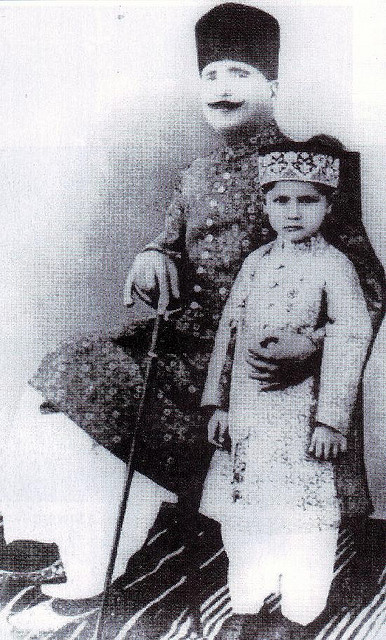
- Iqbal and his son Javid Iqbal in 1930
- Original title: خضرِ راہ
- Written: 1922
- First published in: The Call of the Marching Bell
- Country: British Raj
- Language: Urdu
- Publication date: 1924

The "Khizr-i-Rah" ("The Guide of the Path") is a poem in Urdu written in 1922 by Sir Muhammad Iqbal and published in his 1924 collection Bang-i-dara. It deals with the subject of the political future of Muslims. The poem is an imaginary conversation between Iqbal and Khizr (The Guide). Iqbal, while sitting alone one night, sees Khizr appear before him who inquires about the cause of his restlessness. Iqbal tells him about many things he has failed to understand in life and Khizr explains to him the secrets of those things. The three main topics of the conversation were "the secret of life", "the governments" and the "downfall of Muslims".

== See also ==
- Index of Muhammad Iqbal–related articles
