= Sare Jahan se Accha =

Patriotic Urdu poem

- by Muhammad Iqbal
- Original title: Taranah-e-Hindi
- First published in: Ittehad
- Country: British Raj
- Language: Urdu
- Form: Ghazal
- Publication date: 16 August 1904

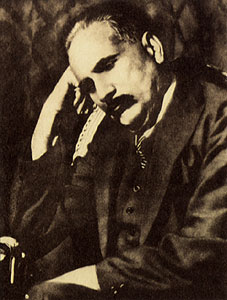
Muhammad Iqbal, then president of the Muslim League in 1930 and address deliverer

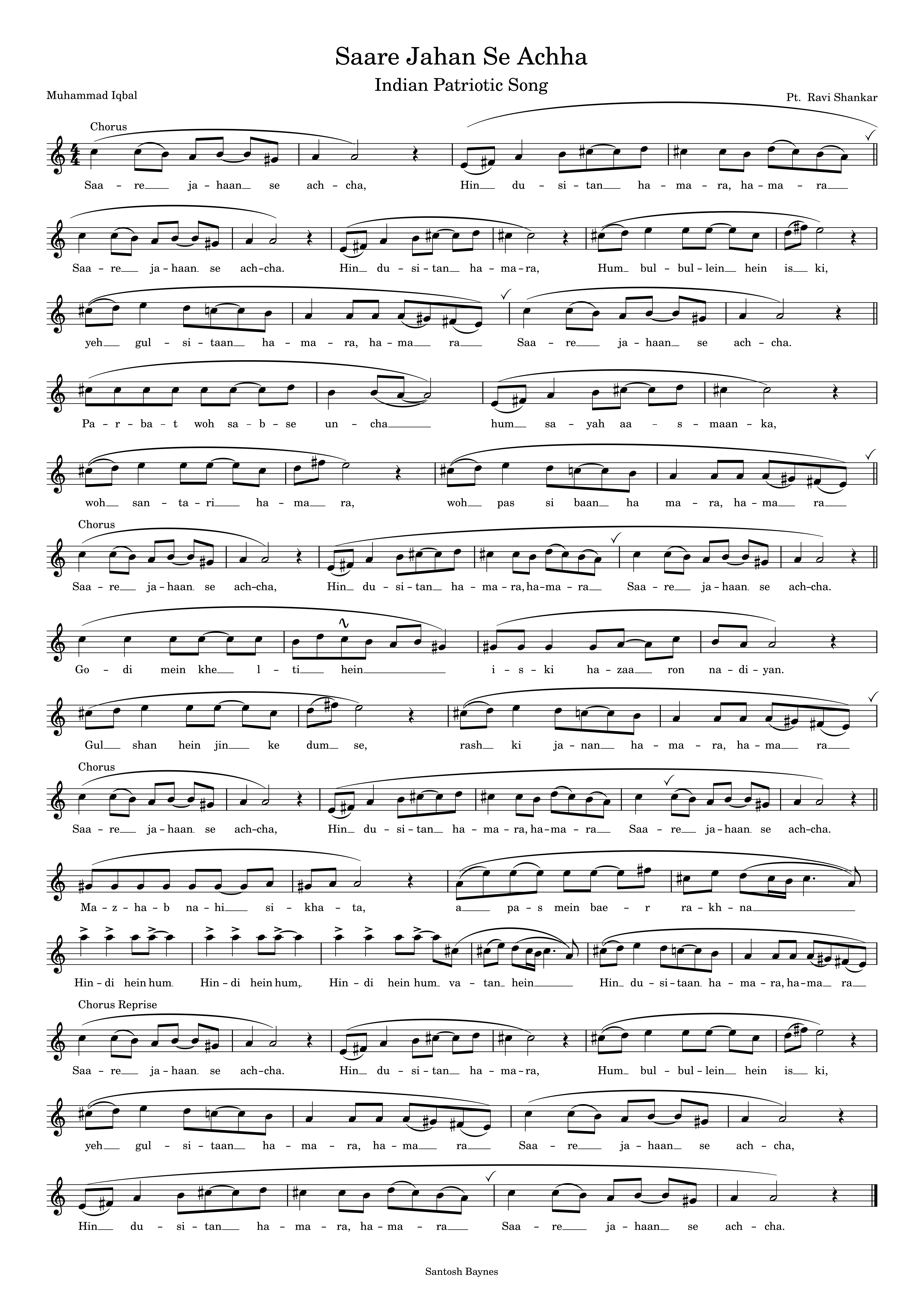

"Sare Jahan se Accha" (Urdu: سارے جہاں سے اچھا; Sāre Jahāṉ se Acchā), formally known as "Tarānah-e-Hindi" (Urdu: ترانۂ ہندی, "Anthem of the People of Hindustan"), is an Urdu language patriotic song for children written by poet Allama Muhammad Iqbal in the ghazal style of Urdu poetry. (Note: "'Taranah-e Hindi' (1904) was explicitly written as a patriotic song for children; Iqbal also composed a number of others meant for children, but this one has always been the most popular. This little ghazal ...") The poem was published in the weekly journal Ittehad on 16 August 1904. Publicly recited by Iqbal the following year at Government College, Lahore, British India (now in Pakistan) it quickly became an anthem of opposition to the British Raj. The song, an ode to Hindustan—the land comprising present-day Bangladesh, India and Pakistan, was later published in 1924 in the Urdu book Bang-i-Dara.

By 1910, Iqbal's worldview had changed to become global and Islamic. In a new song for children, "Tarana-e-Milli," written in the same metre, he changed the homeland from "Hindustan" to the "whole world." In 1930, in his presidential address to the Muslim League annual conference in Allahabad, he supported a separate nation-state in the Muslim-majority areas of the subcontinent, an idea that inspired the creation of Pakistan.

Saare Jahan se Accha has remained popular, but only in India. (Note: This little ghazal, composed by the man widely considered to be the philosophical father of Pakistan, is now extremely popular—but only in India.") An abridged version is sung and played there as a patriotic song and as a marching song of the Indian Armed Forces. The most popular musical composition is that of sitar maestro Ravi Shankar.

== Text of poem ==
Urdu

سارے جہاں سے اچھا ہندوستاں ہمارا
ہم بلبلیں ہیں اس کی، یہ گلستاں ہمارا

غربت میں ہوں اگر ہم، رہتا ہے دل وطن میں
سمجھو وہیں ہمیں بھی دل ہو جہاں ہمارا

پربت وہ سب سے اونچا، ہمسایہ آسماں کا
وہ سنتری ہمارا، وہ پاسباں ہمارا

گودی میں کھیلتی ہیں اس کی ہزاروں ندیاں
گلشن ہے جن کے دم سے رشکِ جناں ہمارا

اے آبِ رودِ گنگا! وہ دن ہیں یاد تجھ کو؟
اترا ترے کنارے جب کارواں ہمارا

مذہب نہیں سکھاتا آپس میں بیر رکھنا
ہندی ہیں ہم، وطن ہے ہندوستاں ہمارا

یونان و مصر و روما سب مٹ گئے جہاں سے
اب تک مگر ہے باقی نام و نشاں ہمارا

کچھ بات ہے کہ ہستی مٹتی نہیں ہماری
صدیوں رہا ہے دشمن دورِ زماں ہمارا

اقبال! کوئی محرم اپنا نہيں جہاں میں
معلوم کیا کسی کو دردِ نہاں ہمارا!

Romanisation (ALA-LC)

Sāre jahāṉ se acchā, Hindositāṉ hamārā
Ham bulbuleṉ haiṉ is kī, yih gulsitāṉ hamārā

G̱ẖurbat meṉ hoṉ agar ham, rahtā hai dil wat̤an meṉ
Samjho wuhīṉ hameṉ bhī dil ho jahāṉ hamārā

Parbat wuh sab se ūṉchā, hamsāyah āsmāṉ kā
Wuh santarī hamārā, wuh pāsbāṉ hamārā

Godī meṉ kheltī haiṉ is kī hazāroṉ nadiyāṉ
Guls̱ẖan hai jin ke dam se ras̱ẖk-i janāṉ hamārā

Ai āb-i rūd-i Gangā! wuh din haiṉ yād tujh ko?
Utrā tire kināre jab kārwāṉ hamārā

Maẕhab nahīṉ sikhātā āpas meṉ bair rakhnā
Hindī haiṉ ham, wat̤an hai Hindositāṉ hamārā

Yūnān o-Miṣr o-Rūmā, sab miṭ ga'e jahāṉ se
Ab tak magar hai bāqī, nām o-nis̱ẖaṉ hamārā

Kuch bāt hai kih hastī, miṭtī nahīṉ hamārī
Ṣadiyoṉ rahā hai dus̱ẖman daur-i zamāṉ hamārā

Iqbāl! ko'ī maḥram apnā nahīṉ jahāṉ meṉ
Maʿlūm kyā kisī ko dard-i nihāṉ hamārā!

== English translation ==
Better than the entire world, is our Hindustan,
We are its nightingales, and it (is) our garden abode.

If we are in an alien place, the heart remains in the homeland,
consider us too [to be] right there where our heart would be.

That tallest mountain, that shade-sharer of the sky,
It (is) our sentry, it (is) our watchman

In its lap where frolic thousands of the rivers,
Whose vitality makes our garden the envy of Paradise.

O the flowing waters of the Ganges, do you remember that day
When our caravan first disembarked on your waterfront?

Religion does not teach us to bear animosity among ourselves
We are of Hind, our homeland is India.

In a world in which ancient Greece, Egypt, and Rome have all vanished
Our own attributes (name and sign) live on today.

There is something about our existence for it doesn't get wiped
Even though, for centuries, the time-cycle of the world has been our enemy.

Iqbal! We have no confidant in this world
What does any one know of our hidden pain?

== Composition ==
Iqbal was a lecturer at the Government College, Lahore at that time, and was invited by a student Lala Har Dayal to preside over a function. Instead of delivering a speech, Iqbal sang "Saare Jahan Se Achcha". The song, in addition to embodying yearning and attachment to the land of Hindustan, expressed "cultural memory" and had an elegiac quality. In 1905, the 27-year-old Iqbal viewed the future society of the subcontinent as both a pluralistic and composite Hindu-Muslim culture. Later that year he left for Europe for a three-year sojourn that was to transform him into an Islamic philosopher and a visionary of a future Islamic society.

== Iqbal's transformation and Tarana-e-Milli ==
In 1910, Iqbal wrote another song for children, "Tarana-e-Milli" (Anthem of the Religious Community), which was composed in the same metre and rhyme scheme as "Saare Jahan Se Achcha", but which renounced much of the sentiment of the earlier song. The sixth stanza of "Saare Jahan Se Achcha" (1904), which is often quoted as proof of Iqbal's secular outlook:

Maẕhab nahīṉ sikhātā āpas meṉ bair rakhnā
Hindī haiṉ ham, wat̤an hai Hindūstāṉ hamārā

Translation:

Religion does not teach us to bear ill-will among ourselves
We are of Hind, our homeland is Hindustan.

contrasted significantly with the first stanza of Tarana-e-Milli (1910) reads:

Chīn o-ʿArab hamārā, Hindūstāṉ hamārā
Muslim haiṉ ham, wat̤an hai sārā jahāṉ hamārā

Translation:

Central Asia and Arabia are ours, Hindustan is ours
We are Muslims, the whole world is our homeland.

Iqbal's world view had now changed; it had become both global and Islamic. Instead of singing of Hindustan, "our homeland," the new song proclaimed that "our homeland is the whole world." Two decades later, in his presidential address to the Muslim League annual conference in Allahabad in 1930, he supported a separate nation-state in the Muslim majority areas of the sub-continent, an idea that inspired the creation of Pakistan.

== Popularity in India ==
- Saare Jahan Se Achcha has remained popular in India for nearly a century. Mahatma Gandhi is said to have sung it over a hundred times when he was imprisoned at Yerawada Jail in Pune in the 1930s.
- In the 1930s and 1940s, it was sung to a slower tune. In 1945, while working in Mumbai with the Indian People's Theatre Association (IPTA), the sitarist Pandit Ravi Shankar was asked to compose the music for the K. A. Abbas film Dharti Ke Lal and the Chetan Anand movie Neecha Nagar. During this time, Ravi Shankar was asked to compose music for the song "Saare Jahan se Accha". In an interview in 2009 with Shekhar Gupta, Ravi Shankar recounts that he felt that the existing tune was too slow and sad. To give it a more inspiring impact, he set it to a stronger tune which is today the popular tune of this song, which they then tried out as a group song. It was later recorded by the singer Lata Mangeshkar to a 3rd altogether different tune. Stanzas (1), (3), (4), and (6) of the song became an unofficial national song in India, and the Ravi Shankar version was adopted as the official quick march of the Indian Armed Forces. This arrangement as marching tune of this song was made by Antsher Lobo.
- Rakesh Sharma, the first Indian astronaut, employed the first line of the song in 1984 to describe to then prime minister Indira Gandhi how India appeared from outer space.
- In his inaugural speech, the former prime minister of India Manmohan Singh quoted this poem at his first press conference after becoming the Prime Minister.
- The song is popular in India in schools as a patriotic song, sung during morning assemblies, and as a marching song for the Indian armed forces, played during public events and parades. It is played by the Armed forces Massed Bands each year for the Indian Independence Day, Republic Day and at the culmination of Beating the Retreat.

=== Text in the Devanagari script ===
In India, the text of the poem is often rendered in the Devanagari script of Hindi:

Devanagari

सारे जहाँ से अच्छा हिन्दोसिताँ हमारा
हम बुलबुलें हैं इसकी यह गुलसिताँ हमारा

ग़ुर्बत में हों अगर हम, रहता है दिल वतन में
समझो वहीं हमें भी दिल हो जहाँ हमारा

परबत वह सबसे ऊँचा, हम्साया आसमाँ का
वह संतरी हमारा, वह पासबाँ हमारा

गोदी में खेलती हैं इसकी हज़ारों नदियाँ
गुल्शन है जिनके दम से रश्क-ए-जनाँ हमारा

ऐ आब-ए-रूद-ए-गंगा! वह दिन हैं याद तुझको?
उतरा तिरे किनारे जब कारवाँ हमारा

मज़्हब नहीं सिखाता आपस में बैर रखना
हिंदी हैं हम, वतन है हिन्दोसिताँ हमारा

यूनान-ओ-मिस्र-ओ-रूमा सब मिट गए जहाँ से
अब तक मगर है बाक़ी नाम-ओ-निशाँ हमारा

कुछ बात है कि हस्ती मिटती नहीं हमारी
सदियों रहा है दुश्मन दौर-ए-ज़माँ हमारा

इक़्बाल! कोई महरम अपना नहीं जहाँ में
मालूम क्या किसी को दर्द-ए-निहाँ हमारा !

== See also ==
- Index of Muhammad Iqbal–related articles
- Iqbal bibliography
- Amar Shonar Bangla
- Jana Gana Mana
- Vande Mataram
- National Pledge (India)
