= Iqbal Review =

Academic journal

Iqbal Review (Punjabi, Urdu: اقبال ریویو; ISSN 0021-0773), is a bilingual academic journal dedicated to the memory of the Islamic philosopher-poet Muhammad Iqbal. It is published by the Iqbal Academy (Pakistan).

== Overview ==
The journal covers research on the life, poetry and thought of Allama Muhammad Iqbal and on the branches of knowledge he was interested in: Islamic studies, philosophy, history, sociology, comparative religion, literature, art, and archaeology. It is issued twice a year, in April and October.

== History ==
The Iqbal Review was established in April 1960.

== See also ==
- Iqbal bibliography
- Muhammad Iqbal
- Iqbal Academy Pakistan
