= Rafiuddin Hashmi =

Pakistani researcher and travel writer (1940–2024)

- رفیع الدین ہاشمی
- Born: 9 February 1940; Masriyal, Jhelum District, Punjab Province, British India
- Died: 25 January 2024 (aged 83); Lahore, Punjab, Pakistan
- Education: Ph.D in Urdu
- Alma mater: Oriental College, Lahore, University of the Punjab
- Occupations: Iqbalist, researcher, travel writer
- Awards: Tamgha-e-Imtiaz (2015); Baba-e-Urdu Award; National Presidential Iqbal Award

Rafiuddin Hashmi (Urdu: رفیع الدین ہاشمی; 9 February 1940 – 25 January 2024) was a Pakistani Iqbalist, researcher and travel writer. He was a professor in the Department of Iqbaliat, Oriental College, Lahore and University of the Punjab. Hashmi authored books on Muhammad Iqbal, as well as the Urdu language and literature.

== Early life and education ==
Rafiuddin Hashmi was born on 9 February 1940 in Masriyal, District Chakwal. In 1963, he did his BA in a private capacity and in 1966 he passed the MA Urdu examination from Oriental College Lahore. In 1981, he received his Ph.D. degree from Punjab University. His thesis was on the research and explanatory study of Iqbal's works.

== Career ==
In 1969, he joined the Punjab Education Department and after teaching in various colleges, he was appointed to Oriental College, Lahore in 1982 and retired from there as a professor. He was also the President of the Urdu Department for some time. After retirement, he was also a Distinguished Professor of Higher Education Commission from 2006 to 2008. He was also the editor and assistant editor of many literary, academic and research magazines. He received Baba-e-Urdu Award and National Presidential Iqbal Award.

== Literary works ==
Hashmi authored and compiled books on Iqbal and Urdu language and literature, including genres of literature, letters of Iqbal, bibliography of Iqbal, research and explanatory study of Iqbal's works, Urdu research in universities, memoirs of Lala Sahrai, long poems of Iqbal: Intellectual and technical studies, Iqbal literature of 1985 – a review, Iqbal literature of 1986 – a review, letters of Maududi, Iqbal: problems and debates, hundred years of Iqbal, research sources of Iqbal, Iqbal: understanding and analysis, Hidden in your dust (Travelogue of Spain), Look at the sun (Travelogue of Japan), Schools of Mushfiq Khawaja, Iqbal literature in Pakistan, Allama Iqbal: Personality and Art and others.

== Death ==
Hashmi died on 24 January 2024, at the age of 83.

== Legacy ==
- In recognition of his scholarly and literary services, a collection of essays in Urdu, Persian, Turkish, English, French and German by one of his students, Khalid Nadeem, Armaghan-i-Rafiuddin Hashmi has also been published.
- Nisa, Zaib un; Sahir, Abdul Aziz. ڈاکٹر رفیع الدین ہاشمی کی علمی و ادبی خدمات [Scientific and literary services of Dr. Rafiuddin Hashmi] (Doctoral dissertation). Islamabad, Pakistan: Allama Iqbal Open University.

== Awards and honours ==
- Distinguished Professor of Higher Education Commission (2006–2008)
- Baba-e-Urdu Award
- Presidential Iqbal Award
- Tamgha-e-Imtiaz (2015)
