= Iqbal Academy Pakistan =

- اقبال اکادمی پاکستان
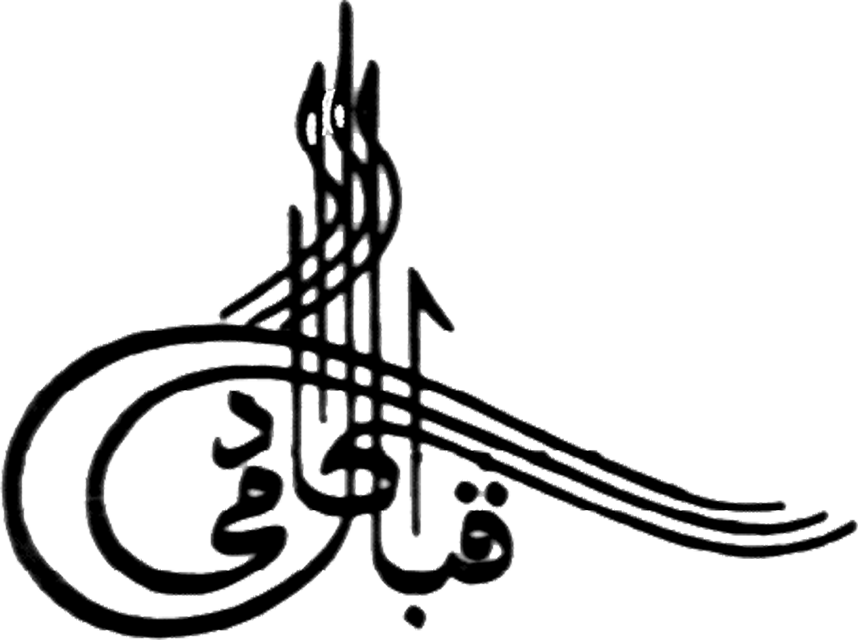

Agency overview
- Formed: 1951
- Headquarters: Lahore, Pakistan; 31.5606214°N 74.3281451°E
- Parent agency: Government of Pakistan
- Key document: Iqbal Academy Ordinance No. XXVI of 1962
- Website: www.iap.gov.pk

Iqbal Academy Pakistan (Urdu:اقبال اکادمی پاکستان) is an institute in Lahore, Pakistan dedicated to the study, promotion, and dissemination of the teachings of Islamic philosopher and poet Muhammad Iqbal. It was established by the Government of Pakistan, through the Iqbal Academy Ordinance No. XXVI of 1962.

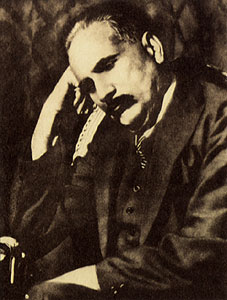
Muhammad Iqbal, then president of the Muslim League in 1930 and address deliverer

== History ==
Iqbal Academy Pakistan was originally established in 1951, under the administrative authority of the education department of the central government of Pakistan, in Karachi. When the capital of Pakistan was moved to Islamabad, the government decided to move Iqbal Academy from Karachi to Lahore, as Muhammad Iqbal, for whom the academy is named, had resided in Lahore, and it is where his tomb is located. In 1976, the Academy moved to 116 McLeod Road, Lahore, to the old residence of Allama Iqbal. The federal government of Pakistan made a gift of a piece of land from a major estate in Lahore, behind one of the Avari Hotels and opposite Faletti's Hotel, to build a state-of-the-art building named Aiwan-e-Iqbal, as a monument and memorial to Iqbal. In 1996, the new building was formally opened by Mian Muhammad Nawaz Sharif, and the Academy moved to the sixth floor.

== Aims and Objectives ==
The aims and objectives of the Academy are to promote and disseminate the study and understanding of the works and teachings of Allama Iqbal.

- to promote the study and understanding of the works of Iqbal;
- to institute scholarships and Lectureships for furthering the study of the works and teachings of Iqbal;
- to publish books, pamphlets and periodicals relating to the said study;
- to award prizes, rewards and donations to authors who, in the opinion of the Academy, have made contributions to the study of the works and teachings of Iqbal, and to enter into contracts with authors in order to carry out the purposes of this Ordinance;
- to organize lectures, talks, discussions, study groups and conferences on Iqbal and to send delegates to conferences held in foreign countries for the study of Iqbal's works and teachings, or for any matter to which that study is relevant or by which it may be advanced or profited;
- to confer in the prescribed manner Fellowships on scholars who, in the opinion of the Academy, have made contributions to the study of the works and teachings of Iqbal;
- to co-operate with, or grant amalgamation or affiliation to, any other association established for a purpose similar to that of the Academy, whether the purpose of that other association is confined to the works and teachings of Iqbal or not; and
- to do such other acts and things as may further the aims and objects of the Academy.

== Composition ==
The Composition of the Academy as laid down in the Iqbal Academy Ordinance 1962 is as follows:

- The Patron-in-chief; (The President of Pakistan)
- Patrons;
- The President; (The Minister…, Government of Pakistan)
- The Vice President (nominated by the Federal Government for a period of three years)
- Honorary members; Life Members; and Members

== Functions ==
In order to translate its objectives into action and activity, Iqbal Academy undertakes measures such as publication programs; IT projects; outreach activities; the Iqbal Award Programme; website, research and compilation, audio-video, multimedia, archive projects; as well as exhibitions, conferences, seminars, projection abroad, research guidance, academic assistance, donations, and library services.

== Administration ==
According to the Ordinance of the Academy, the Governing Body is the highest administration body of Iqbal Academy, and is headed by the Minister for the concerned ministry.

The Executive Committee, headed by the Vice President, is responsible for day-to-day affairs of the Academy. Following is a list of recent vice presidents of Iqbal Academy Pakistan:

- Justice (Rtd) Javed Iqbal (Son of Allama Muhammad Iqbal) - 2007 to 2010
- Dr. Shahzad Qaiser (Renowned Iqbal Scholar, son of Dr. Nazir Qaiser) 2010 to 2013
- Mr. Munib Iqbal (Grandson of Allama Muhammad Iqbal) 2015 to 2018
- Dr. Shahzad Qaiser (Renowned Iqbal Scholar, son of Dr. Nazir Qaiser) 2018 to 2021

The Academy is headed by a Director, The control of the Academy is vested in the Governing Body, headed by the Minister for National Heritage & Culture Division as its President. Dr Muhammad Rafiuddin was the Academy's first Director, from 1953 to 1965. Following is the list of recent Directors of Iqbal Academy Pakistan:

- Mr. Muhammad Suheyl Umar - 1993 to 2014
- Mr. Ahmad Javaid - 2014 to 2015
- Mr. Muhammad Suhail - 2015 to 2016
- Mr. Muhammad Bakhsh Sangi - 2016 to 2018
- Mr. Nazir Ahmad - 2018 to 2020
- Prof. Dr. Baseera Ambreen - 2020 to 2022
- Mr. Anjum Waheed - 2023
- Dr. Abdul Rauf Rafiqui - 2023 to date

== Academic Activities ==
The Iqbal Academy Pakistan’s research falls into seven domains:

- BIOGRAPHICAL AND HISTORICAL RESEARCH: the life & times of Allama Muhammad Iqbal
- PHILOSOPHICAL VISION: of the poet-philosopher
- POETIC EXCELLENCE: critical appreciation of Iqbal’s poetic artistry
- RELEVANCE: Analysis, Critique & Significance to contemporary times
- ACTUALIZATION: Resolving of contemporary issues in the light of Iqbal’s vision
- TRANSLATION: Translation of Allama Iqbal’s work & works on Iqbal’s thought and philosophy in regional & foreign languages
- RESEARCH JOURNALS: To disseminate the message of Allama Iqbal research journals published biannually in Eng. Urdu, Persian, Turkish & Arabic.

== National/International Outreach ==
Iqbal Academy Pakistan engages different sectors of the society through outreach activities by conducting; Conferences, Seminars, Lectures, Workshops, Iqbal Study Circles, TV Talk Shows/Programs, Book Fairs & Exhibitions etc.

The Iqbal Academy Pakistan is committed to the promotion of Iqbal’s thought not only in Pakistan but also across the globe. For this purpose many programs have been undertaken, including: Publications In Foreign Languages

- Translation of the works of Iqbal in major Foreign Languages,
- International Coordination, Networking And Creation Of Linkages
- International Collaborations; Seminars & Conferences
- International Representation; Scholars Exchange Program
- Digital Communication Through The World Wide Web

== Library ==
The Academy library is one of the oldest and most expansive libraries specializing in Iqbal Studies. Its collection of books on Iqbal studies and related subjects have been translated into the major international languages as well as the regional languages of Pakistan. The library's resources are available to many outside students, teachers, and Iqbal scholars. The library has also developed the largest website on Iqbal.

=== Kitabdar ===
In 1989, Iqbal Academy Library developed Pakistan’s first true multilingual library management database software. The software is equally effective for professional and general library use. It can automate large research, reference-based libraries and personal collections alike.

=== Iqbal Cyber Library ===
In 2003, the Academy launched an online library, mainly of works in Urdu, called the Allama Iqbal Cyber Library (علامہ اقبال آفاقی کتب خانہ). Inspired by Project Gutenberg, the library was conceived and developed by Qasim Shahzad under the supervision of Muhammad Suheyl Umar, and it was formally inaugurated by the Governor of the Punjab Lt. Gen. Khalid Maqbool. The main objective of the cyber library is to provide an opportunity, to users globally, for online consultation of significant primary materials—including manuscripts, books, and reference sources—in a multilingual format. This web resource is a unique place on the web for Urdu lovers all over the world. Library holdings consist of 1425 holdings on 188 Subjects—including Iqbal studies (Iqbaliyat), Urdu literature, poetry, shairy, afsaney, ghazals, and other Urdu classics—from 799 contributors writing in 20 languages,

== Presidential Iqbal Award ==
Under the Presidential Order of 1981, the Academy was executing the National and International Presidential Iqbal Awards, which were given on best books written in National and International languages, on Iqbal’s Life and Thought. The award has been reconstituted in 2019, by the Honourable President of Pakistan. Following are the categories of these awards:

- Presidential National Iqbal Award (Urdu) – Annual basis
- Presidential National Iqbal Award (English) – Three year basis
- Presidential Iqbal Award (Pakistani Languages) – Three year basis
- Presidential International Iqbal Award – Three year basis

== IT, Websites, Mobiles Applications ==
Utilising modern means of dissemination the Academy’s IT Section promotes the organisational mission through various initiatives, including: Planning, development, maintenance and implementation of IT Policy, infrastructure and Management Information System. Planning and development of mobile apps based on works of Iqbal. Maintaining & up-gradation of 08 websites, Email system. Maintaining the Network Operation Center, Software & MIS development and implementation. Maintaining E-Governance Framework. Maintenance of pages on social media, like Facebook, Google+, twitter and channels on YouTube etc.

=== Websites ===
Related to Allama Muhammad Iqbal, IT Section of the Academy have been managing various websites.

== Publications and products ==
The Iqbal Academy promotes Iqbal studies through the sale of a number of unique audio, video, and other multimedia products.

== See also ==
- Index of Muhammad Iqbal–related articles
- Muhammad Ali Jinnah
- Javid Iqbal
- Muhammad Munawwar Mirza
- Waheed Qureshi
- Lahore
- Iqbal Academy, UK
- Aiwan-e-Iqbal
- Iqbal Review
- Iqbaliat
- Sialkot
- Mazar-e-Iqbal
