= Ikram Chughtai =

Pakistani researcher and writer (1941–2023)

Muhammad Ikram Chughtai
- Born: Muhammad Ikram; 22 October 1941; Sialkot, Pakistan
- Died: 7 January 2023 (aged 81–82); Lahore, Pakistan
- Education: University of the Punjab
- Occupations: Researcher, translator, historian, biographer
- Known for: Research on Muhammad Husain Azad, Muhammad Asad, Allama Iqbal, Sir Syed Ahmad Khan, Goethe; Compilation of documents related to the 1857 War of Independence; Discovery of rare materials in Urdu research
- Notable work: Mutala-e-Azad; Iqbal, Afghan and Afghanistan; Muhammad Asad: Banda-e-Saharai; Iqbal aur Goethe; 1857: Roznamche aur Yaddashtain; Shahan-e-Awadh ke Kutubkhane; Sir Syed Ahmad Khan: Fikr-e-Islami ki Tabīr-e-Nau; Pīr-e-Rūmi aur Murīd-e-Hindi
- Awards: Austrian Presidential Gold Medal (1998); Presidential Iqbal Award (1999, 2015–2020)

Muhammad Ikram Chughtai (22 October 1941 – 7 January 2023), also written as M. Ikram Chughtai or Ikram Chagatai, was a Pakistani researcher, translator, historian, and biographer. He conducted research on Muhammad Husain Azad and Muhammad Asad and published several rare and previously unpublished documents, contributing to Urdu research. His work in Iqbal Studies is frequently referenced in academic literature. His research methodologies and findings have been cited in Urdu, English, and other languages.

== Early life and education ==
Muhammad Ikram Chughtai was born in Sialkot on 22 October 1941. He obtained a master's degree in Urdu from the University of the Punjab in 1964. He studied Urdu, English, and history, which became the foundation of his academic and research career.

== Career and literary contributions ==
=== Early career ===
Chughtai began his professional journey as a lecturer at the University of the Punjab. He later served as the director at the Urdu Science Board (formerly known as the Central Urdu Board). Additionally, he worked as a research scholar at the Central Urdu Board, Lahore.

=== Research on Muhammad Husain Azad ===
Chughtai conducted research on Muhammad Husain Azad and authored key works such as Maulana Muhammad Husain Azad: Tanqeed o Tahqeeq Ka Dabistan, Muhammad Husain Azad: Nai Daryaft Shuda Makhaz Ki Roshni Mein, and Mutala-e-Azad. These works focus on Azad's literary contributions and aspects of his personal life.

=== Research on Muhammad Asad ===
Chughtai made significant contributions through his research on Muhammad Asad. His notable works include Muhammad Asad: Bandah-e-Sahrai, Muhammad Asad: A European Bedouin, and Home Coming of the Heart, which explore various aspects of Asad's life and intellectual legacy.

=== Work on Iqbal and other figures ===
Chughtai conducted extensive research on Muhammad Iqbal, Goethe, and Syed Ahmad Khan. His book Iqbal, Afghan and Afghanistan explored Iqbal's influence on Afghanistan. He also authored Mutala-e-Azad, focusing on Muhammad Husain Azad, compiled the biography of Deputy Nazir Ahmad, and edited various diaries and memoirs concerning the 1857 War of Independence. Additionally, he curated and analyzed the correspondence of Wajid Ali Shah and conducted research on the works of Khwaja Hasan Nizami.

=== Contributions to Urdu scholarship ===
Chughtai utilized archival documents such as the Delhi College register and Azad's pension records for his research. He conducted studies in German, French, Persian, and Arabic, which enabled him to access various libraries in Vienna, Berlin, Rome, London, Washington, and Paris. One of his research areas was the early life and academic background of Austrian orientalist Aloys Sprenger. His edited book, Shahān-e-Awadh ke Kutubkhane, is an Urdu translation of Sprenger's A Catalogue of the Arabic, Persian and Hindûstâny Manuscripts, of the Libraries of the King of Oudh.

According to Moinuddin Aqeel, Chughtai highlighted the works of three Northern Indian poets—Mail Dehlavi, Figar Dehlavi, and Aadeena Beg Kamil—for the first time. Aqeel also noted Chughtai's contributions to Urdu research.

=== Lexicographical contributions ===
In 1976, Chughtai's edited version of S.W. Fallon's English-Urdu Dictionary was published. He also contributed to the compilation of the Nau Zubani Lughat (transl. Nine-Language Dictionary), released by the Urdu Science Board, Lahore in 1974.

=== Lexicographical contributions ===
In 1976, Chughtai's edited version of S.W. Fallon's English-Urdu Dictionary was published. He also contributed to the compilation of the Nau Zubani Lughat (transl. Nine-Language Dictionary), released by the Urdu Science Board, Lahore in 1974.

== Awards and honours ==
The Austrian government awarded Chughtai the Presidential Gold Medal in 1998 for his research contributions.

In 1999, he received the Presidential Iqbal Award for his book Goethe, Iqbal and the Orient.

In October 2022, the Pakistani government approved another Presidential Iqbal Award for his book Iqbal aur Germany.

Chughtai died on 7 January 2023, before this award could be formally conferred.

== Literary works ==
Chughtai authored books in Urdu and English, covering various topics. He also translated works from other languages into Urdu. Some of his notable publications include:

Urdu

- Shahān-e-Awadh ke Kutubkhāne (Libraries of the Kings of Oudh)
- Āsār al-Bīrūnī (Research on the life and contributions of Al-Biruni)
- Iqbal aur Germany (Muhammad Iqbal and Germany)
- Iqbal aur Goethe (Iqbal and Goethe)
- Muhammad Asad: Banda-e-Sahrā’ī (Muhammad Asad: Man of the Desert)
- Mutāla-e-Āzād (Collected essays on Muhammad Husain Azad)
- Muhammad Husain Azad: Naye Daryāft Shuda Maakhiz ki Roshni Mein (Muhammad Husain Azad: Based on Newly Discovered Sources)
- Ek Nazar Kafi Hai (Modern Austrian poetry selection, co-authored with Aslam Kolsari)
- Figār Dehlvi – Hayat aur Kalam (Life and Works of Figār Dehlvi)
- Husain bin Mansur Hallaj (compilation)
- Sir Syed Ahmad Khan: Fikr-e-Islami ki Tabīr-e-Nau (Translation of C.W. Troll's work with Afzal Hussain)
- Goethe Ba-taur Scientist (Goethe as a Scientist)
- Tārīkh-e-Mashghala (Correspondence of Wajid Ali Shah Akhtar with Nawab Abadi Jan Begum, with annotations)
- Mawlānā Jalāl ad-Dīn Rūmī: Hayat aur Afkār (Life and Ideas of Rumi)
- Pīr-e-Rūmī wa Murīd-e-Hindī (A Comparative Study of Rumi and Iqbal)
- Iqbal, Afghan aur Afghanistan (Iqbal, Afghan, and Afghanistan in Urdu, English, Persian, and Pashto)
- Ek Duniya Sab ke Liye (Urdu translation of a German work)
- 1857: Roznāmche, Mu’āṣir Teḥrīrein (1857: Diaries and Contemporary Writings)
- Shāh Walīullāh (Biography, works, etc., of Shah Waliullah Dehlawi)
- Majmū'a-e-Khwaja Hasan Nizami (Collected works of Khwaja Hasan Nizami)
- Dātā Sāhib: Hayat wa Afkār (Biography and contributions of Ali Hujwiri)
- Tārīkh-e-Yūsufi al-ma’rūf Ajāibāt-e-Farang

English

- Iqbal: New Dimensions
- Goethe, Iqbal and the Orient (Research on the intellectual parallels between German poet Goethe and Iqbal)
- Iqbal & Goethe
- Hammer-Purgstall and the Muslim India
- Bibliography of Annemarie Schimmel's Works (Comprehensive bibliography of Annemarie Schimmel's writings)
- Writings of Dr. Litner (the life and achievements of British orientalist Gottlieb Wilhelm Leitner)
- Home Coming of the Heart (editing of the part two of The Road to Mecca)
- Muhammad Asad: A European Bedouin
- Jamal-ud-Din Afghani: A Promoter of Muslim Unity
- Maulana Rumi: Bridge of East and West
- Rumi: In the Light of Western and Eastern Scholarship
- Data Ganj Bakhsh of Lahore
- Sir Syed Ahmad Khan: A Prominent Muslim Politician, and Educationist

== Death ==
Chughtai died on 7 January 2023 at Shaikh Zayed Hospital, Lahore. His death was noted by academic and literary circles as a significant loss to Urdu research. Moeen Nizami and other scholars described it as an irreparable loss.
