= Ilm al-Iqtisad =

Economics book

Ilm-ul-Iqtisad (علم الاقتصاد)
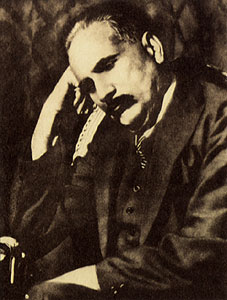
- Sir Muhammad Iqbal, author of 'Ilm al-Iqtisad'
- Author: Muhammad Iqbal
- Language: Urdu
- Genre: Economics
- Publication date: 1903
- Publication place: British Raj
- ISBN: 978-969-416-502-8

Ilm ul-Iqtisad (Urdu: علم الاقتصاد) (transl. The Science of Economics) was a book written by Muhammad Iqbal, the great poet-philosopher of the Indian subcontinent. It was published in 1903 and is considered the first or one of the earliest books on economics in the Urdu Language.

== See also ==
- Index of Muhammad Iqbal–related articles
