= Waheed Qureshi =

Pakistani writer, critic, researcher (1925–2009)

Waheed Qureshi وحید قریشی
- Born: 14 February 1925; Mianwali, Punjab, British India
- Died: 17 October 2009 (aged 84); Lahore Pakistan
- Education: Government College University
- Known for: Urdu literature and Linguistics
- Awards: Pride of Performance (1993)
- Scientific career
- Fields: Urdu literature, Persian literature, History and Linguistics
- Workplaces: Oriental College, Punjab University, Lahore

Waheed Qureshi (Urdu: وحید قریشی) (14 February 1925 – 17 October 2009) was a Pakistani linguist, literary critic, writer, researcher, educationalist and scholar of Urdu literature and oriental languages. Qureshi helped shape the mood and colour of research on oriental languages and literature.

== Education ==
Born as Abdul Waheed on 14 February 1925 in Mianwali in British India (now in Pakistan), Qureshi got his early education in Lahore. He obtained an honours degree in Persian in 1944, a master's degree in Persian in 1946 and a master's degree in History in 1950 from Government College, Lahore.

From 1947 to 1950, he remained Alfred Patiala Research Scholar at the University of Punjab, Lahore. In 1952, he wrote his thesis "Insha Literature in Persian – A Critical Study" and obtained a PhD degree in classical Persian prose. He wrote another research dissertation on the poet Mir Hasan and his poetry in 1964, and obtained a D.Litt in Urdu as a language.

Being devoted to books since childhood, he began building his personal library when he was a student and had turned it into a sizeable collection of rare Urdu and Persian books and manuscripts before he died.

== Career ==
Waheed Qureshi was appointed lecturer in Oriental College, Punjab University, Lahore in 1963 and he became its university principal in 1980. He worked as dean of Islamic and Oriental Learning for many years. During his tenure at the National Language Authority as its chairman, he got published a large number of research dissertations and technical books and strove for the implementation of Urdu as the official language of Pakistan. Nearly a year after his death in October 2009, Iftikhar Arif who replaced him as chairman, National Language Authority and some other literary critics felt that the struggle for 'Urdu language as the official language of Pakistan' had significantly slowed down after Waheed Qureshi's death.

He entered the literary circles with a bang in late 1940s when he wrote Shibli ki hayat-i-muashaqa, a research work that unearthed the love-life of Shibli Nomani, a renowned Muslim scholar, and tried to portray him as a human in the light of Freudian theories. He psychoanalysed Shibli's personality as reflected in his Persian ghazals and his letters addressed to Atiya Fayzee.

In addition to his two doctoral dissertations, his works that earned him name and respect of his peers were his critical studies, research papers and annotated and edited versions of some classical Urdu and Persian works. Another contribution of his is towards understanding the ideological basis of Pakistan, Pakistan movement and poetry of Iqbal. He remained editor of several literary and research journals, including Saheefa, Iqbal Review and Iqbal for many years. The institutions that benefited from his acumen include Maghribi Pakistan Urdu Academy, Bazm-i-Iqbal and Iqbal Academy Pakistan. He held the charge of Director Iqbal Academy Pakistan from July 1982 to April 1983 in first term and from September 1993 to June 1997 in second term.

He authored around 30 books. His extensive and in-depth study of Oriental literature, familiarity with German and French, and engagement with the social sciences enabled him to develop a distinctive literary approach—one that skillfully blended critical analysis with scholarly research.

Dr. Waheed Qureshi was a researcher, critic, poet, teacher, administrator and known as a witty person. One manifestation of his wit was his satirical literary column in Daily Jang, which he wrote with the pseudonym Mir Jumla Lahori. He also gave comic speeches on Radio Pakistan on several occasions.

== Awards and recognition ==
- Niaz Fatehpuri Literary Award (1984)
- Tufail Literary Award (1986)
- Pride of Performance Award by the President of Pakistan (1993)
- Presidential Iqbal Award (2003)

== Death ==
Dr. Waheed Qureshi died on 17 October 2009 in Lahore, Pakistan.

== Books ==
The author of more than 70 books in English, Urdu, Punjabi and Persian, some of his notable publications include:

- Ideological foundations of Pakistan
- Oriental studies: the Indian, Persian, and other essays
- Urdū kā bihtarīn inshāʼī adab : Rajab ʻAlī Beg se daur-i ḥāz̤ir tak, a selection of best Urdu essays, 18th century to date
- Dīvān-i Jahān̲dār, edition of the collected poetry of a classical Urdu poet, Javān Bak̲h̲t Jahān̲dār
- Armag̲h̲ān-i Īrān; Maqālāt-i muntak̲h̲abah-yi majallah-yi ṣaḥīfah, on Persian literature
- Mut̤ālaʻah-yi Ḥālī
- Asāsiyāt-i Iqbāl, scholarly study of the works of Sir Muhammad Iqbal, 1877–1938
- Nazr-i Ghālib,
- Qāʼid-i Aʻẓam aur taḥrīk-i Pākistān, on the role played by Mahomed Ali Jinnah, 1876–1948, in the Pakistan movement

Preceded by Prof. Muhammad Munawwar Mirza	Director Iqbal Academy; 1993–1997	Succeeded by Muhammad Suheyl Umar -
