= Muhammad Munawwar Mirza =

Pakistani scholar

Muhammad Munawwar Mirza (Punjabi, Urdu: محمد منور مرزا) (born 27 Mar 1923 – 7 February 2000) was a prominent Iqbal scholar, historian, writer and intellectual from Pakistan.

== Life and contribution ==
Muhammad Munawwar Mirza giving a talk

Born on 23 March 1923, he did his master's degree in Urdu, Arabic and Philosophy from the University of the Punjab. He started his teaching career in 1953, which continued, to his Government College years until his retirement in 1980. He was appointed the chairman, Department of Iqbal Studies, university Oriental College, Lahore from 1981 to 1985. He was appointed Director Iqbal Academy Pakistan from 1985 to 1988 and then from 1991 to 1993. He was a Member and office holder of many Committees and formations. Prof. Muhammad Munawwar wrote a large number of books relating to Iqbal Studies, Pakistan Movement, Islamic Studies, Literature and other topics. He contributed hundreds of articles on various topics, which were published in journals of International repute. He also translated a number of books from Arabic and English to Urdu. He attended a large number of National and International Conferences held in Pakistan and abroad. His book relating to the Iqbal Studies entitled Iqbal and Quranic Wisdom won the National Presidential Iqbal Award in 1986. As an acknowledgment and token of appreciation of his contributions, Prof. Muhammad Munawwar was awarded Sitara-i-Imtiaz by the Government of Pakistan. His son-in-law Salahuddin Ayyubi is also a prolific writer. His granddaughter Ambreen Salahuddin and her husband Sajjad Bloch are poets.

== Works ==
Some of his major publications include:

=== Books ===
- Iqbal : poet-philosopher of Islam
- Iqbal and Quranic wisdom
- Dimensions of Pakistan movement
- Mīzān-i Iqbāl. Critical study of the Persian and Urdu poetry of Sir Muhammad Iqbal, 1877–1938, with emphasis on his forceful advocacy of Panislamism
- Dimensions of Iqbal
- Iqbal on human perfection
- Burhān-i Iqbāl. On the religious convictions of Sir Muhammad Iqbal, 1877–1938, national poet of Pakistan
- ʻAllāmah Iqbāl kī Fārsī g̲h̲azal
- Qirt̤ās-i Iqbāl. Articles based on the ideology and works of Sir Muhammad Iqbal, 1877–1938; a research study
- Abḥāth dhikrá Iqbāl al-miʼawīyah. In Arabic
- Pākistān, ḥiṣār-i Islām. Articles on the history and politics of Pakistan written during a span of 50 years
- Īqān Iqbāl
- Maz̤āmīn-i Munavvar. Critical essays on 19th and 20th century Urdu authors
- Karam farmā. Short biographical sketches of Pakistani celebrities from different walks of life
- Īqān-i Iqbāl
- Aulād-i Ādam

=== Translations ===
- Tīn Musalmān failsūf. Translation from the English of Seyyed Hossein Nasr's Three Muslim Sages: Avicenna—Suhrawardi—Ibn Arabi
- Siyāsatʹnāmah. Translation from the Arabic of Nizam al-Mulk's Siyasatnama

== Awards and recognition ==
- Presidential Iqbal Award

== See also ==
- Iqbaliat

Preceded by Mr. Shohrat Bukhari	Director Iqbal Academy; 1991–1993	Succeeded by Dr. Waheed Qureshi
