= Saiyed Sarawan =

- Village
- Location in Uttar Pradesh, India
- Coordinates: 25.48150°N 81.62521°E
- Country India: India
- State: Uttar Pradesh
- District: Kaushambi
- Founder: Saiyed Mohammad Haqqani

Languages
  - Official: Urdu and Hindi language
- Time zone: UTC+5:30 (IST)
- PIN: 212213

Saiyed Sarawan is a large village in Muratganj Block in Chail panchayat, Kaushambi district, Uttar Pradesh, India.
