= Tarana-e-Milli =

Urdu poem

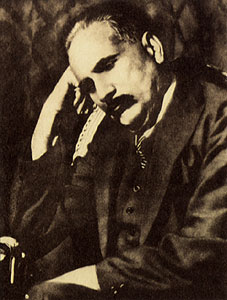
Iqbal

"Tarana-e-Milli" (Urdu: ترانۂ ملی) or "Anthem of the Community" is an enthusiastic poem in which Allama Mohammad Iqbal paid tribute to the Muslim Ummah (nation) and said that Islam is the religion of the world. He recognised all Muslims anywhere in the world as part of a single nation, whose leader is Muhammad, the prophet of Islam.

Iqbal wrote the poem a few years after writing a poem in the same meter and rhyme scheme called Tarana-e-Hindi (more commonly known as Sare Jahan Se Accha). During the time between the writing of the two poems, Iqbal's worldview had changed dramatically, Tarana-e-Hindi is an old song that glorifies the land of India (which at the time comprised the territories that now constitute India, Pakistan and Bangladesh) and the people who live in it; it also suggests that people should not be divided by religion and should instead be connected by a common national identity. "Tarana-e-Milli", on the other hand, argues that a global, Islamic community should come above all and even warns against a nationalistic worldview. This reflects the dramatic change in Iqbal's views, and his support for the Muslim League and the Pakistan Movement.

== Poem ==
Urdu text

مسلم ہیں ہم، وطن ہے سارا جہاں ہمارا	چین و عرب ہمارا، ہندوستان ہمارا
آساں نہیں مٹانا، نام و نشاں ہمارا	توحید کی امانت، سینوں میں ہے ہمارے
ہم اس کے پاسباں ہیں، وہ پاسباں ہمارا	دنیا کے بتکدوں میں، پہلا وہ گھر خدا کا
خنجر ہلال کا ہے، قومی نشاں ہمارا	تیغوں کے سایے میں ہم، پل کر جواں ہوئے ہیں
تھمتا نہ تھا کسی سے، سیلِ رواں ہمارا	مغرب کی وادیوں میں، گونجی اذاں ہماری
سو بار کر چکا ہے، تو امتحاں ہمارا	باطل سے دبنے والے، اے آسماں نہیں ہم
تھا تیری ڈالیوں میں، جب آشیاں ہمارا	اے گلستانِ اندلُس! وہ دن ہیں یاد تجھ کو
اب تک ہے تیرا دریا، افسانہ خواں ہمارا	اے موجِ دجلہ، تو بھی پہچانتی ہے ہم کو
ہے خوں تری رگوں میں، اب تک رواں ہمارا	اے ارضِ پاک تیری، حرمت پہ کٹ مرے ہم
اس نام سے ہے باقی، آرامِ جاں ہمارا	سالارِ کارواں ہے، میرِ حجاز اپنا
ہوتا ہے جادہ پیما، پھر کارواں ہمارا	اقباؔل کا ترانہ، بانگِ درا ہے گویا

Roman Transliteration

Chin o Arab hamaraa hindostaaN hamaara

Muslim hain hum; watan hai saara jahaaN hamaara

tawheed ki amaanat seenoN meiN hai hamaarey

aasaaN naheeN miTaana naam o nishaaN hamaara

dunyaN ke but-kadoN meiN pahlaa who ghar KHUDA kaa

hum uskey paasbaaN haiN who paasbaaN hamaara

tayghon key saaye meiN hum, pal kar jawaaN huwey haiN

khanjar hilaal kaa hai qawmi nishaaN hamaara

maghrib ki waadiyoN meiN guunji azaaN hamaari

thamata na thaa kisee se sayl rawaaN hamaara

baatil se dabney waaley ay aasmaaN nahiN hum

sau baar kar chukaa hai tu imtihaaN hamaara

ay gulsitaan e andalus! who din haiN yaad tujh ko

thaa teri DaaliyoN par jab aashiyaaN hamaara

ay mawjey dajlah! tu bhi pahchaanti hai hum ko

ab tak hai tera daryaa afsaana khwaaN hamaara

ay arz e paak! teri hurmat pey kaT marey hum

hai khooN teri ragoN meiN ab tak rawaaN hamaara

saalaar e kaarwaaN hai Mir e Hijaz apnaa

is naam se hai baaqi aaraam e jaaN hamaara

Iqbal kaa taraana baang e daraa hai goyaa

hotaa hai jaadah paymaa phir kaarwaaN hamaara

English Translation

Chin (which refers to China or Chinese Turkestan) is ours, Arabia is ours, India is ours,

We are Muslims and the whole world is our homeland,

The treasure of tawhid is in our hearts,

It is not easy to wipe out our name and mark.

The first house we have liberated from idols is the Ka'abah;

We are its custodians, and It is our protector

We have grown up in the shadows of swords,

Our mascot is the crescent shaped dagger

Our prayer calls have reverberated in the valleys of the west,

The force of our flow could not be stopped by anyone

O the skies! we will not be subdued by falsehood,

You have tried (our steadfasteness) a hundred times!

O, the garden of Andalusia! do you remember those days -

When our abode was the nest on your branches?

O, the waves of Tigris! surely, you recognise us -

Your river tells our tales even to this day

O, the pure soil of Makkah! we have bled and died for your honor,

Our blood flows in your veins until now

The leader of our caravan, is the Prince of Hijaz (Muhammad)

It is his name that keeps our heart in comfort and peace.

Iqbal's song is a clarion call

For the caravan to rise and continue the journey once more

== See also ==
- Index of Muhammad Iqbal–related articles
- Muhammad Iqbal
- Pakistan
