= Abdussalam Puthige =

Indian writer

Abdussalam Puthige (A.S. Puthige)
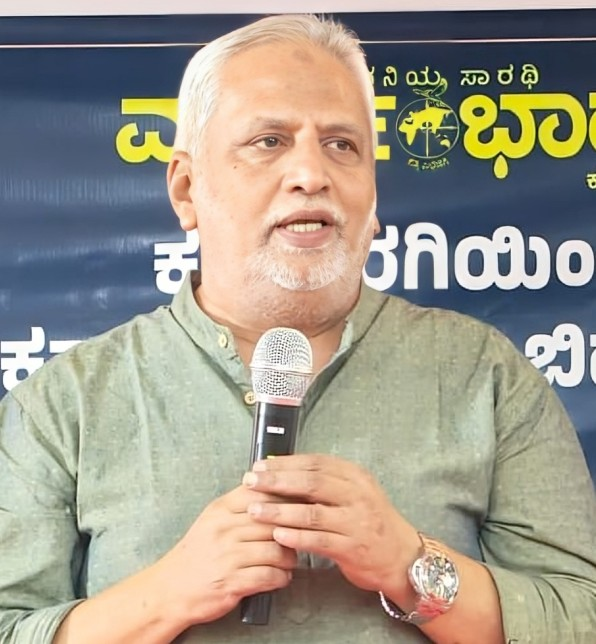
- Abdussalam Puthige
- Born: 2 April 1964 (age 62); Ganjimutt, Dakshina Kannada district, Karnataka
- Citizenship: Indian
- Education: SDM Law College, Mangalore
- Occupations: Journalist, Author, Translator, Media Trainer
- Writing career
- Language: Urdu, Kannada, English, Beary, Tulu
- Genre: Present
- Notable works: Towards Performing Da'wah Kannada Translation of the Quran, English Translation of Allama Iqbal's Shikwa & Jawab Shikwa(ISBN 9789670957005)
- Notable awards: Transparency International Award 2009
- Website: abdussalamputhige.com vbnewsonline.com/home/ qurankannada.com

Abdussalam Puthige (born 2 April 1964) is the editor-in-chief and the managing director of Varthabharathi, a Kannada daily newspaper published from Karnataka, India. The first issue of Vartha Bharati was released on 29 August 2003 from Mangalore. The newspaper presently publishes four print editions from Mangalore, Bengaluru, Shivamogga and the recently launched Kalyana Karnataka edition.

== Early life and education ==
Abdussalam Puthige was born in Ganjimutt near Mangalore, Karnataka, to Marhoom Maulana E. M. Shafi and Marhoom Ruqiya Hasan. He studied history at the University of Madras and obtained a Postgraduate Diploma in Human Rights from the Indian Institute of Human Rights, New Delhi. He later studied law at SDM Law College, Mangalore.

== Career ==
Puthige is a prominent figure in Indian journalism, literature and translation. His journey into the world of media commenced with his commitment to social justice. He has been Director of Madhyama Kendra (Media Centre), Bengaluru, since 1996. Madhyama Kendra is a media-oriented institution that imparts training in journalism and conducts critical studies on Media and Mass Communication.

In 2003, he co-founded Vartha Bharati along with like-minded colleagues. Under his leadership, the newspaper evolved from a regional daily into a widely recognised media organisation with print editions from Mangalore, Shivamogga and Bengaluru. The newspaper has often been described as a significant platform of alternative journalism in Kannada, and is particularly noted for the meaningful attention it gives to the challenges faced by weaker and deprived sections of society, focusing on issues that are usually ignored by many popular media houses. Its simple language, analytical editorials, investigative reports and commentaries are widely circulated and appreciated in Kannada literary and intellectual circles.

Puthige guided the newspaper’s expansion into online media, making active use of platforms such as Facebook, YouTube and Instagram to reach wider audiences. Vartha Bharati today operates a popular Kannada news portal and an English news portal, in addition to a prominent Kannada YouTube news channel. The organisation maintains among the highest audience engagement rates on Facebook and Instagram for Kannada newspapers.

Puthige is the managing trustee of the Community Media Trust (CMT), Mangalore, which owns Vartha Bharati, and is managing director of Samvahana Campaigns Pvt Ltd and Madhyama Communications Ltd. He is also a member of the Press Club, Bengaluru, and a member of the Karnataka State Minorities Commission.

== Works ==
Puthige has authored, translated and edited several works, reflecting his long association with marginalised communities and social journalism. His most noted contribution is his Kannada translation of the Qur’an, Kannadadalli Qur’an Anuvada (2012), released at Dharmasthala by Dr Veerendra Heggade. The translation has undergone multiple editions; the third edition was published in Dubai by the Department of Islamic Affairs and inaugurated by MK Lokesh, then Ambassador of India to the UAE. The translation is available online and through the Android application Quran in Kannada. A mobile application with audio and text in Arabic and Kannada, published by Madhyama Prakashana in 2020 remains one of the most downloaded Kannada Qur’an apps on Google Play. Goodword, a reputed publishing house, has also published a pocket-sized edition of the translation.

His influential work, Towards Performing Da’wah (1997), was published in Leicester, United Kingdom, by the International Council for Islamic Information (ICII). He has annotated English translations of Allama Muhammad Iqbal’s works including The Complaint and the Answer (Shikwa aur Jawab-e-Shikwa, 2016) and The Devil’s Advisory Council (Iblees ki Majlis-e-Shura, 2016), published by Islamic Book Trust in association with The Other Press, Malaysia

== Prominent Awards and recognition ==
- Transparency International Award (2009), for journalistic ethics and integrity
- Sandesha Media Award (2024), Sandesha Foundation, Mangalore
- Karnataka Media Academy Lifetime Achievement Award (2024)
- ST PAULS National Media Awards – Excellence in Digital Journalism (2025)

== Public presence ==
Puthige is known as an orator in Kannada, English and Urdu, and has delivered lectures at universities and institutions in India and abroad. He participated in person at the 16th Session of the United Nations Forum on Minority Issues, held in Geneva, Switzerland, on 30 November and 1 December 2023.

He is regarded as an influential media figure in Karnataka, particularly noted for promoting alternative journalism rooted in social justice and representation of marginalised groups.

== See also ==
- Vartha Bharati
