= Muhammad Iqbal bibliography =

This is a selective list of scholarly works related to Islamic philosopher and poet Muhammad Iqbal.

== Statistics ==
The literature on Iqbal is extensive: critic Rauf Parekh, basing himself on the works of Prof Dr Haroonur Rasheed Tabassum, talks of at least 300 books while, when it comes to articles, a team from the KU Leuven has referenced 2,500 articles, keeping in mind that the bibliography stopped at 1998 and that they only concern items in Latin script (thus not Urdu and other Oriental languages where publications on Iqbal are more numerous.)

In 2023, Dr Rafiuddin Hashmi compiled a descriptive bibliography of works (books, articles, special issues of magazines, etc.) on Iqbal’s life and works in the Urdu language, Kitabiyaat-e-Iqbal, listing some 6,000 items.

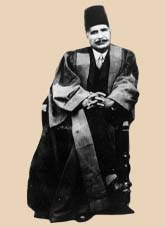
Allama Iqbal after the conferment of a Doctorate of Literature by the University of the Punjab in 1933

== Books ==
=== Translations (English) ===
- Nicholson, Reynold A. (tr. from original in Persian ) (1920). Secrets of the Self (Asrar-i khudi) – A philosophical poem by Sheikh Muhammad Iqbal. Macmillan & Co., London.
- Abbas, Prof. S.G. (18 February 1997). Dr Muhammad Iqbal – The Humanist. Iqbal Academy Pakistan. ISBN 969-416-030-8.
- Akhtar, Sultan Zahoor (1998). Representation and Reply (Shikwah/ Jawab-i-Shikwah). Iqbal Academy Pakistan. ISBN 969-416-028-6.
- Dar, Bashir Ahmad (7 August 1996). Iqbal's Gulshan-i-Raz-i-Jadeed & Bandagi Namah. Iqbal Academy Pakistan. ISBN 969-416-068-5.
- Hajný, Filip (7 August 2023). Khutbat-i-Iqbal. Iqbal Academy, Pakistan. ISBN 978-969-416-301-7.
- Khalil, M.A.K (7 August 1997). The Call of the Marching Bell (Bang-I-Dara). M.A.K. Khalil. ISBN 969-416-069-3.
- Kiernan, Victor (2003). Poems from Iqbal. Iqbal Academy Pakistan. ISBN 969-416-002-2.
- Mirza, M. Yaqub (7 August 1991). A Selection and Translation of Iqbaliat. Iqbal Academy Pakistan. ISBN 969-416-067-7.
- Zubair, Suleman (7 August 1997). Expostulation with the Almighty (Shikwah/Jawab-i- Shikwah). Iqbal Academy Pakistan. ISBN 969-416-026-X.

=== Translations (Spanish) ===
- Calderon, Jose Esteban. La Reconstruccion Del Pensamiento Religioso En EL Islam. ISBN 969-416-013-8.

=== Translations (French) ===
- Mujahid, Sharif-al; Annotation Brigitte Piquard. Iqbal LE Poete de L' Islam. ISBN 969-416-276-9.

=== Biography ===
- Ahmad, Doris (7 August 2023). Iqbal As I Knew Him. Iqbal Academy Pakistan. ISBN 978-969-416-074-0.
- Iqbal, Javid. Zinda Rood.
- Mir, Mustansir (5 July 2006). Iqbal. I.B. Tauris. ISBN 1-84511-094-3.
- Rashid, Saeed. Mukalmat-e-Iqbal.
- Rashid, Saeed. Tazkara-e-Iqbal.

=== Critical appreciation ===
- Khatoon, Jamila (7 August 1997). The Place of God, Man and Universe in the Philosophic System of Iqbal. Iqbal Academy Pakistan. ISBN 969-416-035-9.
- Erfan, Niaz. Iqbal & Existentialism and Other Articles. ISBN 969-416-055-3.
- Dar, Bashir Ahmad. Articles on Iqbal. ISBN 969-416-053-7.
- Maitre, Luce-Claude. Introduction to the Thought of Iqbal. Translated by M.A.M. Dar. ISBN 969-416-052-9.
- Siddiqi, Nazeer. Iqbal – in his Varied Aspects. ISBN 969-416-050-2.
- Anwar, Khurshid. The Epistemology of Iqbal. ISBN 969-416-048-0.
- Khan, Zulfiqar Ali. Voice from East. Southgate Publishers. ISBN 969-416-005-7.
- Qaiser, Nazir (7 August 2023). A Critique of Western Psychology and Psychotherapy and Iqbal's Approach. Iqbal Academy Pakistan. ISBN 978-969-416-072-6.
- Schimmel, A (1989). Gabriel's Wing. Iqbal Academy Pakistan. ISBN 969-416-012-X.
- McDonough, Sheila (2007). The Flame of Sinai. ISBN 978-969-416-313-0.
- Munawwar, M (7 August 2023). Dimensions of Iqbal. Iqbal Academy Pakistan. ISBN 978-969-416-059-7.
- Munawwar, M (2001). Iqbal on Human Perfection. Iqbal Academy Pakistan. ISBN 969-416-265-3.
- Munawwar, M (7 August 2023). Iqbal and Quranic Wisdom. Iqbal Academy. ISBN 978-969-416-060-3.
- Munawwar, M (7 August 2023). Iqbal-Poet Philosopher of Islam. Iqbal Academy Pakistan. ISBN 978-969-416-061-0.

=== Comparative studies ===
- Chaghatai, M. Akram (7 August 2023). Iqbal and Goethe. ʻAllāmah Iqbāl Opan Yūnīvarsiṭī. ISBN 978-969-416-292-8.
- Maruf, Muhammed (1987). Iqbal and his Contemporary Western Religious Thought. Iqbal Academy Pakistan. ISBN 969-416-051-0.
- Qaiser, Nazir (2001). Iqbal and the Western Philosophers. Iqbal Academy Pakistan. ISBN 969-416-304-8.
- Qaiser, Shahzad. Iqbal and Khawaja Ghulam Farid on Experiencing God.
- Sabir, Ghulam (2003). Kierkegaard and Iqbal. Iqbal Academy Pakistan. ISBN 969-416-316-1.
- Khan, Wazir Mohammed Ashraf (1959). Iqbal aour Goethe. Lahore.

=== Iqbal and Pakistan movement ===
- Ali, Perveen Shawkat. "Iqbal and the sub-continents' politics", The Political philosophy of Iqbal. Lahore: united, (N.D).
- Ali, Perveen Shawkat. "Iqbal and the Genesis of Pakistan", The political philosophy of Iqbal. Lahore: United (N.D).
- Ahmad, S. Hasan (1979). "The Concept of Pakistan", Iqbal, his political ideas at the crossroads. Aligarh: Prinwell Publication.
- Hussain, Riaz (1977). "Towards Pakistan", The politics of Iqbal. Lahore: Islamic book service.
- Hussain, Riaz (1977). "Iqbal's View of Indian history", the politics of Iqbal. Lahore: Islamic book service.
- Tasawur, T.A. "Iqbal: his vision of a Muslim home land", Iqbal studies and Pakistan news papers. Lahore: Bazm-e-Iqbal.
- Rastogi, T.C. "Iqbal and Political awakening in India", Iqbal in final countdown. Delhi: Omsons publications.
- Hafeez Malik, ed. (1971). "Ideology of Muslim nationalism", Iqbal poet philosopher of Pakistan. London: Columbia University Press.
- Vahid, S.A. "Iqbal as architect of Pakistan", Introduction to Iqbal. Karachi: Pakistan publications.
- Naim, C.M. (ed.) (1979). Iqbal, Jinnah and Pakistan: the vision and the reality. Syracuse University. ISBN 0-915984-81-4.
- Malik, Rashida (7 August 2023). Iqbal and the Concept of Pakistan. Iqbal Academy Pakistan. ISBN 978-969-416-310-9.
- Malik, Rashida (January 2003). Iqbal : The Spiritual Father of Pakistan. Sang-e-Meel Publications. ISBN 969-35-1371-1.

=== General books ===
- Munawwar, M (7 August 2023). Iqbal's Contribution to Literature and Politics. Iqbal Academy Pakistan. ISBN 978-969-416-277-5.
- Umar, M. S (7 August 2023). "That I May See and Tell" Significance of Iqbal's Wisdom Poetry. Iqbal Academy Pakistan. ISBN 978-969-416-278-2.

=== Commentary ===
- Chishti, Yousaf Saleem. Sharah Baal e Jibreel.
- Chishti, Yousaf Saleem. Sharah Musnawi Pas Cah Baeed Kurd Moa Musafir.
- Chishti, Yousaf Saleem. Sharah Arghman e Hijaz (Hissa Farsi).
- Chishti, Yousaf Saleem. Sharah Arghman e Hijaz.
- Chishti, Yousaf Saleem. Sharah Israar e Khudi.
- Chishti, Yousaf Saleem. Sharah Piyaam e Mashriq.
- Chishti, Yousaf Saleem. Sharah Bang e Dara.
- Chishti, Yousaf Saleem. Sharah Zarb e Klim.

== See also ==
- Index of Muhammad Iqbal–related articles
