= Allahabad Address =

1930 Allahabad speech by Muhammad Iqbal

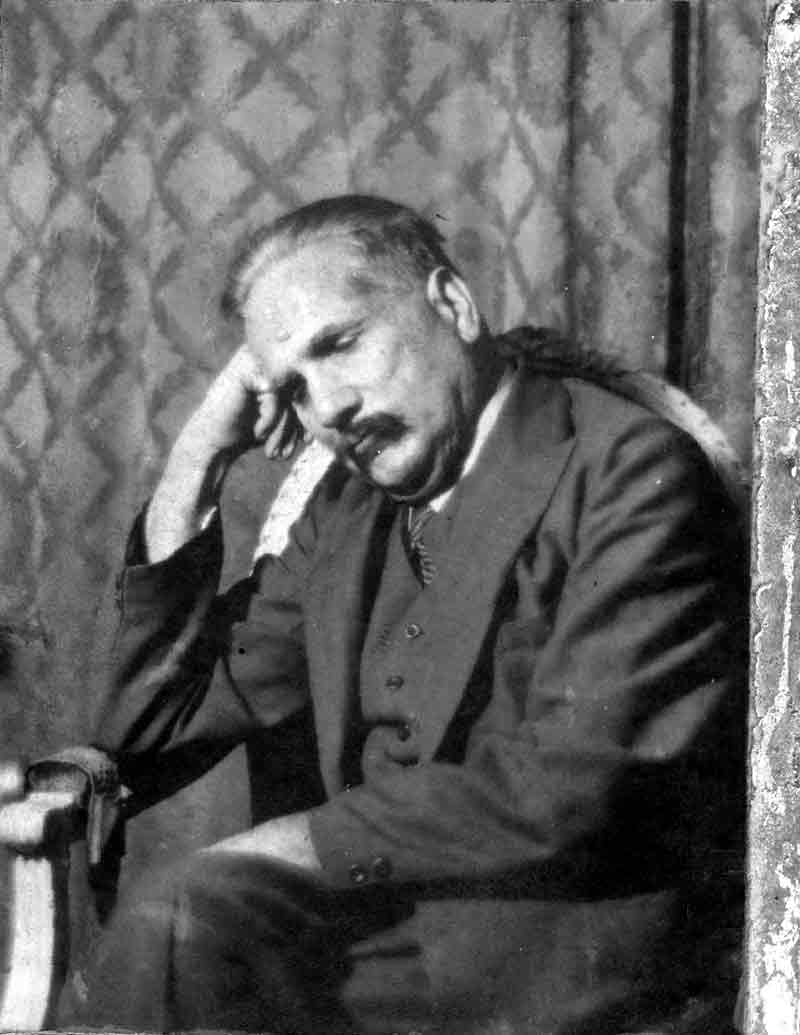
Muhammad Iqbal, then president of the Muslim League in 1930 and address deliverer

The Allahabad Address (Urdu: خطبہ الہ آباد) was a speech by the philosopher-poet, and scholar Sir Muhammad Iqbal, one of the best-known in Pakistani history. It was delivered by Iqbal during the 21st annual session of the All-India Muslim League, on the afternoon of Monday, 29 December 1930, at Allahabad in United Provinces (U. P.). In this address, Iqbal outlined a vision of independent states for the great Muslim-majority provinces in northwestern India, thus becoming the first politician to articulate what would become known as the Two-nation theory—that Muslims of India are a distinct nation and thus deserve political independence from other regions and communities of India.

Allama Iqbal defined the Muslims of India as a nation and suggested that there could be no possibility of peace in the country unless and until they were recognised as a nation and under a federal system, the Muslim majority units were given the same privileges which were to be given to the Hindu majority units. It was the only way in which both the Muslims and the Hindus could prosper in accordance with their respective cultural values. In his speech, he emphasised that unlike Christianity, Islam came with "legal concepts" with "civic significance," with its "religious ideals" considered as inseparable from social order: "therefore, the construction of a policy on national lines, if it means a displacement of the Islamic principle of solidarity, is simply unthinkable to a Muslim."

Iqbal thus stressed not only the need for the political unity of Muslim communities but the undesirability of blending the Muslim population into a wider society not based on Islamic principles. However, he would not elucidate or specify if his ideal Islamic state would construe a theocracy, even as he rejected secularism and nationalism. The latter part of Iqbal's life was concentrated on political activity. He would travel across Europe and West Asia to garner political and financial support for the League, and he reiterated his ideas in his 1932 address, and during the Third Round-Table Conference, he opposed the Congress and proposals for transfer of power without considerable autonomy or independence for Muslim provinces.

== History ==
The Hindu-Muslim question had great importance and stood crucial to British Indian history after 1857, especially in the 20th century. But the key issue for Muslims remained "separate identity." On several occasions and addresses, the issue gets highlighted that the Muslims are a separate nation with different culture and civilisation, interests and rights. The Two-Nation Theory was not accepted by the Muslims, Hindus and the British peoples because they believed in "territorial nationalism". The Congress' perspective of the Hindu-Muslim relationship was that any perceived rift was the product of British divide and rule policy. For Muslims it was the core issue as it related to their culture, civilisation, heritage and the type of arrangement that were to be ratified in the future political and constitutional arrangements of India.

The idea of a separate homeland was based on many issues, the first of which being a perceived decline and degeneration of Muslims. Most of the Muslim world became the colonies of European states, thus rendering the Industrial Revolution and development of science and technology a preserve of the European nations. More specific to the Muslims of South Asia was that that of being in a minority, thus lending greater impetus to the need for cultural preservation.

=== Phases of Development ===
==== 1st Phase: Pre-1905 ====
The first phase pertains to the pre-1905 period, before delivering the address Iqbal addresses the factors for the decline of the Muslims and he tries to focus on Indian nationality, nationhood or Indian unity. Iqbal explained about resolving differences in his book Bang-i-Dara and writes Tarānah-i-Hindī and Naya Shawala to reunite Muslims with Hindus.

==== 2nd Phase: The Stay in Europe 1905-08 ====
The second phase pertains the period from 1905 to 1908. Iqbal spent these years in Europe, during his higher education and in Germany at the Ludwig-Maximilians-Universität München for PhD. His stay in England helps to crystallise his ideas. Iqbal appreciated certain things in the West, for example, the quest for knowledge, their efforts for innovation and change. Iqbal was critical of materialism, capitalism and competition an unrestricted and unlimited competition that was undermining the society and it is during this period that he began to think philosophically and scientifically about the Muslims and he emphasised on the importance of spiritualism in one's life.

==== 3rd Phase: Return to India 1908 and onward ====
The third phase occurs when Iqbal comes back to India after his education. Here, his exclusive attention and focus were on the Muslim. He talked about the centrality of Islam, the question of submission to God, Oneness of God, He emphasised in his writings prose as well as poetry, and he discussed the Prophet Muhammad's role as the ideal leader as the leader that the Muslims should strive to follow. However, his focus was primarily on Muslims of the subcontinent when he dealt with the political or the constitutional issues of India. Iqbal was given the title of "Sir" in 1922 in recognition of his intellectual work. In 1927 Iqbal was elected to the Punjab Legislative Council, and thus served in the council for the next little over two years (from 1927 to 1930).

=== Revival of Islamic polity ===
Iqbal's six English lectures were published first from Lahore in 1930 and then by Oxford University Press in 1934 in a book titled The Reconstruction of Religious Thought in Islam. Which were read at Madras, Hyderabad and Aligarh. These lectures dwell on the role of Islam as a religion as well as a political and legal philosophy in the modern age. In these lectures Iqbal firmly rejects the political attitudes and conduct of Muslim politicians, whom he saw as morally misguided, attached to power and without any standing with Muslim masses.

Iqbal expressed fears that not only would secularism weaken the spiritual foundations of Islam and Muslim society, but that India's Hindu-majority population would crowd out Muslim heritage, culture and political influence. In his travels to Egypt, Afghanistan, Iran and Turkey, he promoted ideas of greater Islamic political co-operation and unity, calling for the shedding of nationalist differences. He also speculated on different political arrangements to guarantee Muslim political power; in a dialogue with Dr. B. R. Ambedkar, Iqbal expressed his desire to see Indian provinces as autonomous units under the direct control of the British government and with no central Indian government. He envisaged autonomous Muslim provinces in India. Under one Indian union, he feared for Muslims, who would suffer in many respects especially with regard to their existentially separate entity as Muslims. The Muslims of subcontinent were degraded both by British people and Hindus. After the advent of 1857, British people turn against Muslims thinking that they are only culprits and similarly Hindus want complete control over Muslims and they want to change constitution where Muslims should be suppressed and by not giving Muslims any importance. It was the cause due to which Iqbal presents his idea of uniting Muslims and Muslim majority areas such as Punjab, Sindh, Baluchistan and NWFP.

== Address 1930 ==
Iqbal was elected president of the Muslim League in 1930 at its session in Allahabad, in the United Provinces as well as for the session in Lahore in 1932. In his presidential address on 30 December 1930, Iqbal outlined a vision of an independent state for Muslim-majority provinces in northwestern India.

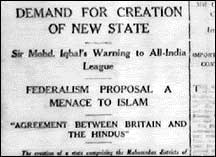
News clip reporting the landmark Allahabad session

=== The Address basis ===
In 1930 Iqbal delivered the Presidential Address the Allahabad Address, before address Iqbal also delivered landmark lectures on Islam in 1928 and 1929 in Aligarh, Hyderabad and Madras. Because Iqbal's address eye-plot was based on Islam. Iqbal's views on Islam and introversion with the modern conditions and modern situation helps him to generate the Allahabad Address. In 1932, Iqbal also presided over All India Conference that was held at Lahore and during that conference, he repeated some of the ideas and some of the thoughts which he had presented in his Address at 1930.

=== The Address outline ===
In his address, Iqbal called for the creation of "a Muslim India within India", especially in North-western India. Iqbal demanded the right of self-government for the Muslims. as he said:

India is a continent of human groups belonging to different races, speaking different languages, and professing different religions [...] Personally, I would like to see the Punjab, North-West Frontier Province, Sindh and Baluchistan amalgamated into a single State. Self-government within the British Empire, or without the British Empire, the formation of a consolidated North-West Indian Muslim State appears to me to be the final destiny of the Muslims, at least of North-West India.

Within his address, Iqbal also touched on his fear that Islam may have a similar fate as Christianity. "To Islam, matter is spirit realising itself in space and time" whereas Europe had "accepted the separation of Church and State and disliked the fact that their leaders were "indirectly forcing the world to accept it as unquestionable dogma [...] I do not know what will be the final fate of the national idea in the world of Islam. Whether Islam will assimilate and transform it as it has before assimilated and transformed many ideas expressive of a different spirit, or allow a radical transformation of its own structure by the force of this idea, is hard to predict. Professor Wensinck of Leiden (Holland) wrote to me the other day: "It seems to me that Islam is entering upon a crisis through which Christianity has been passing for more than a century. The great difficulty is how to save the foundations of religion when many antiquated notions have to be given up."

Iqbal spoke of:

The unity of an Indian nation, therefore, must be sought not in the negation, but in the mutual harmony and cooperation, of the many. True statesmanship cannot ignore facts, however unpleasant they may be [...] And it is on the discovery of Indian unity in this direction that the fate of India as well as of Asia really depends [...] If an effective principle of cooperation is discovered in India it will bring peace and mutual goodwill to this ancient land which has suffered so long [...] And it will at the same time solve the entire political problem of Asia.

In regards to the army, Iqbal stated:

Punjab with 56 percent Muslim population supplies 54 percent of the total combatant troops to the Indian Army, and if the 19,000 Gurkhas recruited from the independent State of Nepal are excluded, the Punjab contingent amounts to 62 percent of the whole Indian Army. This percentage does not take into account nearly 6,000 combatants supplied to the Indian Army by the North-West Frontier Province and Baluchistan. From this, you can easily calculate the possibilities of North-West Indian Muslims in regards to the defence of India against foreign aggression. Thus processing full opportunity of development within the body politic of India, the North-West Indian Muslims will prove the best defenders of India against a foreign invasion.

Iqbal also addresses how it was "painful to observe" the failed attempts to "discover such a principle of internal harmony". However, he still felt "hopeful". He expressed great concerns that the British politicians were "cleverly exploiting Hindu-Muslim differences regarding the ultimate form of Central Government" through Princes of the Princely States. He was also critical of the Simon Report that it did great "injustice to Muslims" to not be given a statutory majority for Punjab and Bengal. Furthermore, he demanded Sindh to be united with Baluchistan and turned into a separate province as it did not have anything in common with Bombay Presidency.

Comparing the European democracy to Indian democracy, he justified the Muslim demand for a "Muslim India within India", saying:

The principle of European democracy cannot be applied to India without recognizing the fact of communal groups. The Muslim demand for the creation of a Muslim India within India is, therefore, perfectly justified. The resolution of the All-Parties Muslim Conference at Delhi is, to my mind, wholly inspired by this noble ideal of a harmonious whole which, instead of stifling the respective individualities of its component wholes, affords them chances of fully working out the possibilities that may be latent in them. And I have no doubt that this House will emphatically endorse the Muslim demands embodied in this resolution.

Commenting on the Hindu fears of religious rule in the Muslim autonomous states, Iqbal said:

Muslim demand is not actuated by the kind of motive he imputes to us; it is actuated by a genuine desire for free development which is practically impossible under the type of unitary government contemplated by the nationalist Hindu politicians with a view to secure permanent command dominance in the whole of India. Nor should the Hindus fear that the creation of autonomous Muslim states will mean the introduction of a kind of religious rule in such states. I have already indicated to you the meaning of the word religion, as applied to Islam. The truth is that Islam is not a Church [...] I, therefore, demand the formation of a consolidated Muslim State in the best interests of India and Islam. For India, it means security and peace resulting from an internal balance of power; for Islam, an opportunity to rid itself of the stamp that Arabian Imperialism was forced to give it, to mobilize its law, its education, its culture, and to bring them into closer contact with its own original spirit and with the spirit of modern times.

In his concluding remarks, Iqbal said:

India demands complete organization and unity of will and purpose in the Muslim community, both in your own interest as a community and in the interest of India as a whole [...] We have a duty toward India where we are destined to live and die. We have a duty towards Asia, especially Muslim Asia. And since 70 millions of Muslims in single country constitute a far more valuable asset to Islam than all the countries of Muslim Asia put together, we must look at the Indian problem not only from the Muslim point of view but also from the standpoint of the Indian Muslim as such.

== Importance ==
Iqbal's address was known to have a forceful and logical presentation of the Muslim case in India. His address arises the awareness why should Muslims be treated as a political entity rather than a minority. His address highlights the following views that would prove highly beneficial in future.

- Territorial adjustments will enable the Muslims to develop themselves in accordance with their ideas and serve the cause of Ummah.
- Redistribution of territory developed later on the concept of a Muslim homeland.
- He further expressed these ideas in letters to Jinnah from May 1936 to November 1937. He talked of a separate federation of Muslim provinces. The North Western India and Bengal can be considered as entitled to self-determination like other nations in India and outside. Shariah's development is impossible without a free Muslim state or states. He advised the Muslims to be above self-interest and devote themselves to Islam.
- In difficult times, Islam has saved the Muslims.
- Faith, culture and historical traditions are more important than patriotism.

== See also ==
- Index of Muhammad Iqbal–related articles
- Islam in India
- Islam in Pakistan
- Islam in Bangladesh
- Islam in Egypt
- Islam in Russia
