= The Development of Metaphysics in Persia =

1908 book by Muhammad Iqbal

- Author: Muhammad Iqbal
- Genre: Philosophy, Metaphysics
- Publisher: Luzac & Company
- Publication date: 1908

The Development of Metaphysics in Persia is the book form of Muhammad Iqbal's PhD thesis in philosophy at LMU Munich submitted in 1908 and published in the same year. It traces the development of metaphysics in Persia from the time of Zoroaster to the advent of the Baháʼí Faith.

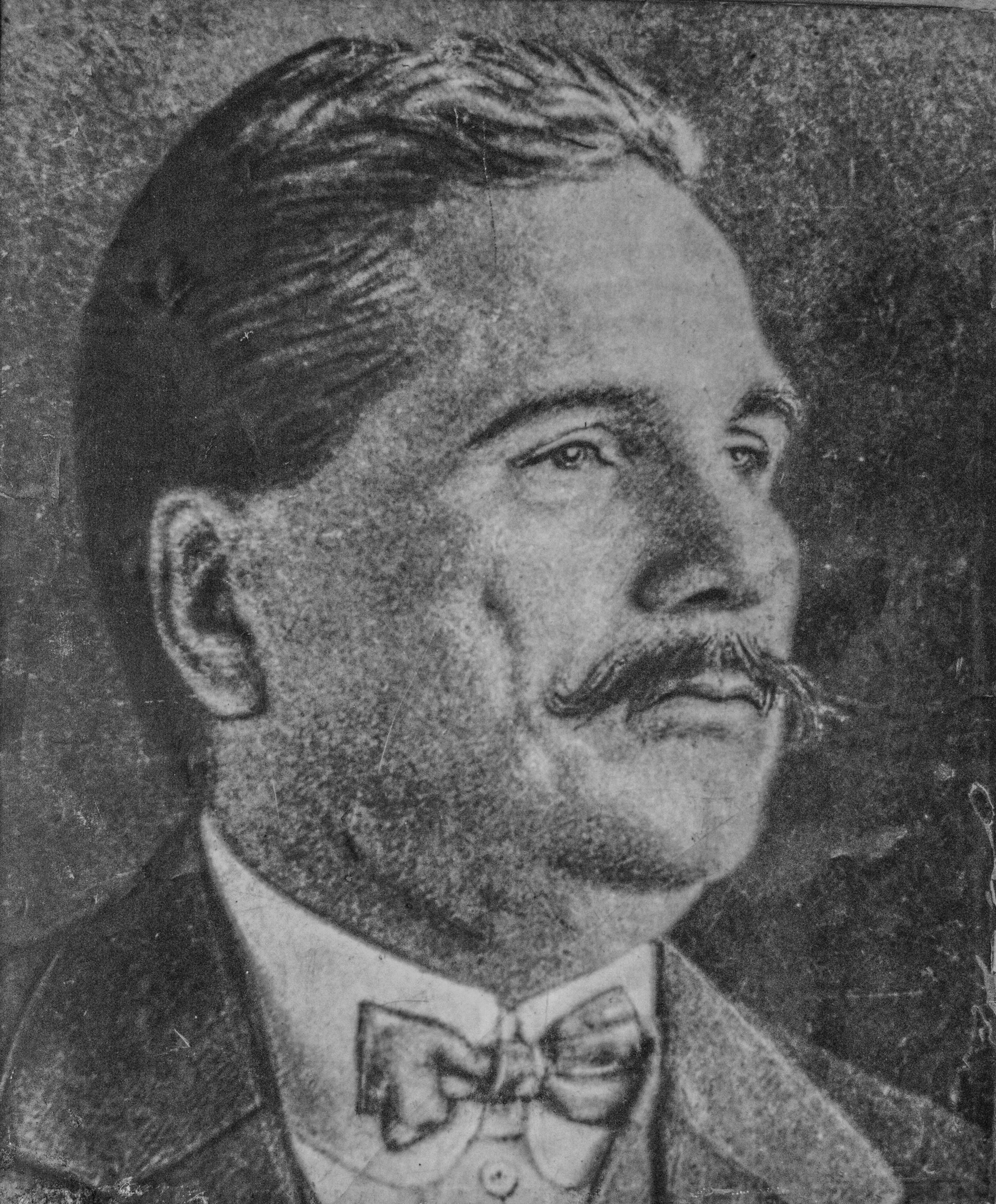
Allama Dr Muhammad Iqbal

== Introduction ==
Muhammad Iqbal went to Germany and enrolled at LMU Munich, Munich where he earned a PhD by submitting The Development of Metaphysics in Persia as his final thesis, in 1908. Iqbal's doctoral supervisor was Fritz Hommel. The book was published by Luzac & Company, London the same year. Iqbal covers the period from Zoroaster to the Bahá'u'lláh era and metaphysical anatomy.

== Quotes from the Book ==
"Owing to my ignorance of Zend, my knowledge of Zoroaster is merely second hand. As regards the second part of my work, I have been able to look up the original Persian and Arabic manuscripts as well as many printed works connected with my investigation. I give below the names of Arabic and Persian manuscripts from which I have drawn most of the material utilised here. The method of transliteration adopted is the one recognised by the Royal Asiatic Society."

== Editions ==
The first edition of the book was published by Luzac & Company, London in 1908. After that Bazm-e-Iqbal published it from Lahore in 1954. The book has been translated into many international languages including Persian, Urdu and Bosnian.

== See also ==
- Index of Muhammad Iqbal–related articles
