= Muhammad Iqbal =

Islamic philosopher and poet (1877–1938)

Allama Sir Muhammad Iqbal
- محمد اقبال
- Iqbal in 1931
- Born: 9 November 1877; Sialkot, Punjab, British India
- Died: 21 April 1938 (aged 60); Lahore, Punjab, British India
- Resting place: Mazar-e-Iqbal, Lahore
- Occupations: Philosopher; author; politician
- Office: Member of the Punjab Legislative Council (1927–1930)
- Spouse(s): Karim Bibi (m. 1893, separated) Sardar Begum (m. 1910; died 1935) Mukhtar Begum (m. 1914; died 1924)
- Children: 6

Education
- Education: Scotch Mission College (FA); Government College, Lahore (BA, MA); Trinity College, Cambridge (BA); Ludwig-Maximilians-Universität München (PhD)
- Thesis: The Development of Metaphysics in Persia (1908)
- Doctoral advisor: Fritz Hommel

Philosophical work
- Era: Colonial India
- Region: Punjab
- School: Islamic philosophy; idealism
- Institutions: Jamia Millia Islamia (co-founder)
- Language: Punjabi; Urdu; Persian; Arabic; English
- Main interests: Urdu literature; Persian poetry; Islamic history; Islamic revival; pan-Islamism
- Notable works: Bang-e-Dara, Tarana-e-Milli, The Secrets of the Self, The Secrets of Selflessness, Message from the East, Persian Psalms, Javid Nama, Sare Jahan se Accha
- Notable ideas: Allahabad Address (1930)

Sir Muhammad Iqbal (Note: Urdu: محمد اقبال, romanized: Muḥammad Iqbāl) (9 November 1877 – 21 April 1938) was an Islamic philosopher and poet. He is regarded as one of the most influential Urdu poets of the 20th century and his vision of a cultural and political ideal for the Muslims of British India is widely regarded as having animated the impulse behind the Pakistan Movement. The honorific commonly refers to him as Allama and is widely considered one of the most important and influential Muslim thinkers and Islamic religious philosophers of the 20th century.

Iqbal was born and raised in Sialkot, Punjab, British India and studied at Scotch Mission College in Sialkot and Government College University in Lahore. He taught Arabic at the Oriental College, Lahore, from 1899 until 1903, during which time he wrote prolifically. Notable among his Urdu poems from this period are "Parinde Ki Faryad" ("A Bird's Prayer"), an early contemplation on animal rights, and "Tarana-e-Hindi" ("Anthem of the Indians"), a patriotic poem—both composed for children. In 1905, he departed from India to pursue further education in Europe, first in England and later in Germany. In England, he earned a second BA at Trinity College, Cambridge, and subsequently qualified as a barrister at Lincoln's Inn. In Germany, he obtained a PhD in philosophy at the Ludwig-Maximilians-Universität München (LMU), with his thesis focusing on "The Development of Metaphysics in Persia" in 1908. Upon his return to Lahore in 1908, Iqbal established a law practice but primarily focused on producing scholarly works on politics, economics, history, philosophy, and religion. He is most renowned for his poetic compositions, including "Asrar-e-Khudi", "Rumuz-e-Bekhudi", and "Bang-e-Dara". His literary works in the Persian language garnered him recognition in Iran.

An ardent proponent of the political and spiritual revival of the Muslim world, particularly of the Muslims in the Indian subcontinent, the series of lectures Iqbal delivered to this effect were published as The Reconstruction of Religious Thought in Islam in 1930. He was elected to the Punjab Legislative Council in 1927 and held several positions in the All-India Muslim League. In his Allahabad Address, delivered at the League's annual assembly in 1930, he formulated a political framework for the Muslim-majority regions spanning northwestern India, spurring the League's pursuit of the two-nation theory.

In August 1947, nine years after Iqbal's death, the partition of India gave way to the establishment of Pakistan, a newly independent nation state in which Iqbal was honoured as the national poet. He is also known in Pakistani society as Hakim ul-Ummat (lit. 'The Wise Man of the Ummah') and as Mufakkir-e-Pakistan (lit. 'The Thinker of Pakistan'). The anniversary of his birth (Yaum-e Wiladat-e Muḥammad Iqbal), 9 November, is observed as a public holiday in Pakistan.

== Early life and family ==
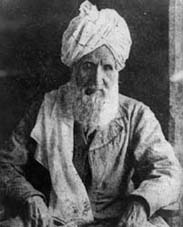
Sheikh Noor Muhammad, Iqbal's father

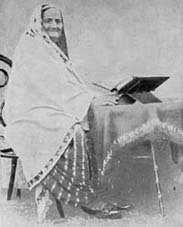
Imam Bibi, Iqbal's mother

Iqbal was born on 9 November 1877 in Sialkot, Punjab Province, British India (now in Pakistan). A Punjabi of Kashmiri ancestry, his family traced their ancestry back to the Sapru clan of Kashmiri Pandits who were from a south Kashmiri village in Kulgam and converted to Islam in the 15th-century. Iqbal's mother-tongue was Punjabi, and he conversed mostly in Punjabi and Urdu in his daily life. In the 19th century, when the Sikh Empire was conquering Kashmir, his grandfather's family migrated to Punjab. Iqbal's grandfather was an eighth cousin of Sir Tej Bahadur Sapru, an important lawyer and freedom fighter who would eventually become an admirer of Iqbal. Iqbal often mentioned and commemorated his Kashmiri lineage in his writings. According to scholar Annemarie Schimmel, Iqbal often wrote about his being "a son of Kashmiri-Brahmans but (being) acquainted with the wisdom of Rumi and Tabrizi".

Iqbal's father, Sheikh Noor Muhammad (died 1930), was a tailor, not formally educated, but a religious man. Iqbal's mother Imam Bibi, a Kashmiri from Sambrial, was described as a polite and humble woman who helped the poor and her neighbours with their problems. She died on 9 November 1914 in Sialkot. Iqbal loved his mother, and on her death he expressed his feelings of pathos in an elegy:

Who would wait for me anxiously in my native place?
Who would display restlessness if my letter fails to arrive?
I will visit thy grave with this complaint:
Who will now think of me in midnight prayers?
All thy life thy love served me with devotion—
When I became fit to serve thee, thou hast departed.

=== Early education ===
Iqbal was four years old when he was sent to a mosque to receive instruction in reading the Qur'an. He learned the Arabic and Persian languages from his teacher, Syed Mir Hassan, the head of the madrasa and professor of Arabic at Scotch Mission College in Sialkot, where he matriculated in 1893. He stood first in grade one and had started versifying under the pen-name of Iqbal while still in class nine, being published in literary journals as a teenager. He received an intermediate level with the Faculty of Arts diploma in 1895. The same year he enrolled at Government College, Lahore, where in 1897 he obtained his Bachelor of Arts degree in philosophy, English literature, and Arabic, and won the Khan Bahadurddin F.S. Jalaluddin medal for his performance in Arabic. In 1899, he received his Master of Arts degree from the same college and won first place in philosophy in the University of the Punjab.

=== Marriages ===
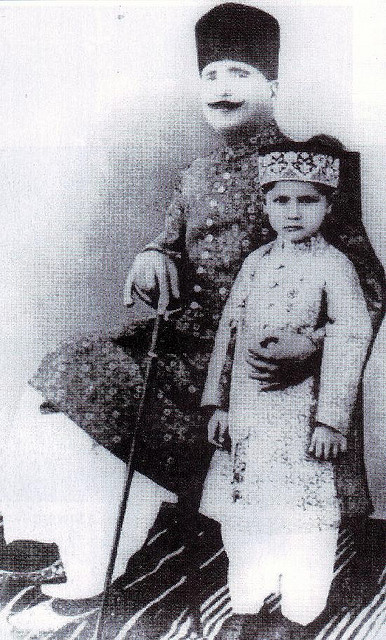
Muhammad Iqbal with his son Javed Iqbal in 1930

Iqbal married four times under different circumstances.

- His first marriage was in 1895 when he was 18 years old. His bride, Karim Bibi, was the daughter of Khan Bahadur Ata Muhammad Khan, a leading civil surgeon and fellow Punjabi-Kashmiri based in Gujrat. Her sister was the mother of director and music composer Khwaja Khurshid Anwar. Their families arranged the marriage, and the couple had two children; a daughter, Miraj Begum (1895–1915), and a son, Aftab Iqbal (1899–1979), who became a barrister. Aftab's son Azad Iqbal is himself a barrister as well a writer and musician, being a singer-composer in both jazz and ghazal genres. Another son is said to have died after birth in 1901.

Iqbal and Karim Bibi separated somewhere between 1910 and 1913. Despite this, he continued to financially support her till his death.

- Iqbal's second marriage took place on 26 August 1910 with the niece of Hakim Noor-ud-Din.
- Iqbal's third marriage was with Mukhtar Begum, and it was held in December 1914, shortly after the death of Iqbal's mother the previous November. They had a son, but both the mother and son died shortly after birth in 1924.
- Later, Iqbal married Sardar Begum, and they became the parents of a son, Javed Iqbal (1924–2015), who became Senior Justice of the Supreme Court of Pakistan, and a daughter, Muneera Bano (born 1930). One of Muneera's sons is the philanthropist-cum-socialite Yousuf Salahuddin.

=== Higher education in Europe ===
Iqbal was influenced by the teachings of Sir Thomas Arnold, his philosophy teacher at Government College Lahore, to pursue higher education in the West. In 1905, he travelled to England for that purpose, as Sir Thomas Arnold had advised him to specifically study neo-Hegelian philosophy and law at Cambridge. While already acquainted with Friedrich Nietzsche and Henri Bergson, Iqbal would discover Rumi slightly before his departure to England, and he would teach the Masnavi-e-Ma'navi to his friend Swami Rama Tirtha, who in return would teach him Sanskrit. Iqbal was awarded a scholarship at Trinity College, Cambridge, and in 1906 he graduated Bachelor of Arts there. In the same year, he was called to the bar as a barrister (or advocate) from Lincoln's Inn. In 1907, Iqbal moved to Germany to complete his doctoral studies under the supervision of Friedrich Hommel, and on 4 November 1907 he graduated as a Doctor of Philosophy from the Ludwig-Maximilians-Universität München (LMU) with a doctoral thesis entitled The Development of Metaphysics in Persia. This was published in London in 1908. Among his fellow students in Munich was Hans-Hasso von Veltheim, who later happened to visit Iqbal the day before Iqbal died.

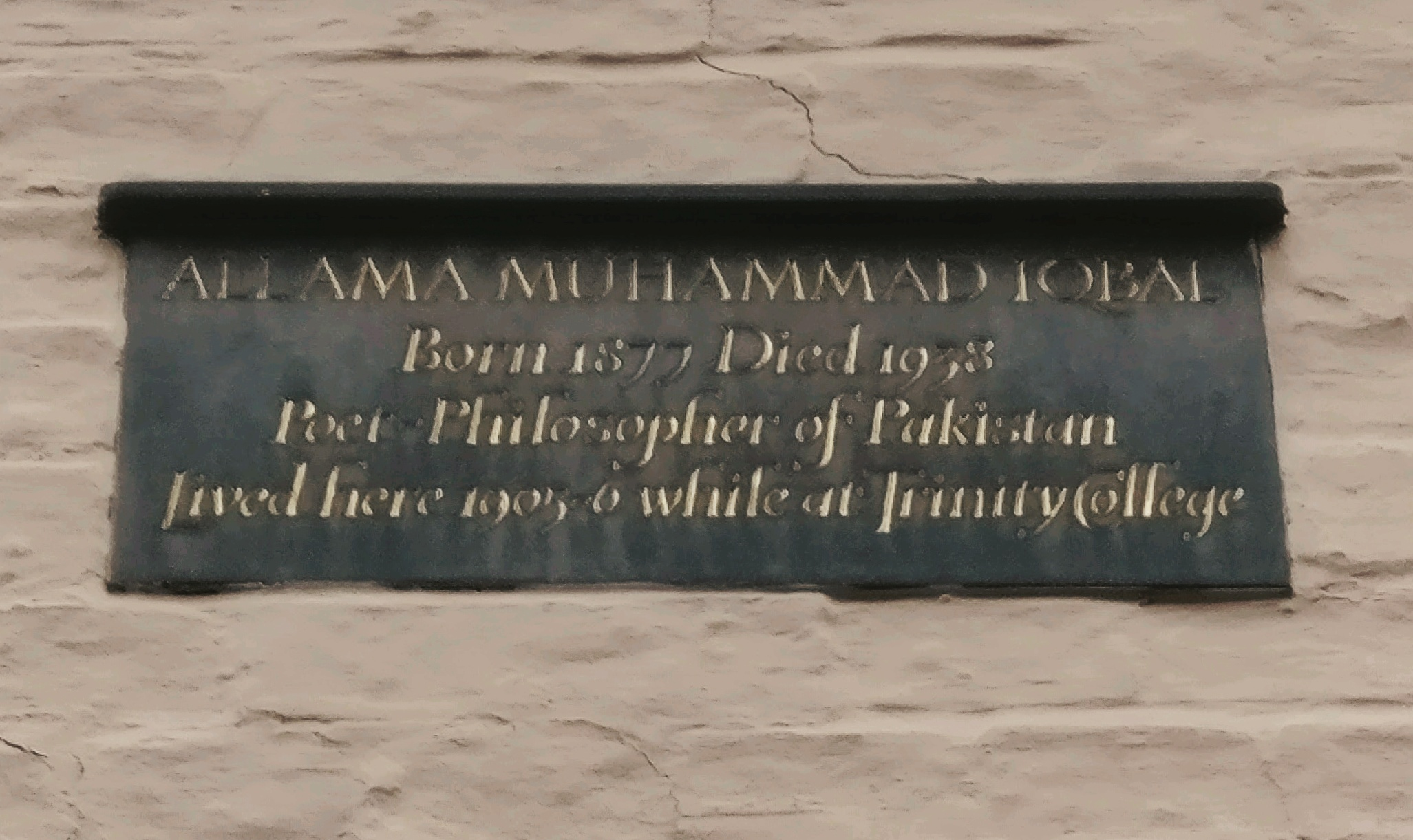
Plaque at Portugal Place, Cambridge, commemorating Iqbal's residence there during his time at Trinity College

In 1907, he had a close friendship with the writer Atiya Fyzee in both Britain and Germany. Atiya would later publish their correspondence. While Iqbal was in Heidelberg in 1907, his German professor Emma Wegenast taught him about Goethe's Faust, Heine and Nietzsche. He mastered German in three months. A street in Heidelberg has been named in his memory, "Iqbal Ufer". During his study in Europe, Iqbal began to write poetry in Persian. He preferred to write in this language because doing so made it easier to express his thoughts. He would write continuously in Persian throughout his life.

=== Academic career ===
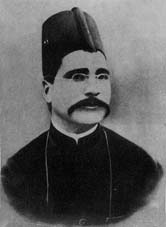
Photograph taken during Iqbal's youth in 1899

Iqbal began his career as a reader of Arabic after completing his Master of Arts degree in 1899, at Oriental College and shortly afterward was selected as a junior professor of philosophy at Government College Lahore, where he had also been a student in the past. He worked there until he left for England in 1905. In 1907 he went to Germany for PhD In 1908, he returned from Germany and joined the same college again as a professor of philosophy and English literature. In the same period Iqbal began practising law at the Chief Court of Lahore, but he soon quit law practice and devoted himself to literary works, becoming an active member of Anjuman-e-Himayat-e-Islam. In 1919, he became the general secretary of the same organization. Iqbal's thoughts in his work primarily focus on the spiritual direction and development of human society, centered around experiences from his travels and stays in Western Europe and the Middle East. He was profoundly influenced by Western philosophers such as Nietzsche, Bergson, and Goethe. He also closely worked with Ibrahim Hisham during his stay at the Aligarh Muslim University.

The poetry and philosophy of Rumi strongly influenced Iqbal. Deeply grounded in religion since childhood, Iqbal began concentrating intensely on the study of Islam, the culture and history of Islamic civilization and its political future, while embracing Rumi as "his guide". Iqbal's works focus on reminding his readers of the past glories of Islamic civilization and delivering the message of a pure, spiritual focus on Islam as a source for socio-political liberation and greatness. Iqbal denounced political divisions within and amongst Muslim nations, and frequently alluded to and spoke in terms of the global Muslim community or the Ummah.

Iqbal's poetry was translated into many European languages in the early part of the 20th century. Iqbal's Asrar-i-Khudi and Javed Nama were translated into English by R. A. Nicholson and A. J. Arberry, respectively. Upon the publication of Asrar-i-Khudi, Iqbal was honoured with a British knighthood.

=== Legal career ===
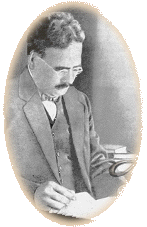
Iqbal as a barrister-at-law

Iqbal was not only a prolific writer but also a known advocate. He appeared before the Lahore High Court in both civil and criminal matters. There are more than 100 reported judgements to his name.

=== Final years and death ===
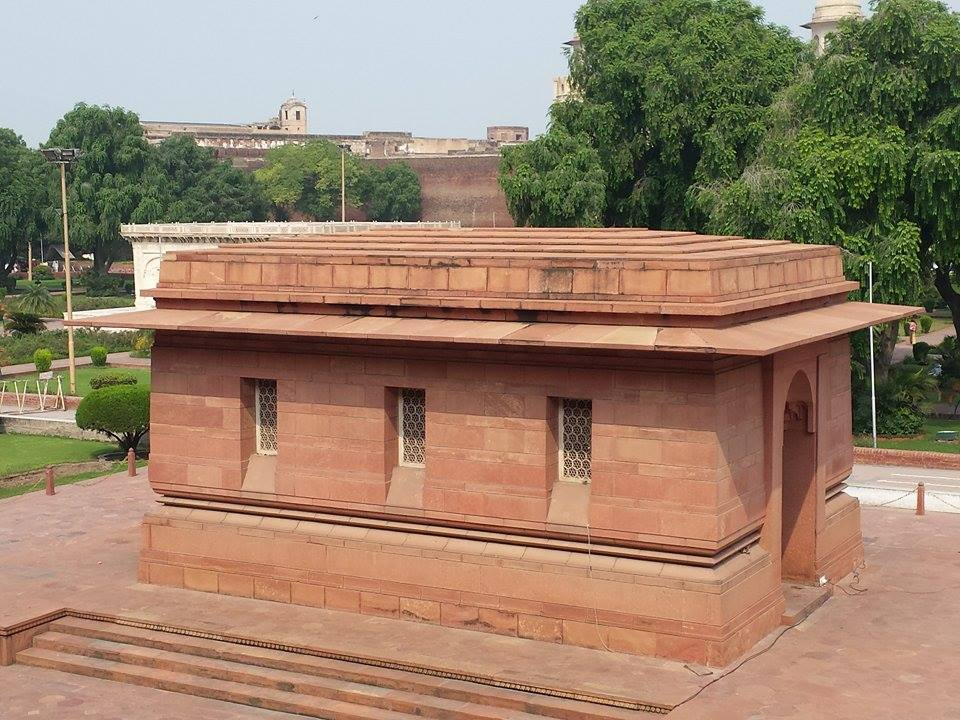
The tomb of Muhammad Iqbal at the entrance of the Badshahi Mosque in Lahore

In 1933, after returning from a trip to Spain and Afghanistan, Iqbal suffered from a mysterious throat illness. He spent his final years helping Chaudhry Niaz Ali Khan to establish the Dar ul Islam Trust Institute at a Jamalpur, Pakistan estate near Pathankot, where there were plans to subsidize studies in classical Islam and contemporary social science. He also advocated for an independent Muslim state. Iqbal ceased practising law in 1934 and was granted a pension by the Nawab of Bhopal. In his final years, he frequently visited the Dargah of famous Sufi Ali Hujwiri in Lahore for spiritual guidance. After suffering for months from his illness, Iqbal died in Lahore on 21 April 1938. It is maintained that he died listening to a kafi of Bulleh Shah. His tomb is located in Hazuri Bagh, the enclosed garden between the entrance of the Badshahi Mosque and the Lahore Fort, and official guards are provided by the Government of Pakistan.

== Efforts and influences ==
=== Political ===
Iqbal with Muslim politicians. (L to R): M. Iqbal (third), Syed Zafarul Hasan (sixth) at Aligarh Muslim University.

Iqbal first became interested in national affairs in his youth. He received considerable recognition from the Punjabi elite after his return from England in 1908, and he was closely associated with Mian Muhammad Shafi. When the All-India Muslim League was expanded to the provincial level, and Shafi received a significant role in the structural organization of the Punjab Muslim League, Iqbal was made one of the first three joint secretaries along with Shaikh Abdul Aziz and Maulvi Mahbub Alam. While dividing his time between law practice and poetry, Iqbal remained active in the Muslim League. He did not support Indian involvement in World War I and stayed in close touch with Muslim political leaders such as Mohammad Ali Jouhar and Muhammad Ali Jinnah. He was a critic of the mainstream Indian National Congress, which he regarded as dominated by Hindus, and was disappointed with the League when, during the 1920s, it was absorbed in factional divides between the pro-British group led by Shafi and the centrist group led by Jinnah. He was active in the Khilafat Movement, and was among the founding fathers of Jamia Millia Islamia which was established at Aligarh in October 1920. He was also given the offer of being the first vice-chancellor of Jamia Millia Islamia by Mahatma Gandhi, which he refused.

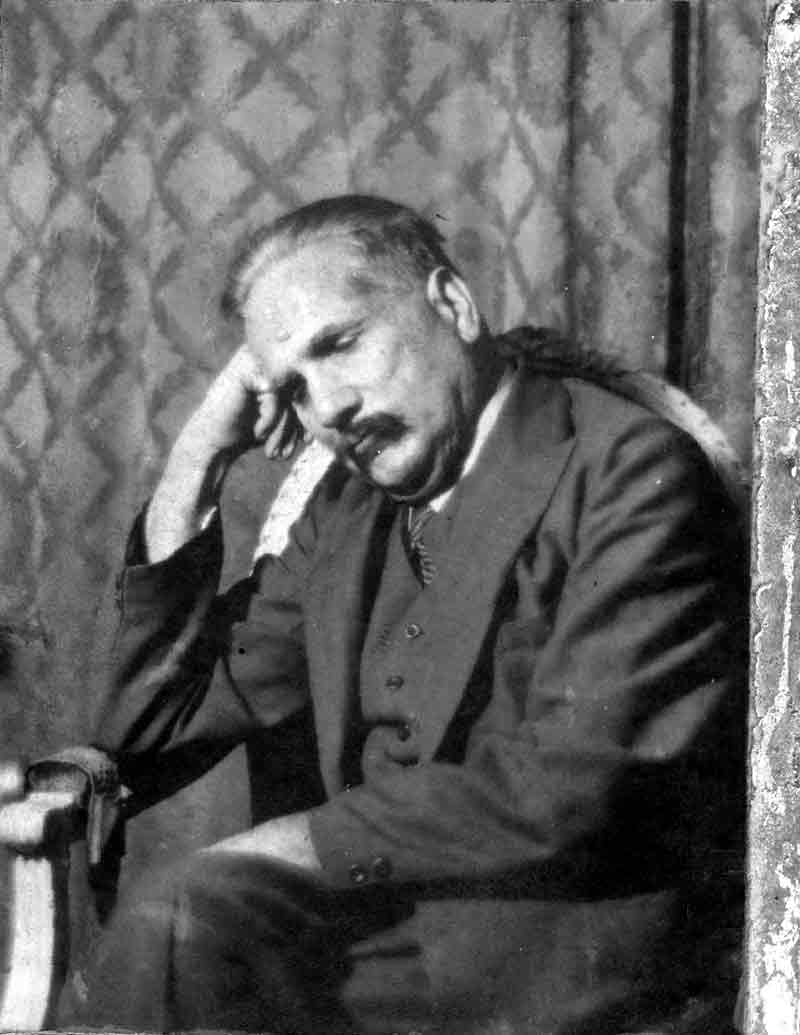
Muhammad Iqbal, then president of the Muslim League in 1930 and address deliverer

In November 1926, with the encouragement of friends and supporters, Iqbal contested the election for a seat in the Punjab Legislative Assembly from the Muslim district of Lahore, and defeated his opponent by a margin of 3,177 votes. He supported the constitutional proposals presented by Jinnah to guarantee Muslim political rights and influence in a coalition with the Congress and worked with the Aga Khan and other Muslim leaders to mend the factional divisions and achieve unity in the Muslim League. While in Lahore he was a friend of Abdul Sattar Ranjoor.

=== Iqbal, Jinnah, and the concept of "Pakistan" ===
Ideologically separated from Congress Muslim leaders, Iqbal had also been disillusioned with the politicians of the Muslim League, owing to the factional conflict that plagued the League in the 1920s. Discontented with factional leaders like Shafi and Fazl-ur-Rahman, Iqbal came to believe that only Jinnah was a political leader capable of preserving unity and fulfilling the League's objectives of Muslim political empowerment. Building a strong, personal correspondence with Jinnah, Iqbal was influential in convincing Jinnah to end his self-imposed exile in London, return to India and take charge of the League. Iqbal firmly believed that Jinnah was the only leader capable of drawing Indian Muslims to the League and maintaining party unity before the British and the Congress:

I know you are a busy man, but I do hope you won't mind my writing to you often, as you are the only Muslim in India today to whom the community has the right to look up to for safe guidance through the storm which is coming to North-West India and, perhaps, to the whole of India.

While Iqbal espoused the idea of Muslim-majority provinces in 1930, Jinnah would continue to hold talks with the Congress through the decade and only officially embraced the goal of Pakistan in 1940. Some historians postulate that Jinnah always remained hopeful for an agreement with the Congress and never fully desired the partition of India. Iqbal's close correspondence with Jinnah is speculated by some historians as having been responsible for Jinnah's embrace of the idea of Pakistan. Iqbal elucidated to Jinnah his vision of a separate Muslim state in a letter sent on 21 June 1937:

A separate federation of Muslim Provinces, reformed on the lines I have suggested above, is the only course by which we can secure a peaceful India and save Muslims from the domination of Non-Muslims. Why should not the Muslims of North-West India and Bengal be considered as nations entitled to self-determination just as other nations in India and outside India are.

Iqbal, serving as president of the Punjab Muslim League, criticized Jinnah's political actions, including a political agreement with Punjabi leader Sikandar Hyat Khan, whom Iqbal saw as a representative of feudal classes and not committed to Islam as the core political philosophy. Nevertheless, Iqbal worked constantly to encourage Muslim leaders and masses to support Jinnah and the League. Speaking about the political future of Muslims in India, Iqbal said:

There is only one way out. Muslims should strengthen Jinnah's hands. They should join the Muslim League. Indian question, as is now being solved, can be countered by our united front against both the Hindus and the English. Without it, our demands are not going to be accepted. People say our demands smack of communalism. This is sheer propaganda. These demands relate to the defense of our national existence. The united front can be formed under the leadership of the Muslim League. And the Muslim League can succeed only on account of Jinnah. Now, none but Jinnah is capable of leading the Muslims.

=== Madani–Iqbal debate ===
A famous debate was held between Iqbal and Hussain Ahmad Madani on the question of nationalism in the late 1930s. Madani's position throughout was to insist on the Islamic legitimacy of embracing a culturally plural, secular democracy as the best and the only realistic future for India's Muslims where Iqbal insisted on a religiously defined, homogeneous Muslim society. Madani and Iqbal both appreciated this point and they never advocated the creation of an absolute 'Islamic State'. They differed only in their first step. According to Madani the first step was the freedom of India for which composite nationalism was necessary. According to Iqbal the first step was the creation of a community of Muslims in the Muslim majority land, i.e. a Muslim India within India.

== Revival of Islamic policy ==
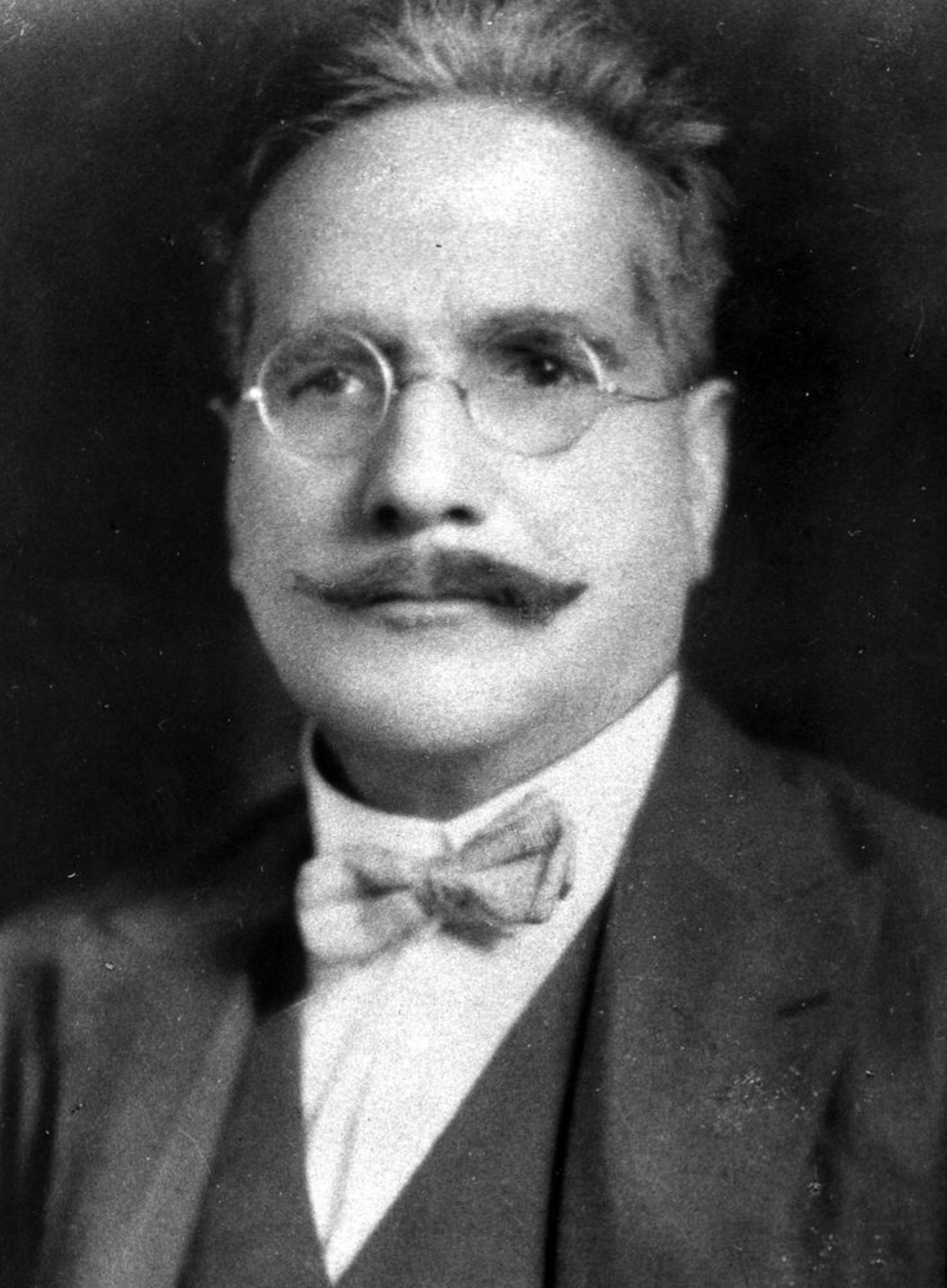
Iqbal in 1935

Iqbal's six English lectures were published in Lahore in 1930, and then by the Oxford University Press in 1934 in the book The Reconstruction of Religious Thought in Islam. The lectures had been delivered at Madras, Hyderabad and Aligarh. These lectures dwell on the role of Islam as a religion and as a political and legal philosophy in the modern age. In these lectures, Iqbal firmly rejects the political attitudes and conduct of Muslim politicians, whom he saw as morally misguided, attached to power and without any standing with the Muslim masses.

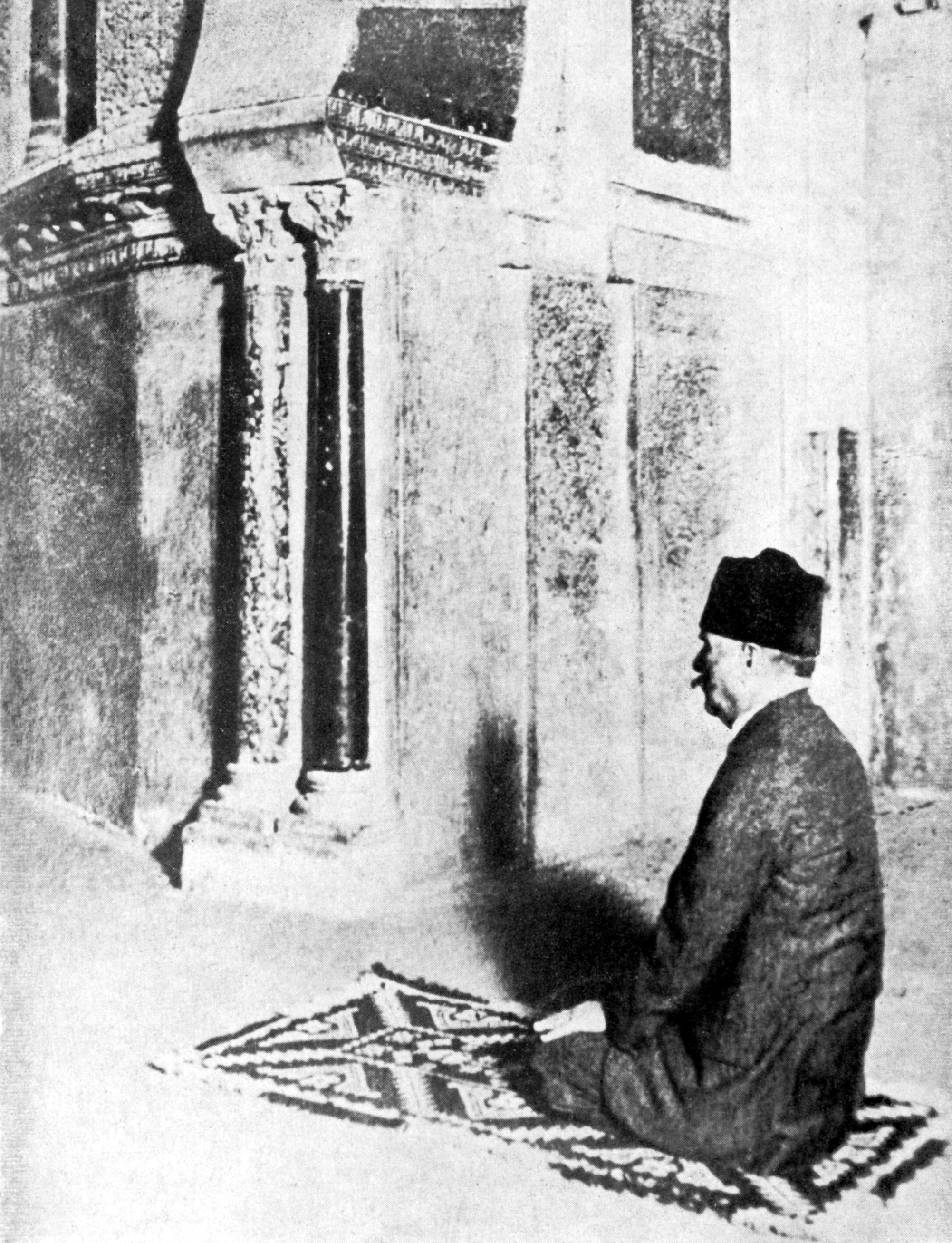
Iqbal praying at the Cordoba Mosque in Spain, 1933

Iqbal expressed fears that not only would secularism weaken the spiritual foundations of Islam and Muslim society but that India's Hindu-majority population would crowd out Muslim heritage, culture, and political influence. In his travels to Egypt, Afghanistan, Iran, and Turkey, he promoted ideas of greater Islamic political co-operation and unity, calling for the shedding of nationalist differences. He also speculated on different political arrangements to guarantee Muslim political power; in a dialogue with Dr. B. R. Ambedkar, Iqbal expressed his desire to see Indian provinces as autonomous units under the direct control of the British government and with no central Indian government. He envisaged autonomous Muslim regions in India. Under a single Indian union, he feared for Muslims, who would suffer in many respects, especially concerning their existentially separate entity as Muslims.

Iqbal was elected president of the Muslim League in 1930 at its session in Allahabad in the United Provinces, as well as for the session in Lahore in 1932. In his presidential address on 29 December 1930, he outlined a vision of an independent state for Muslim-majority provinces in north-western India:

I would like to see the Punjab, North-West Frontier Province, Sind and Baluchistan amalgamated into a single state. Self-government within the British Empire, or without the British Empire, the formation of a consolidated Northwest Indian Muslim state appears to me to be the final destiny of the Muslims, at least of Northwest India.

In his speech, Iqbal emphasised that, unlike Christianity, Islam came with "legal concepts" with "civic significance", with its "religious ideals" considered as inseparable from social order: "Therefore, if it means a displacement of the Islamic principle of solidarity, the construction of a policy on national lines, is simply unthinkable to a Muslim." Iqbal thus stressed not only the need for the political unity of Muslim communities but the undesirability of blending the Muslim population into a wider society not based on Islamic principles.

Even as he rejected secularism and nationalism he would not elucidate or specify if his ideal Islamic state would be a theocracy, and criticized the "intellectual attitudes" of Islamic scholars (ulema) as having "reduced the Law of Islam practically to the state of immobility".

The latter part of Iqbal's life was concentrated on political activity. He travelled across Europe and West Asia to garner political and financial support for the League. He reiterated the ideas of his 1932 address, and, during the third Round Table Conference, he opposed the Congress and proposals for transfer of power without considerable autonomy for Muslim provinces.

He would serve as president of the Punjab Muslim League, and would deliver speeches and publish articles in an attempt to rally Muslims across India as a single political entity. Iqbal consistently criticised feudal classes in Punjab as well as Muslim politicians opposed to the League. Many accounts of Iqbal's frustration toward Congress leadership were also pivotal in providing a vision for the two-nation theory.

=== Patron of Tolu-e-Islam ===
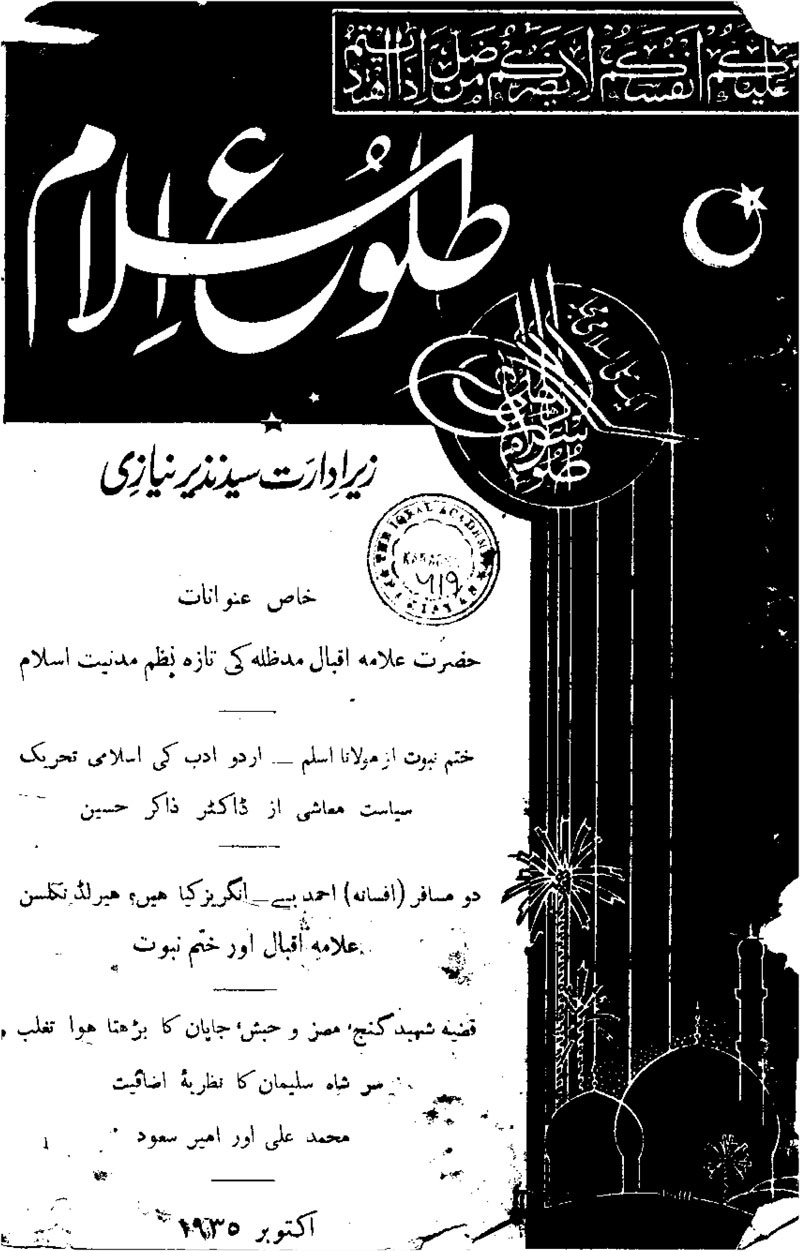
Copy of the first issue of Tolu-e-Islam

Iqbal was the first patron of Tolu-e-Islam, an historical, political, religious and cultural journal of the Muslims of British India. For a long time, Iqbal wanted a journal to propagate his ideas and the aims and objectives of the All India Muslim League. In 1935, according to his instructions, Syed Nazeer Niazi initiated and edited the journal, named after Iqbal's poem "Tulu'i Islam". Niazi dedicated the first issue of the journal to Iqbal. The journal would play an important role in the Pakistan movement. Later, the journal was continued by Ghulam Ahmed Pervez, who had contributed many articles in its early editions.

== Literary work ==
=== Persian ===
Iqbal's poetic works are written primarily in Persian rather than Urdu. Among his 12,000 verses of poetry, about 7,000 verses are in Persian. In 1915, he published his first collection of poetry, the Asrar-i-Khudi اسرارِ خودی (Secrets of the Self) in Persian, for which he was honoured with a British knighthood upon its publication. The poems emphasise the spirit and self from a religious perspective. Many critics have called this Iqbal's finest poetic work. In Asrar-i-Khudi, Iqbal explains his philosophy of "Khudi", or "Self". Iqbal's use of the term "Khudi" is synonymous with the word "Rooh" used in the Quran for a divine spark which is present in every human being, and was said by Iqbal to be present in Adam, for which God ordered all of the angels to prostrate in front of Adam. Iqbal condemns self-destruction. For him, the aim of life is self-realisation and self-knowledge. He charts the stages through which the "Self" has to pass before finally arriving at its point of perfection, enabling the knower of the "Self" to become a vice-regent of God. When Asrar-i-Khudi was published, its first appearance is said to have taken the younger generation of Hindustani Muslims by storm. 'Iqbal has come amongst us as a Messiah and stirred the dead into life', so wrote Reynold Alleyne Nicholson, whose prose version and translation of the work first introduced Iqbal's writings to the Western public. The book is divided into eighteen chapters. Several of these attempt to explain the Self, and its relationship with the universe and the creation of God - placing the sacred nature of man at the centre of existence. Two of the chapters cover the importance of devotion and love on the Self:

When the Self is made strong by Love
It rules the whole world from above
Even the Sage who adorned the night skies
Plucks celestial buds from the Self’s sighs
Its hand becomes God’s Hand
The moon is split by the Self’s command
The Self is the judge of all worldly disputes
Its decree even Darius and Jamshid cannot refuse

The remaining chapters go on to enforce further moral and religious ethical lessons through the use of parables, symbols and examples. He uses opposites to draw clear distinctions between the polished Self and the lost, egotistical and hypocritical nature of the Self. In chapter thirteen, Iqbal creates a dialogue between a diamond and a coal, and in chapter fourteen, the Sheikh and a Brahman are brought together, as well as the Ganges and the Himalaya. In one of the longest chapters, ‘On the true nature of poetry and the reformation of Islamic literature, Iqbal expresses significant reservations about poetry, and his own role as a poet. In a letter dated 1936, two years before his death, he writes: ‘I do not consider myself a poet. If I am presented in this role, I feel embarrassed. My ancestors belonged to the Sapru family of Kashmiri Brahmins who never composed poetry. I have no aptitude for music and painting either. Unfortunately, I had to take refuge in poetry to express my thoughts. Perhaps I would have been more successful in another field. In his book The Reconstruction of Religious Thought in Islam, he is openly critical of poetry that served only decorative or escapist purposes. He saw much of contemporary poetry, as well as classical, Persian and Urdu poetry, as promoting fatalism, passivity, and mythical escapism, which were antithetical to his philosophy of ‘Khudi’ (Selfhood). He believed true art should have a higher purpose. In this sense, he was against poetry as mere entertainment or idle ornamentation. In the introduction to the Secrets of the Self, he writes:

Mere poetry is not the aim of this Masnavi
Nor devotion to beauty, or love’s fanatic ecstasy
I am of Hind, Persian is not native to me
I am like the crescent moon, my cup is not full, you see
Do not seek from me wit and a charming tongue
Do not seek from me Khansar and Isfahan
Though Urdu is refined and sweet
The sweetness of Persian it cannot beat
Its wondrous beauty enchanted my mind
Out of the Burning Bush my pen was designed
In such high places are my ideas caught
That Persian alone captures my thoughts

In his Rumuz-i-Bekhudi رموزِ بیخودی (Hints of Selflessness), Iqbal seeks to prove the Islamic way of life is the best code of conduct for a nation's viability. A person must keep his characteristics intact, he asserts, but once this is achieved, he should sacrifice his ambitions for the needs of the nation. Man cannot realise the "Self" outside of society. Published in 1917, this group of poems has as its main themes the ideal community, Islamic ethical and social principles, and the relationship between the individual and society. Although he supports Islam, Iqbal also recognises the positive aspects of other religions. Rumuz-i-Bekhudi complements the emphasis on the self in Asrar-e-Khudi, and the two collections are often put in the same volume under the title Asrar-i-Rumuz (Hinting Secrets). It is addressed to the world's Muslims.

Iqbal's 1924 publication, the Payam-e-Mashriq پیامِ مشرق (The Message of the East), is closely connected to the West-östlicher Diwan by the German poet Goethe. Goethe bemoans the West having become too materialistic in outlook, and expects the East to provide a message of hope to resuscitate spiritual values. Iqbal styles his work as a reminder to the West of the importance of morality, religion, and civilisation by underlining the need for cultivating feeling, ardour, and dynamism. He asserts that an individual can never aspire to higher dimensions unless he learns of the nature of spirituality. In his first visit to Afghanistan, he presented Payam-e Mashreq to King Amanullah Khan. In it, he admired the uprising of Afghanistan against the British Empire. In 1933, he was officially invited to Afghanistan to join the meetings regarding the establishment of Kabul University.

The Zabur-e-Ajam زبورِ عجم (Persian Psalms), published in 1927, includes the poems "Gulshan-e-Raz-e-Jadeed" ("Garden of New Secrets") and "Bandagi Nama" ("Book of Slavery"). In "Gulshan-e-Raz-e-Jadeed", Iqbal first poses questions, then answers them with the help of ancient and modern insight. "Bandagi Nama" denounces slavery and attempts to explain the spirit behind the fine arts of enslaved societies. Here, as in other books, Iqbal insists on remembering the past, doing well in the present and preparing for the future, while emphasising love, enthusiasm and energy to fulfil the ideal life.

Iqbal's 1932 work, the Javed Nama جاوید نامہ (Book of Javed), is named after and in a manner addressed to his son, who is featured in the poems. It follows the examples of the works of Ibn Arabi and Dante's The Divine Comedy, through mystical and exaggerated depictions across time. Iqbal depicts himself as Zinda Rud ("A stream full of life") guided by Rumi, "the master", through various heavens and spheres and has the honour of approaching divinity and coming in contact with divine illuminations. In a passage reliving a historical period, Iqbal condemns the Muslims who were instrumental in the defeat and death of Nawab Siraj-ud-Daula of Bengal and Tipu Sultan of Mysore by betraying them for the benefit of the British colonists, and thus delivering their country to the shackles of slavery. In the end, by addressing his son Javed, he speaks to the young people at large and guides the "new generation".

Pas Chih Bayed Kard Ay Aqwam-e-Sharq پس چہ باید کرد اے اقوامِ شرق includes the poem "Musafir" مسافر ("The Traveller"). Again, Iqbal depicts Rumi as a character and gives an exposition of the mysteries of Islamic law and Sufi perceptions. Iqbal laments the dissension and disunity among the Indian Muslims as well as Muslim nations. "Musafir" is an account of one of Iqbal's journeys to Afghanistan, in which the Pashtun people are counselled to learn the "secret of Islam" and to "build up the self" within themselves.

His love of the Persian language is evident in his works and poetry. He says in one of his poems:

گرچه هندی در عذوبت شکر است

garči Hindī dar 'uẕūbat šakkar ast

طرز گفتار دری شیرین‌تر است

tarz-i guftār-i Darī šīrēn-tar ast

This can be translated as:

Even though in euphonious Hindi (Note: lit. 'language of India'. Not to be confused with Modern Standard Hindi; in fact, in this case, it's an archaic name used for Rekhta/Urdu.) is sugar –
(But) the rhyme method in Dari (Note: lit. 'the courtly language'. Here, not referring to the variety of Persian used in Afghanistan.) is sweeter.

'Uẕūbat usually means 'bliss', 'delight', 'sweetness'; in language, literature and poetry, 'uẕūbat also means 'euphonious' or 'melodic'.

Throughout his life, Iqbal preferred writing in Persian as he believed it allowed him to fully express philosophical concepts, and it gave him a wider audience.

=== Urdu ===
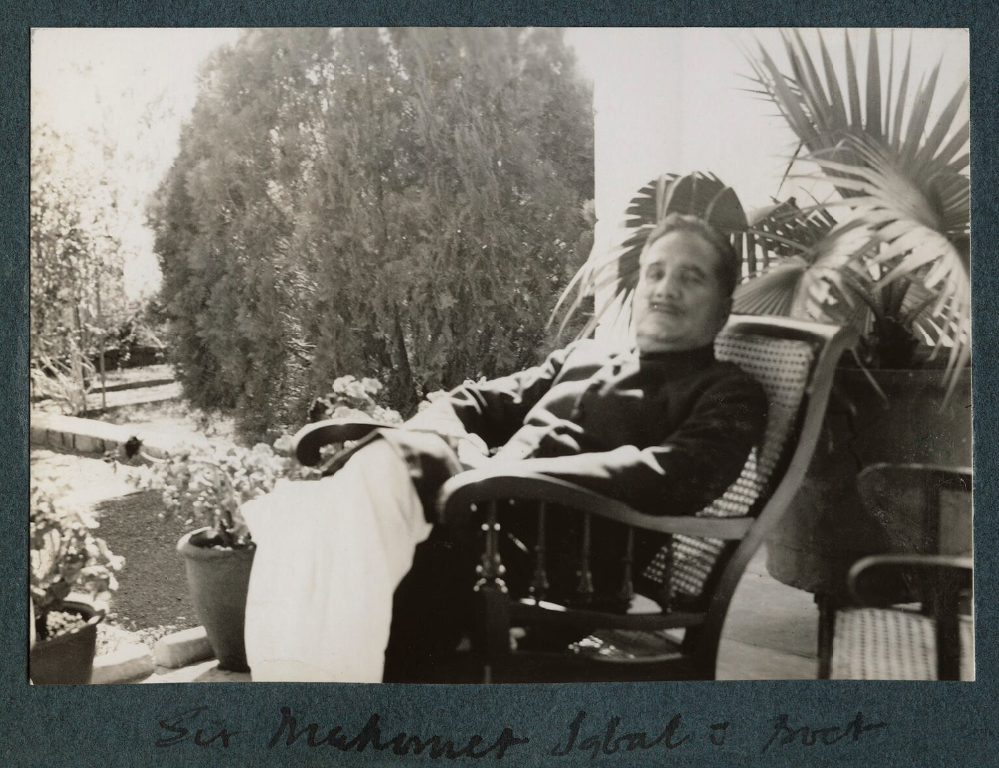
Sir Muhammad Iqbal in 1935, by Lady Ottoline Morrell

Muhammad Iqbal's The Call of the Marching Bell (بانگِ درا, bang-e-dara), his first collection of Urdu poetry, was published in 1924. It was written in three distinct phases of his life. The poems he wrote up to 1905—the year he left for England—reflect patriotism and the imagery of nature, including the Urdu language patriotic "Saare Jahan se Accha". The second set of poems date from 1905 to 1908, when Iqbal studied in Europe, and dwell upon the nature of European society, which he emphasised had lost spiritual and religious values. This inspired Iqbal to write poems on the historical and cultural heritage of Islam and the Muslim community, with a global perspective. Iqbal urges the entire Muslim community, addressed as the Ummah, to define personal, social and political existence by the values and teachings of Islam.

Iqbal's works were in Persian for most of his career, but after 1930 his works were mainly in Urdu. His works in this period were often specifically directed at the Muslim masses of India, with an even stronger emphasis on Islam and Muslim spiritual and political reawakening. Published in 1935, Bal-e-Jibril بالِ جبریل (Wings of Gabriel) is considered by many critics as his finest Urdu poetry and was inspired by his visit to Spain, where he visited the monuments and legacy of the kingdom of the Moors. It consists of ghazals, miscellaneous poems, quatrains and epigrams and carries a strong sense of religious passion.

Zarb-i-Kalim ضربِ کلیم (or The Rod of Moses) is another book of philosophical poetry by Allama Iqbal in Urdu published in 1936, two years before his death, which he described as his political manifesto. It was published with the subtitle "A Declaration of War Against the Present Times". Muhammad Iqbal argues that modern problems are due to the godlessness, materialism, and injustice of modern civilization, which feeds on the subjugation and exploitation of weak nations, especially the Indian Muslims.

Iqbal's final work was Armughan-e-Hijaz ارمغانِ حجاز (The Gift of Hijaz), published posthumously in 1938. The first part contains quatrains in Persian, and the second part contains some poems and epigrams in Urdu. The Persian quatrains convey the impression that the poet is travelling through the Hijaz in his imagination. The profundity of ideas and intensity of passion are the salient features of these short poems.

Iqbal's vision of mystical experience is clear in one of his Urdu ghazals, which was written in London during his student days. Some verses of that ghazal are:

At last, the silent tongue of Hijaz has
announced to the ardent ear the tiding
That the covenant which had been given to the
desert-[dwellers] is going to be renewed
vigorously:
The lion who had emerged from the desert and
had toppled the Roman Empire is
As I am told by the angels, about to get up
again (from his slumbers.)
You the [dwellers] of the West, should know that
the world of God is not a shop (of yours).
Your imagined pure gold is about to lose its
standard value (as fixed by you).
Your civilization will commit suicide with its
own daggers.
For a house built on a fragile bark of wood is not longlasting

In Bang-e-Dra, a ghazal titled "Tere Ishq Ki Intiha Chahta Hoon" (Completion of Your Love is What I Desire):

Completion of Your Love is what I desire
Look at my sincerity, what little I desire
It may be oppression or the promise of unveiling
Something testing my perseverance I desire
May the pious be happy with this paradise
To be in Your company, that’s all I desire
Though I am but a small heart, I exhibit such boldness
To hear the same, ‘I cannot be seen’1 I desire
O assembly’s companions! I exist for a speck
I am the dawn’s candle, I am about to be extinguished
I have divulged the secret to the packed assembly
I am very insolent; punishment I desire.

=== English ===
Iqbal wrote two books, The Development of Metaphysics in Persia (1908) and The Reconstruction of Religious Thought in Islam (1930), and many letters in the English language. He also wrote a book on Economics that is now rare. In these, he revealed his thoughts regarding Persian ideology and Islamic Sufism – in particular, his beliefs that Islamic Sufism activates the searching soul to a superior perception of life. He also discussed philosophy, God and the meaning of prayer, human spirit and Muslim culture, as well as other political, social and religious problems.

Iqbal was invited to Cambridge to participate in a conference in 1931, where he expressed his views, including those on the separation of church and state, to students and other participants:

I would like to offer a few pieces of advice to the young men who are at present studying at Cambridge. ... I advise you to guard against atheism and materialism. The biggest blunder made by Europe was the separation of Church and State. This deprived their culture of moral soul and diverted it to atheistic materialism. I had twenty-five years ago seen through the drawbacks of this civilization and, therefore, had made some prophecies. They had been delivered by my tongue, although I did not quite understand them. This happened in 1907. ... After six or seven years, my prophecies came true, word by word. The European war of 1914 was an outcome of the mistakes mentioned above made by the European nations in the separation of the Church and the State.

=== Punjabi ===
Iqbal also wrote some poems in Punjabi, such as "Piyaara Jedi" and "Baba Bakri Wala", which he penned in 1929 on the occasion of his son Javed's birthday. A collection of his Punjabi poetry was put on display in 2016 at the Iqbal Manzil in Sialkot.

Iqbal was deeply influenced by Punjabi Sufis. Once a comrade recited a poem by Bulleh Shah and he was "so much touched and overwhelmed ... that tears rolled down his cheeks".

== Modern reputation ==
=== "Poet of the East" ===
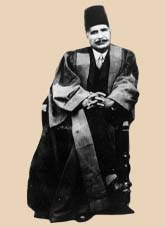
Iqbal after the conferment of a Doctorate of Literature by the University of the Punjab in 1933

Iqbal has been referred to as the "Poet of the East" by academics, institutions and the media. He is often known by the title "Allama" within Pakistan.

The Vice-Chancellor of Quaid-e-Azam University, Dr. Masoom Yasinzai, stated in a seminar addressing a distinguished gathering of educators and intellectuals that Iqbal is not only a poet of the East but is a universal poet. Moreover, Iqbal is not restricted to any specific segment of the world community, but he is for all humanity.

Yet it should also be borne in mind that while dedicating his Eastern Divan to Goethe, the cultural icon par excellence, Iqbal's Payam-i-Mashriq constituted both a reply as well as a corrective to the Western Divan of Goethe. For by stylizing himself as the representative of the East, Iqbal endeavored to talk on equal terms to Goethe as the representative of West.

Iqbal's revolutionary works through his poetry affected the Muslims of the subcontinent. Iqbal thought that Muslims had long been suppressed by the colonial enlargement and growth of the West. For this concept, Iqbal is recognized as the "Poet of the East".

So to conclude, let me cite Annemarie Schimmel in Gabriel's Wing who lauds Iqbal's "unique way of weaving a grand tapestry of thought from eastern and western yarns" (p. xv), a creative activity which, to cite my own volume Revisioning Iqbal, endows Muhammad Iqbal with the stature of a "universalist poet" and thinker whose principal aim was to explore mitigating alternative discourses to construct a bridge between the "East" and the "West".

The Urdu world is very familiar with Iqbal as the "Poet of the East". Iqbal is also called Muffakir-e-Pakistan ("The Thinker of Pakistan") and Hakeem-ul-Ummat ("The Sage of the Ummah"). The Pakistan government officially named him Pakistan's "national poet".

=== Iran ===
In Iran, Iqbal is known as Iqbāl-e Lāhorī (Persian: اقبال لاهوری) (Iqbal of Lahore). Iqbal's Asrare-i-Khudi and Bal-i-Jibreel are particularly popular in Iran. At the same time, many scholars in Iran have recognized the importance of Iqbal's poetry in inspiring and sustaining the Iranian Revolution of 1979. During the early phases of the revolutionary movement, it was common to see people gathering in a park or corner to listen to someone reciting Iqbal's Persian poetry, which is why people of all ages in Iran today are familiar with at least some of his poetry, notably Zabur-i-Ajam.

Former Iranian supreme leader Ali Khamenei had stated: "We have a large number of non-Persian-speaking poets in the history of our literature, but I cannot point out any of them whose poetry possesses the qualities of Iqbal's Persian poetry. Iqbal was not acquainted with Persian idiom, as he spoke Urdu at home and talked to his friends in Urdu or English. He did not know the rules of Persian prose writing. [...] In spite of not having tasted the Persian way of life, never living in the cradle of Persian culture, and never having any direct association with it, he cast with great mastery the most delicate, the most subtle and radically new philosophical themes into the mould of Persian poetry, some of which are unsurpassable yet."

By the early 1950s, Iqbal became known among the intelligentsia of Iran. Iranian poet laureate Muhammad Taqi Bahar universalized Iqbal in Iran. He highly praised the work of Iqbal in Persian.

In 1952, Iranian Prime Minister Mohammad Mossadeq, a national hero because of his oil nationalization policy, broadcast a special radio message on Iqbal Day and praised his role in the struggle of the Indian Muslims against British imperialism. At the end of the 1950s, Iranians published the complete Persian works. In the 1960s, Iqbal's thesis on Persian philosophy was translated from English to Persian. Ali Shariati, a Sorbonne-educated sociologist, supported Iqbal as his role model as Iqbal had Rumi. An example of the admiration and appreciation of Iran for Iqbal is that he received a place of honour in the pantheon of the Persian elegy writers.

Iqbal became even more popular in Iran in the 1970s. His verses appeared on banners, and his poetry was recited at meetings of intellectuals. Iqbal inspired many intellectuals, including Ali Shariati, Mehdi Bazargan and Abdulkarim Soroush. His book The Reconstruction of Religious Thought in Islam was translated by Mohammad Masud Noruzi.

Key Iranian thinkers and leaders who were influenced by Iqbal's poetry during the rise of the Iranian revolution include Khamenei, Shariati and Soroush, although much of the revolutionary guard was familiar with Iqbal's poetry. At the inauguration of the First Iqbal Summit in Tehran (1986), Khamenei stated that in its "conviction that the Quran and Islam are to be made the basis of all revolutions and movements", Iran was "exactly following the path that was shown to us by Iqbal". Shariati, who has been described as a core ideologue for the Iranian Revolution, described Iqbal as a figure who brought a message of "rejuvenation", "awakening" and "power" to the Muslim world.

More recent admirers of Iqbal from Iran include former President Mahmoud Ahmadinejad and Gholam-Ali Haddad-Adel, a former Speaker of Parliament and writer.

=== Turkey ===
Mehmet Akif Ersoy, considered the national poet of Turkey for having composed its national anthem, was directly influenced by Iqbal.

In 2016, Turkey's Minister for Culture and Tourism Nabi Avcı presented the Dost Award to Walid Iqbal, the grandson of Iqbal, in order to honour Iqbal's "services to Islam", the ceremony being held in Konya, the resting place of Rumi.

=== Indonesia ===
Amongst the admirers of Iqbal was Indonesian revolutionary and president Sukarno who considered Iqbal "a hero of philosophy, literature, and religion".

Numerous religious and political figures of Indonesia have been impacted by Iqbal, including Mohammad Natsir, who had served as the country's prime minister and who, in a speech, honoured Iqbal as a pivotal figure in Islamic intellectual history who rejuvenated Muslim self-consciousness through poetic and philosophical works. He emphasises Iqbal’s concept of khudi (selfhood) and how Iqbal critiqued the separation of religion and state, his opposition to Western materialism, capitalism, socialism, and his advocacy for an Islamic state grounded in spiritual values.

=== Arab world ===
Iqbal has an audience in the Arab world, and in Egypt one of his poems has been sung by Umm Kulthum, the most famous modern Egyptian artist, while among his modern admirers there are influential literary figures such as Farouk Shousha. In Saudi Arabia, among the important personalities who were influenced by Iqbal there was Abdullah bin Faisal Al Saud, a member of the Saudi royal family and himself a poet.

=== Western countries ===
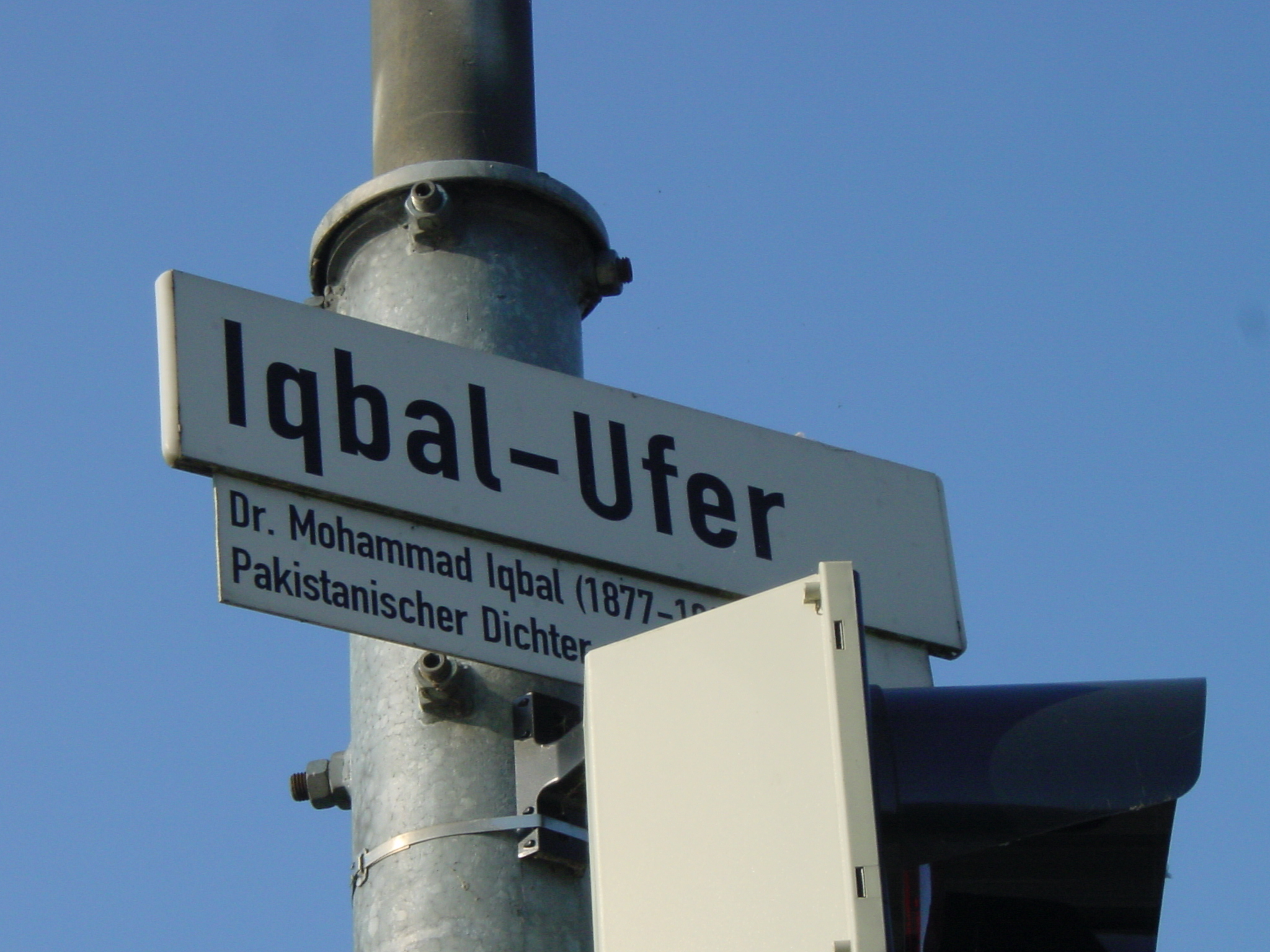
Sign for the street Iqbal-Ufer in Heidelberg, Germany, honouring Iqbal

Iqbal's views on the Western world have been applauded by Westerners, including United States Supreme Court Associate Justice William O. Douglas, who said that Iqbal's beliefs had "universal appeal". Soviet biographer N. P. Anikoy wrote:

[Iqbal is] great for his passionate condemnation of weak will and passiveness, his angry protest against inequality, discrimination and oppression in all forms, i.e., economic, social, political, national, racial, religious, etc., his preaching of optimism, an active attitude towards life and man's high purpose in the world, in a word, he is great for his assertion of the noble ideals and principles of humanism, democracy, peace and friendship among peoples.

Others, including Wilfred Cantwell Smith, stated that with Iqbal's anti-capitalist holdings, he was "anti-intellect", because "capitalism fosters intellect". Freeland Abbott objected to Iqbal's views of the West, saying that they were based on the role of imperialism and that Iqbal was not immersed enough in Western culture to learn about the various benefits of the modern democracies, economic practices and science. Critics of Abbot's viewpoint note that Iqbal was raised and educated in the European way of life, and spent enough time there to grasp the general concepts of Western civilization.

== Legacy ==
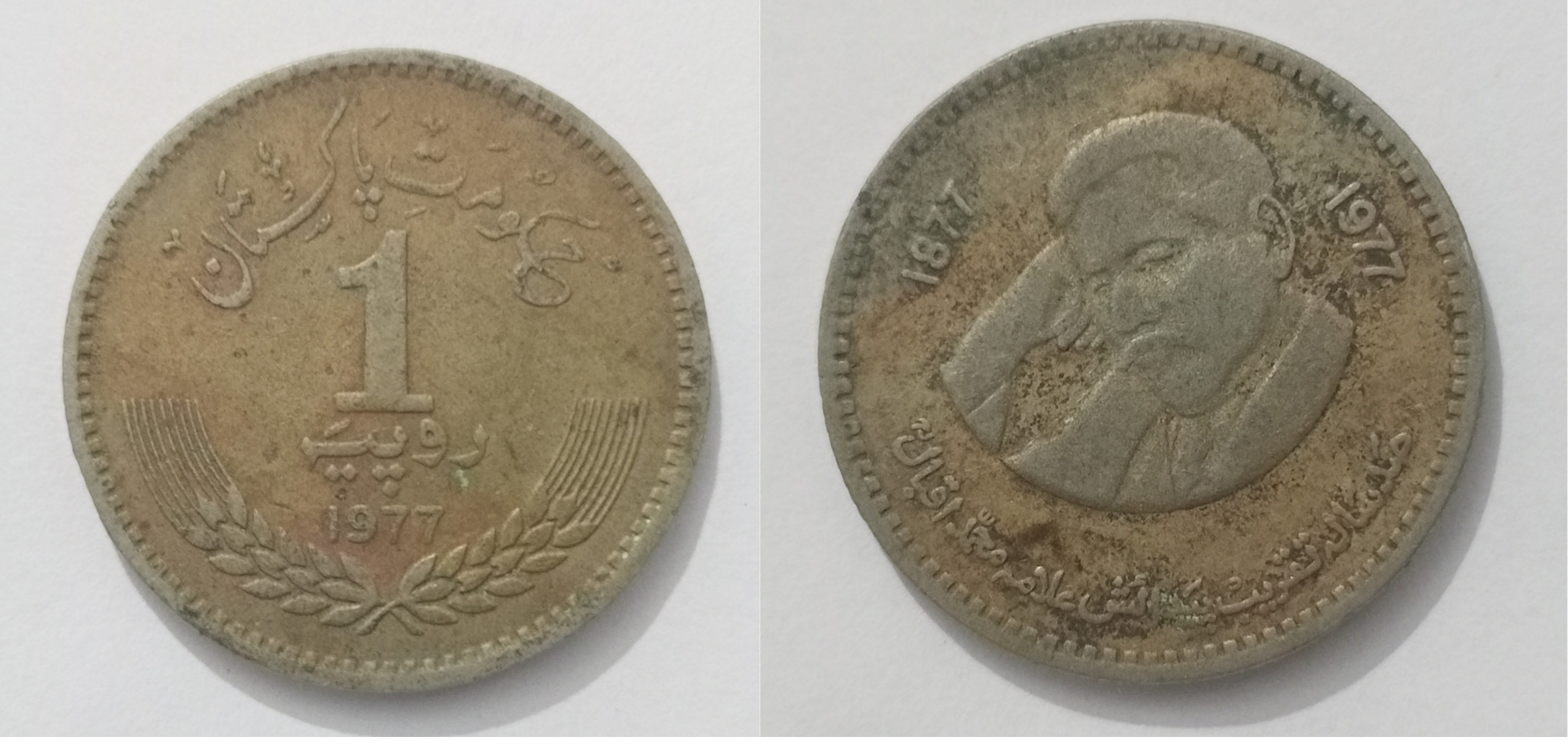
"ؒصد سالہ تقریب پیدائش علامہ محمد اقبال" (P, sad, one hundred) (P. sāla/sālha, years) (A taqrīb, anniversary) (P. paidāʼish, birth) of Allamah Muhammad Iqbal (R.A) on the obverse and "حکومتِ پاکستان 1 روپیہ" "Government of Pakistan, 1 Rūpiyah" on the reverse, among commemorative coins issued by the State Bank of Pakistan in 1977.

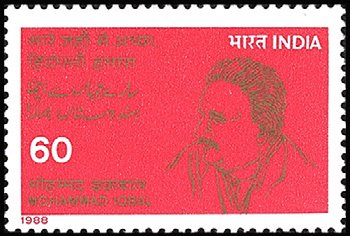
Indian Postage Stamp of Muhammad Iqbal, 1988

Iqbal is considered the greatest Urdu poet of the 20th century. Apart from Urdu, he is also recognized as a leading Persian poet and one of the foremost Islamic philosophers of the modern era. Iqbal is widely commemorated in Pakistan, where he is regarded as the ideological founder of the state. Iqbal is the namesake of many public institutions, including the Allama Iqbal Campus Punjab University in Lahore, the Allama Iqbal Medical College in Lahore, Iqbal Stadium in Faisalabad, Allama Iqbal Open University in Pakistan, Iqbal Memorial Institute in Srinagar, Allama Iqbal Library in the University of Kashmir, the Allama Iqbal International Airport in Lahore, Iqbal Hostel in Government College University, Lahore, the Allama Iqbal Hall at Nishtar Medical College in Multan, Gulshan-e-Iqbal Town in Karachi, Allama Iqbal Town in Lahore, Allama Iqbal Hall at Aligarh Muslim University, Allama Iqbal Hostel at Jamia Millia Islamia in New Delhi and Iqbal Hall at the University of Engineering and Technology, Lahore. Iqbal Hostel at Patna College in Bihar. Allama Iqbal College in Biharsharif. Allama Iqbal Unani Medical U.G. & P.G. College & ACN Hospital in Muzaffarnagar.Allama Iqbal Institute of Management in Kerala. Iqbal Academy Lahore has published magazines on Iqbal in Persian, English and Urdu.

In India, his song "Tarana-e-Hind" is frequently played as a patriotic song speaking of communal harmony. Dr. Mohammad Iqbal, an Indian documentary film directed by K.A. Abbas and written by Ali Sardar Jafri was released in 1978. It was produced by Government of India's Films Division.

The Government of Madhya Pradesh in India awards the Iqbal Samman, named in honour of the poet, every year at the Bharat Bhavan to Indian writers for their contributions to Urdu literature and poetry.

The Pakistani government and public organizations have sponsored the establishment of educational institutions, colleges, and schools dedicated to Iqbal and have established the Iqbal Academy Pakistan to research, teach and preserve his works, literature and philosophy. The Allama Iqbal Stamps Society was established for the promotion of Iqbal in philately and in other hobbies. His son Javed Iqbal served as a justice of the Supreme Court of Pakistan. Javaid Manzil was Iqbal's last residence.

In Bangladesh, Sir Iqbal Road in Khulna named after him.

== Gallery ==
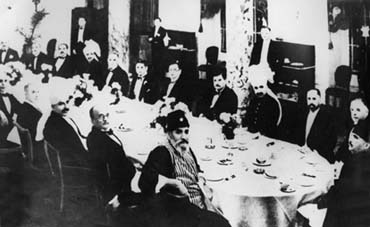
At a party during the 2nd Round Table Conference in London in 1931

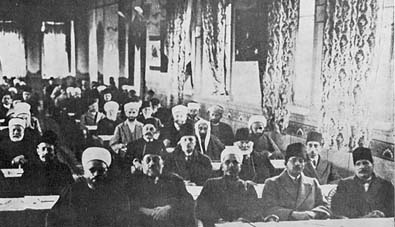
A view of the conference in West Jerusalem. Iqbal is seen sitting on the extreme right in the first row (1931).

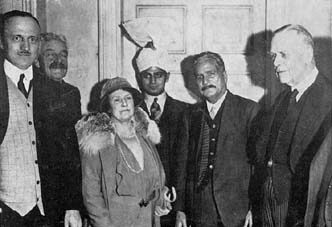
Iqbal reception given by the National League, London, in 1932

Iqbal in 1934

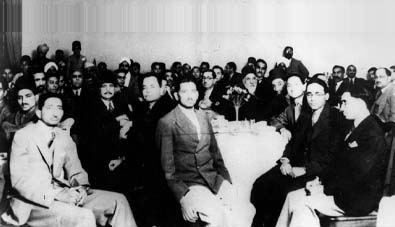
Iqbal in a reception given by citizens of Lahore in 1933

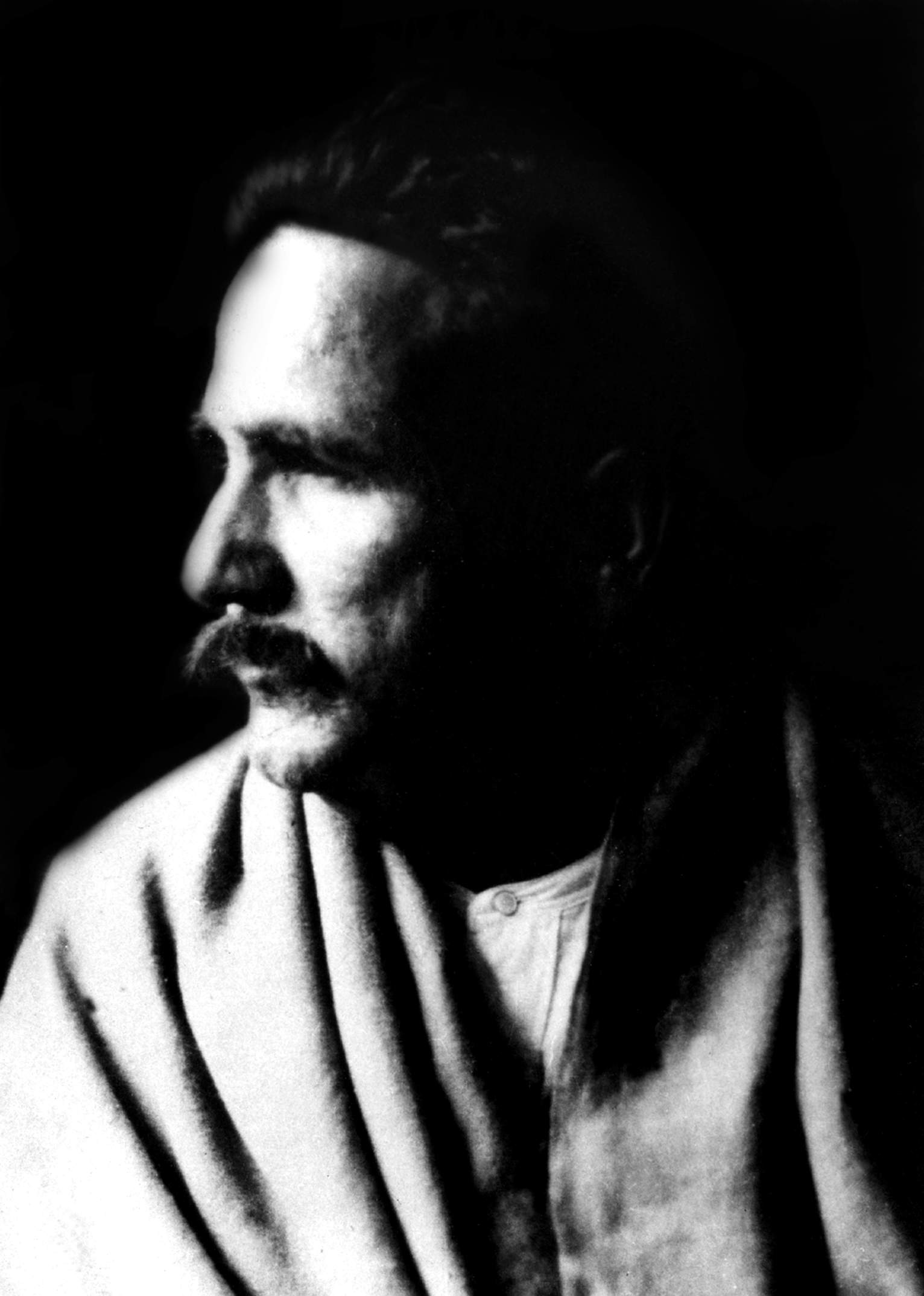
Iqbal at Shimla in 1930s

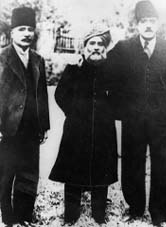
Iqbal in Afghanistan with Sulmain Nadavi and Ross Masood

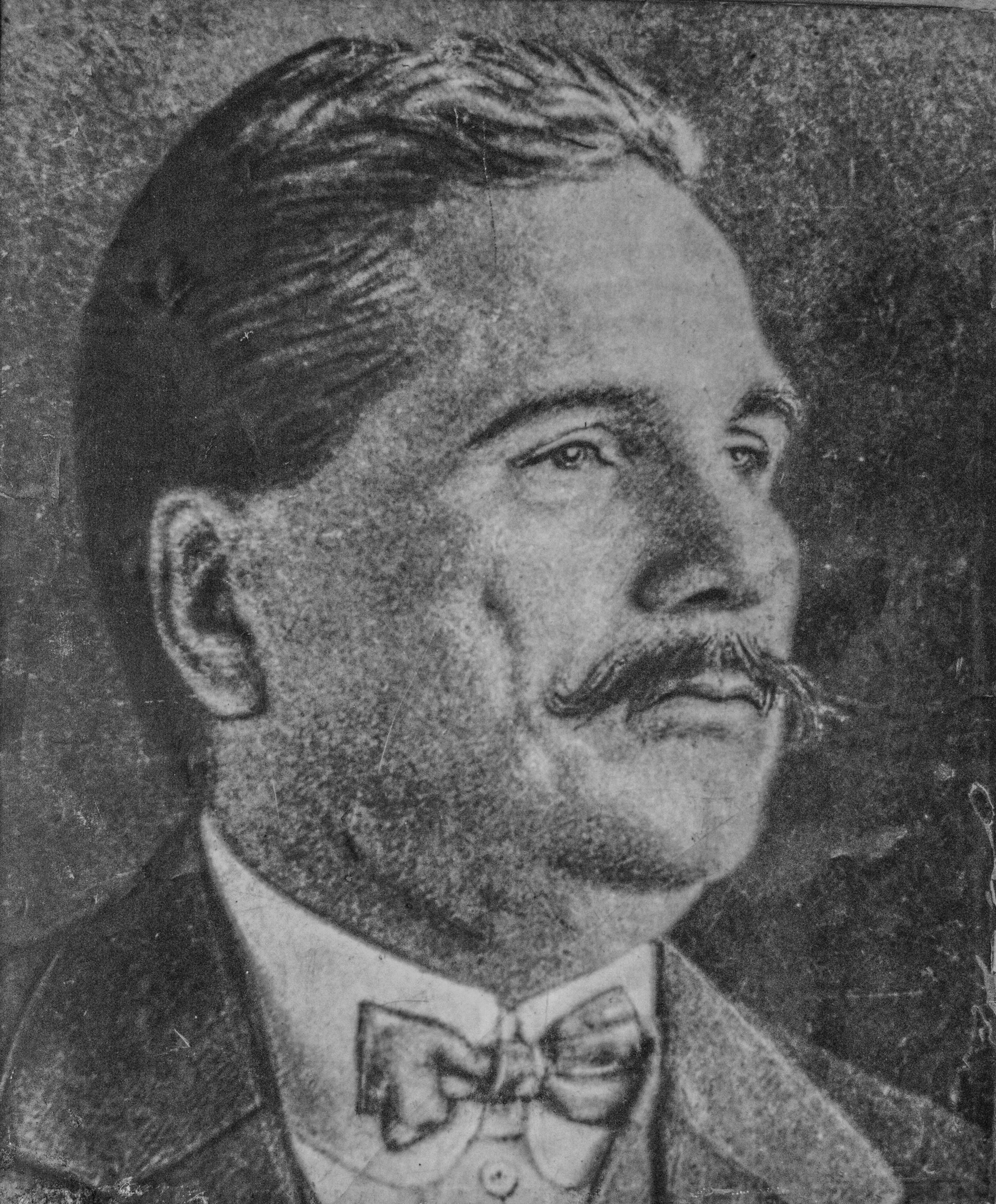
A monument displaying Iqbal

== Bibliography ==
=== Prose book in Urdu ===
- Ilm-ul-Iqtisad (1903)

=== Prose books in English ===
- The Development of Metaphysics in Persia (1908)
- The Reconstruction of Religious Thought in Islam (1930)

=== Poetic books in Persian ===
- Asrar-i-Khudi (1915)
- Rumuz-i-Bekhudi (1917)
- Payam-i-Mashriq (1923)
- Zabur-i-Ajam (1927)
- Javid Nama (1932)
- Pas Cheh Bayed Kard ai Aqwam-e-Sharq (1936)
- Armughan-e-Hijaz (1938) (in Persian and Urdu)

=== Poetic books in Urdu ===
- Bang-i-Dara (1924)
- Bal-i-Jibril (1935)
- Zarb-i Kalim (1936)
- Armughan-e-Hijaz (1938) (in Persian and Urdu)

== English translations ==
- Ali, Zirrar (2026) Masnavi Iqbal: Secrets of the Self
- Mir, Mustansir (2000) Tulip in the Desert: A Selection of Iqbal's Poetry
- D. J. Matthews (2017). Iqbal, a Selection of the Urdu Verse
- Ali, Zirrar (2021) Ghazi and the Garden: Poetry of Muhammad Iqbal by Zirrar Ali

== See also ==
- Index of Muhammad Iqbal–related articles

== Bibliography ==
- Ali, Zirrar (2021) Ghazi and the Garden: Poetry of Muhammad Iqbal by Zirrar Ali. ISBN 978-1-3999-0150-5.
- Ali, Zirrar (2026) Masnavi Iqbal: Secrets of the Self. ISBN 978-1-0369-5064-4.
- Shafique, Khurram Ali (2014). Iqbal: His Life and Our Times. ECO Cultural Institute & Iqbal Academy Pakistan. ISBN 978-0-9571416-6-7.
- Ram Nath, Kak (1995). Autumn Leaves: Kashmiri Reminiscences. India: Vitasta. ISBN 81-86588-00-0. Archived from the original on 30 June 2006.
- Mustansir, Mir (2006), Iqbal, I.B. Tauris, ISBN 1-84511-094-3
- Muhammad, Munawwar (2003). Iqbal-Poet Philosopher of Islam. Iqbal Academy Pakistan. ISBN 969-416-061-8.
- Sailen, Debnath (January 2010). Secularism: Western and Indian. New Delhi: Atlantic Publishers. ISBN 978-81-269-1366-4.
- V.S., Naipaul (1998). Beyond Belief: Islamic Excursions Among the Converted Peoples. USA: Random House. ISBN 0-375-50118-5.
- Annemarie, Schimmel (1963), Gabriel's Wing: a study of the religious ideas of Sir Muhammad Iqbal, Leiden, Netherlands: E. J. Brill
- "Special report: The enduring vision of Iqbal 1877–1938". DAWN. 9 November 2017.
- Anjum, Zafar (2014). Iqbal: The Life of a Poet, Philosopher and Politician. Random House India. ISBN 9788184006568.
- Burzine Waghmar, Annemarie Schimmel: Iqbal and Indo-Muslim Studies, Encyclopædia Iranica, New York: Encyclopædia Iranica Foundation, published online, 16 April 2018.
- Md Mahmudul Hasan, "Iqbal's and Hassan's Complaints: A Study of 'To the Holy Prophet' and 'SMS to Sir Muhammad Iqbal'". The Muslim World 110.2 (2020): 195–216. Iqbal's and Hassan's Complaints: A Study of "To the Holy Prophet" and "SMS to Sir Muhammad Iqbal"
- S.Aydin, Mehmet (2000). "İKBAL, Muhammed – An article published in Turkish Encyclopedia of Islam". TDV Encyclopedia of Islam (in Turkish). Vol. 22 (Ihvan-i Safa – Iskit). Istanbul: Türkiye Diyanet Vakfı İslâm Araştırmaları Merkezi. pp. 17–23. ISBN 978-975-389-449-4.
- Farrukhabadi, Rehmat (1962). اقبال اور عورت [Iqbal and Women] in Urdu. Sukkur, Pakistan: Ajaib Store Publications.

=== Online ===
- Muhammad Iqbal: poet and philosopher, in Encyclopædia Britannica Online, by Sheila D. McDonough, The Editors of Encyclopædia Britannica, Aakanksha Gaur, Gloria Lotha, J.E. Luebering, Kenneth Pletcher and Grace Young.
- Gibb, H. A. R. (2004). "Iqbal, Sir Muhammad (1877–1938)". Oxford Dictionary of National Biography (online ed.). Oxford University Press. doi:10.1093/ref:odnb/34108. (Subscription, Wikipedia Library access or UK public library membership required.)
