= Fritz Hommel =

German Orientalist (1854–1936)

- Born: 31 July 1854; Ansbach, Kingdom of Bavaria
- Died: 17 April 1936 (aged 81); Munich, Nazi Germany

Academic background
- Education: Ludwig-Maximilians-Universität München

Academic work
- Discipline: Semitic linguistics
- Institutions: Ludwig-Maximilians-Universität München
- Doctoral students: Muhammad Iqbal

Fritz Hommel (31 July 1854 – 17 April 1936) was a German Orientalist.

== Biography ==
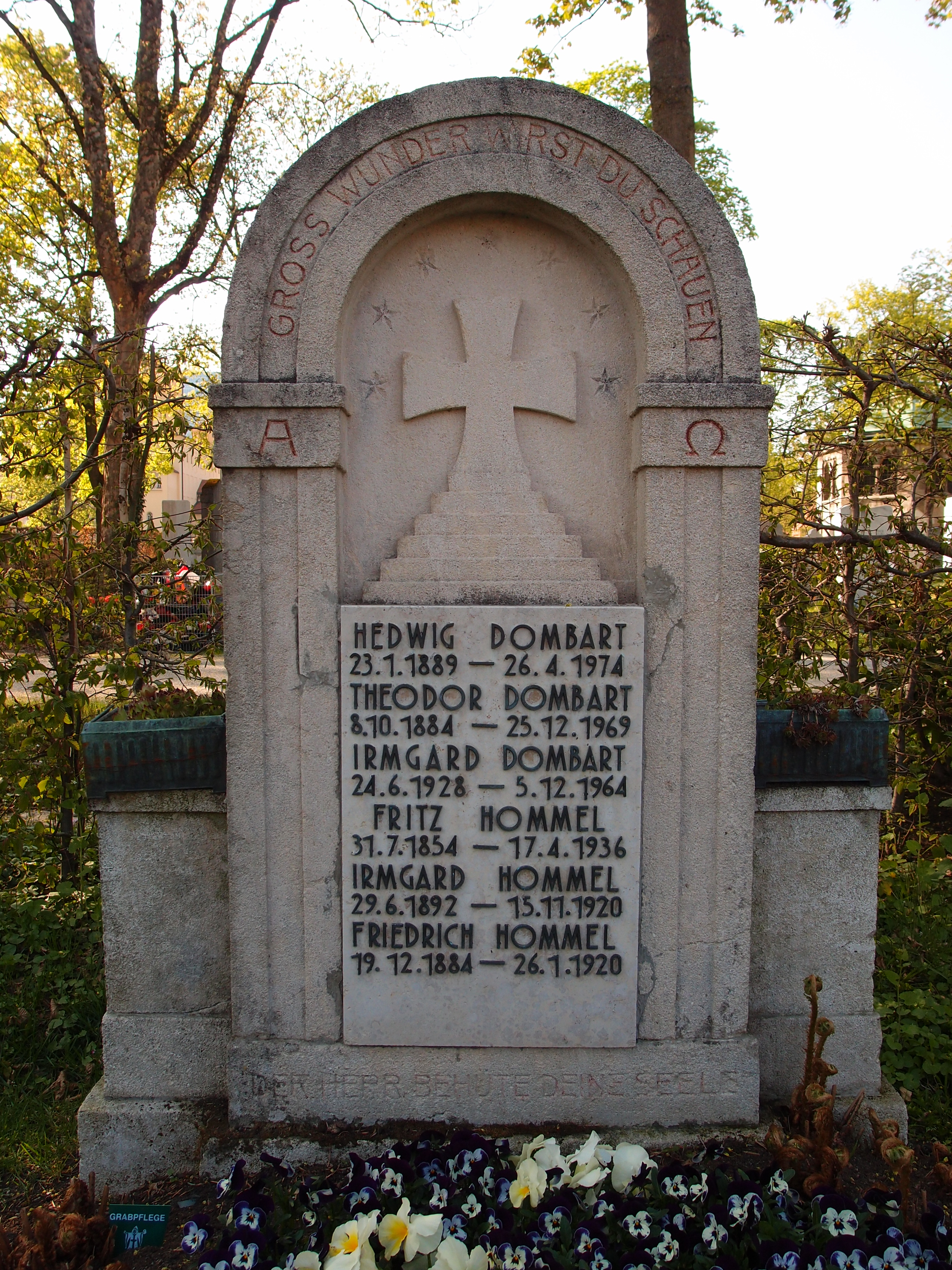
Grave of Fritz Hommel at Nordfriedhof in Munich

Hommel was born on 31 July 1854 in Ansbach. He studied at Leipzig University and was habilitated in 1877 at the Ludwig-Maximilians-Universität München, where in 1885, he became an extraordinary professor of Semitic languages. He became a full professor in 1892, and after his retirement in 1925, continued to give lectures at the Ludwig-Maximilians-Universität München. He was the doctoral supervisor of Islamic philosopher and poet Muhammad Iqbal, who wrote the thesis The Development of Metaphysics in Persia under his supervision.

He was intrigued by linguistic problems, and also interested in the history of the Middle East and its connection with culture and intellectual life. He excelled in studies of cuneiform literature, ancient Arabic poetry, Old Turkic inscriptions and the Egyptian Pyramid Texts.

He died on 17 April 1936 aged 81 in Munich.

== Works ==
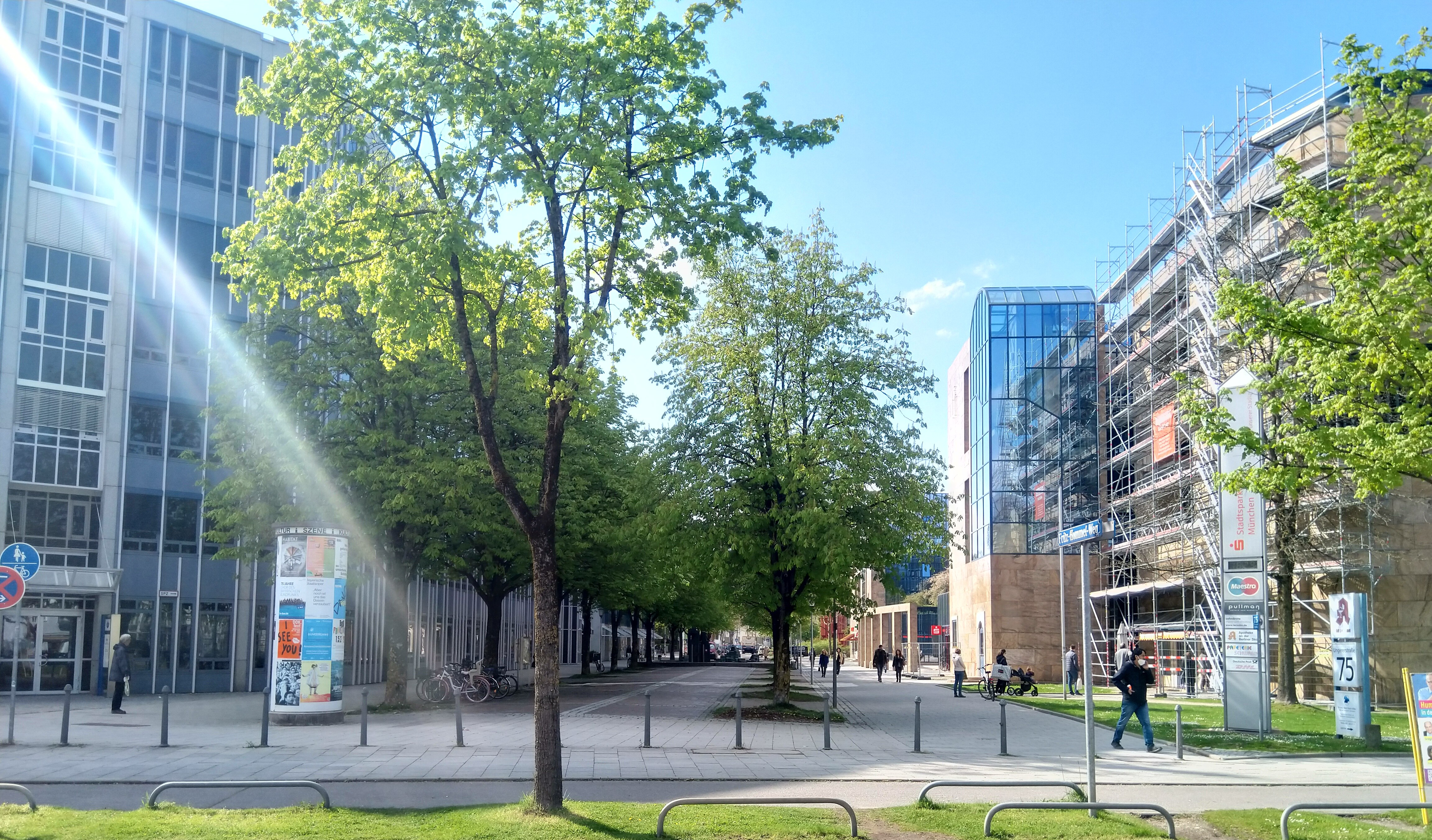
Fritz Hommel Way (German: Fritz-Hommel-Weg) in Munich

Among his better written efforts were a history of Babylonia and Assyria, Geschichte Babyloniens und Assyriens (1885) and a highly regarded work on the geography and history of the ancient Near East, titled: Grundriss der Geographie und Geschichte des Alten Orients (1904). Other significant writings by Hommel include:

- Die äthiopische Übersetzung des Physiologus (1877) – Ethiopian translation of the Physiologus
- Die Namen der Säugetiere bei den südsemitischen Völkern (1879).
- Zwei Jagdinschriften Asurbanipals (1879).
- Die semitischen Völker und Sprachen. Bd. 1 (1883) – Semitic peoples and languages.
- Die älteste arabische Baarlam-Version (1887) – The oldest Arabic version of Barlaam.
- Abriß der Geschichte des alten Orients (1887) – Outline on the history of the ancient Orient.
- Der babylonische Ursprung der ägyptischen Kultur (1892) – The Babylonian origin of Egyptian culture.
- Aufsätze und Abhandlungen arabistisch-Semitologischen Inhalts Bd. I-III (1892–1901) – Essays and treatises of Arabic-Semitological content.
- Südarabische Chrestomathie (1893) – South Arabian anthology.
- Sumerische Lesestücke (1894) – Sumerian readings.
- Geschichte des alten Morgenlandes (1904).
- Die altisraelische Überlieferung in inschriftlicher Beleuchtung (1896).
- Der Gestirndienst der alten Araber und die altisraelische Überlieferung (1900).
- Vier neue arabische Landschaftsnamen im Alten Testament (1901) – Four new Arab landscape names in the Old Testament.
- Zwei hundert sumero-türkische Wortvergleichungen (1915) – 200 Sumerian-Turkish word comparisons.
