= The Reconstruction of Religious Thought in Islam =

1930 series of lectures by Muhammad Iqbal

The Reconstruction of Religious Thought in Islam is a compilation of lectures delivered by Muhammad Iqbal on Islamic philosophy. Published in 1930, these lectures were delivered by Iqbal in Madras, Hyderabad, and Aligarh. The last chapter, "Is Religion Possible?", was added to the book from the 1934 Oxford Edition onwards.

In Reconstruction, Iqbal called for a re-examination of the intellectual foundations of Islamic philosophy. The book is a major work of modern Islamic thought. It was a major influence on Iranian sociologist Ali Shariati and other contemporary Muslim reformers, including Tariq Ramadan.

== Chapters ==
- Knowledge and Religious Experience
- The Philosophical Test of the Revelations of Religious Experience
- The Conception of God and the Meaning of Prayer
- The Human Ego – His Freedom and Immortality
- The Spirit of Muslim Culture
- The Principle of Movement in the Structure of Islam
- Is Religion Possible?

== Reviews ==
D.S. Margoliouth, an orientalist and a professor of Arabic at the University of Oxford, wrote "From the Qur'anic law of inheritance which makes the share of the male equal to that of two females the superiority of the male over the female has been inferred; such an assumption would, Sir M.Iqbal observes, be controversial to the spirit of Islam. The Qur'an says: And for women are rights over men similar to those for men over women." William Owen Carver (1898–1943) observed "His [Iqbal's] aim was "to reconstruct Muslim religious philosophy with due regard to the philosophical traditions of Islam and the more recent developments of human knowledge." Edward Hulmes noted "One of the author’s [Iqbal's] motives was to encourage his fellow countrymen to explore their own cultural roots after years of British colonial rule. But his aim was also to transcend the limited boundaries of national identity in order to 'build bridges' between peoples of different cultures and religious traditions."

== Editions ==
- Iqbal, Muhammad. The Reconstruction of Religious Thought in Islam. Kitab Bhavan, 2000. ISBN 81-7151-081-7.

== Bibliography ==
- Raschid, M.S. Iqbal's Concept of God. London: KPI, 1981. ISBN 0-7103-0187-1.

== See also ==
- Index of Muhammad Iqbal–related articles
