= Israr Ahmed =

Pakistani Islamic scholar (1932–2010)

Israr Ahmed SI
- اسرار احمد

Member of the National Assembly
- In office 1981–1982
- President: Zia-ul-Haq

1st Ameer of Tanzeem-e-Islami
- In office 1975–2002
- Preceded by: Position established
- Succeeded by: Akif Saeed

1st President of Anjuman Khuddam-ul-Quran
- In office 1972–2010
- Preceded by: Position established
- Succeeded by: Dr Arif Rasheed

Personal details
- Awards: Sitara-i-Imtiaz

Personal life
- Born: 26 April 1932 Hisar, Punjab, British India (now in Haryana, India)
- Died: 14 April 2010 (aged 77) Lahore, Punjab, Pakistan
- Main interests: Islamic philosophy; Quran and Sunnah; realism; rationalism
- Notable idea(s): Call to Qur'an, revival of Khilafah, and prophetic model of revolution
- Notable work: The Call of Tanzeem-e-Islami
- Education: King Edward Medical College (MBBS); University of Karachi (B.A., M.A.
- Website: Israr's official website Tanzeem-e-Islami website

Religious life
- Religion: Islam
- Movement: Tanzeem-e-Islami 1975–2002; Jamaat-e-Islami 1947–1957

Muslim leader
- Influenced by: Mahmud Hasan Deobandi; Shabbir Ahmad Usmani; Abul Kalam Azad; Abul A'la Maududi; Hamiduddin Farahi; Amin Ahsan Islahi; Muhammad Iqbal; Muhammad Rafiuddin; Shah Waliullah Dehlawi
- Influenced: Imran N. Hosein; Zakir Naik; Nouman Ali Khan; Akif Saeed; Shujauddin Shaikh; Muhammad Yaseen; Muhammad Ali Mirza
- Awards: Sitara-i-Imtiaz (1981)

Dr. Israr Ahmad (Note: Urdu: اسرار احمد, romanized: Isrār Aḥmad) (26 April 1932 – 14 April 2010) was a Pakistani Islamic scholar, theologian and orator. He developed a following in Pakistan and the rest of South Asia and also among some South Asian Muslims in the Middle East, Western Europe, and North America. He founded Tanzeem-e-Islami and also served as a member of the National Assembly from 1981 to 1982.

He has written around 60 books in Urdu on Islam and Pakistan, of which twenty-nine have been translated into several other languages, including in English, as of 2017.

In 1956, he left the Jamaat-e-Islami, which had become involved in electoral politics, to found Tanzeem-e-Islami. Like many other Sunni Islamic activists/revivalists he preached that the teachings of the Qur'an and the Sunnah and divine law of Sharia must be implemented in all spheres of life, that the Caliphate must be restored as a true Islamic state, and that Western values and influences were a threat to Islam and Pakistan. He was also known for his staunch belief that only Pakistan, not any Arab land, should be the foundation for a new caliphate, and that democratic governance was un-Islamic.

He was awarded the Sitara-i-Imtiaz, the third-highest civilian award from Pakistan, in 1981.

== Early life and education ==
Dr. Israr Ahmad was born on 26 April 1932, into a Ranghar family of Muslim Rajputs in Hisar, a city in the Punjab Province of British India (now in Haryana, India). His ancestral roots lie in the Muzaffarnagar district of modern-day Western Uttar Pradesh, but following the 1857 War of Independence, his grandfather's properties were confiscated, so the family moved to Hisar. His father was a civil servant in the British government who relocated his family from Hisar to Montgomery, now Sahiwal, in the West Punjab province of the Dominion of Pakistan (now in Punjab, Pakistan).

After graduating from a local high school, Dr. Israr Ahmad moved to Lahore to attend the King Edward Medical University in 1950. He received his MBBS degree from King Edward Medical University in 1954 and began practising medicine. In addition, he obtained his master's degree in Islamic Studies from the University of Karachi in 1965.

Dr. Israr Ahmad worked briefly for Muslim Student's Federation in the Independence Movement and, following the creation of Pakistan in 1947, for the Islami Jami`yat-e-Talaba and then in 1950 joined Jamaat-e-Islami led by Abul Ala Maududi. He left the party when the latter opted for participating in electoral politics in 1957 in the belief that involvement in national politics was irreconcilable with the revolutionary methodology adopted by the Jama'at in the pre-1947 period. His interest in Islam and philosophy grew further and he subsequently moved to Karachi in the 1960s, where he enrolled in Karachi University to study Islam.

== Influences ==
Supporters describe his vision of Islam as having been synthesised from diverse sources. Dr. Israr Ahmad worked closely with Syed Abul A'la Maududi (1903–1979) and Amin Ahsan Islahi, (as did Wahiduddin Khan, Naeem Siddiqui and Javed Ahmad Ghamidi). He has also acknowledged the "deep influence" of Shah Waliullah Dehlawi, the 18th-century Indian Islamic leader, anti-colonial activist, jurist, and scholar.

"In the context of Qur'anic exegesis and understanding, Dr. Israr Ahmad was a firm traditionalist of the genre of Mahmud Hasan Deobandi and Shabbir Ahmad Usmani; yet he presented Qur'anic teachings in a scientific and enlightened way". Dr. Israr Ahmad believed in what he called "Islamic revolutionary thought," which consists of the idea that Islam – the teachings of the Qur'an and the Sunnah – must be implemented in the social, cultural, juristic, political, and economic spheres of life. In this he is said to follow Muhammad Rafiuddin and Muhammad Iqbal. The first attempt towards the actualisation of this concept was reportedly made by Abul Kalam Azad through his short-lived party, the Hizbullah. Another attempt was made by Abul A'la Maududi through his Jamaat-e-Islami party. Although the Jamaat-e-Islami has reached some influence, Dr. Israr Ahmad resigned from the party in 1956 when it entered the electoral process and believed that such an involvement led to "degeneration from a pure Islamic revolutionary party to a mere political one".

== Career ==
=== Jamaat-e-Islami ===
Originally a member of Jamaat-e-Islami, Dr. Israr Ahmad stated that he became disappointed with its turn towards electoral activity, disagreed with it on "significant policy matters", including what he saw as the "lack of effort to create an Islamic renaissance through the revolutionary process." He considered Jamaat-e-Islami's "plunge" into "the arena of power politics," to have been "disastrous." He and some other individuals resigned from JI and in 1956 founded the nucleus of Tanzeem-e-Islami, passing a resolution "which subsequently became the Mission Statement of Tanzeem-e-Islami."

Along with his work to revive what he called "the Qur'an-centered Islamic perennial philosophy and world-view" Dr. Israr Ahmad stated that his goal and the goal of his organizations was to "reform the society in a practical way with the ultimate objective of establishing a true Islamic State, or the System of Khilafah".

=== Tanzeem-e-Islami ===
In 1971 Dr. Israr Ahmad gave up his medical practice to "launch a movement for the revival of Islam". "As a result of his efforts" the Markazi Anjuman Khuddam-ul-Quran Lahore was established in 1972, Tanzeem-e-Islami was founded in 1975, and Tahreek-e-Khilafat Pakistan was launched in 1991.

=== Television ===
Dr. Israr Ahmad was not well known and Tanzeem-e-Islami (TI) was relatively small until 1981 when President at the time Muhammad Zia-ul-Haq—who was working to "Islamize" Pakistan—asked the state-owned Pakistan television channel (PTV), to give Israr a weekly show. It became one of the first shows in Pakistan where a scholar "would sit in front of an audience and deliver lectures on Islam". Israr is thought to have been instrumental in bringing changes to Pakistan TV during that time eliminating Western dress for women and requiring hijab. Israr later refused to appear on TV after segments of his program calling for a ban on televising cricket matches were censored, but by then had developed a large following in Pakistan.

=== Publications ===
Dr. Israr Ahmad has authored over 60 books in Urdu on topics related to Islam and Pakistan, nine of which have been translated into English and other languages.

== Religious and political views ==
=== Governance ===
Dr. Israr Ahmad opposed modern democracy and the prevalent electoral system, arguing that in a true Islamic state the ruler has the power to overturn the majority decisions of an elected assembly.

=== Abul Ala Maududi ===
While Dr. Israr Ahmad "considers himself a product" of the teachings of "comprehensive and holistic concept of the Islamic obligations" of Abul Ala Maududi, he opposed Jamaat-e-Islami's entry into "the arena of power politics". Instead he believed what was needed was a "revolutionary methodology" pursued by a "disciplined organization".

=== Caliphate ===
While many, if not all, Sunni activists seek a return of the Caliphate, an "important aspect of Dr. Israr Ahmad's ideology" was his belief that "the foundations for the caliphate" should not be in Hijaz, Baghdad, or other more traditional sites, but rather in Pakistan, to where he believed that "the spiritual nerve center of the Islamic intellectual movement had shifted."

=== Hizb ut-Tahrir ===
Both Hizb ut-Tahrir and Tanzeem-e-Islami share a belief in the revival of the Caliphate as a means of implementing Islam in all spheres of life, according to Tanzeem-e-Islami's FAQ. However, Tanzeem-e-Islami seeks a popular Islamic revival which will then lead to political revolution rather than involvement in electoral politics, armed struggle, coup d'état to establish a caliphate. Tanzeem-e-Islami believes that once the Islamic revolution has taken place, the election of the Khalifah would be done on the basis of electoral votes. Tanzeem-e-Islami emphasises that iman (faith) among Muslims must be revived in "a significant portion of the Muslim society" before there can be an Islamic revival.

=== Non-violence ===
According to the website of Dr. Israr Ahmad's organization, Tanzeem-e-Islam (as of 2017):

"We believe that an Islamic state can be established in Pakistan by means of a popular non-violent movement ... a coup d'etat can never produce a stable and positive change as it does not involve changing the beliefs and thoughts of the people."

However, critic Farhan Zahid notes that "a number" of the members of Tanzeem-e-Islam "have reportedly been arrested in connection with IS' Khurasan province and accused by the authorities of involvement in terrorist financing", and that "speeches" by Israr "still circulate online among jihadists, raising concerns that the group provides an entryway to Islamist extremism."

=== Anti-Shi'i views ===
Scholar Vali Nasr argues that in the 1980s Dr. Israr Ahmad became part of Saudi Arabia's anti-Shiite campaign, particularly his "popular Friday sermons in Bagh-i Jinnah park in Lahore". The campaign evolved from attacking Khomeini and his theories, to moving Shi'ism "outside the pale" of Islam, to transforming "doctrinal and theological disputes into communal ones." This campaign eventually led to violence. As many as 4,000 people are estimated to have been killed by Shia-Sunni sectarian attacks in Pakistan between 1987 and 2007.

=== Role of women ===
In 1982 Dr. Israr Ahmad presented his view that women should 'be barred from all professions except medicine and teaching".

=== Cricket ===
In a conversation with then-president Zia-ul Haq, Dr. Israr Ahmad urged that the game of cricket be banned.

In some of his appearances before a TV studio audience, Dr. Israr Ahmad complained:

"Cricket is making Pakistanis ignore their religious obligations, ... I am convinced that cricket matches should not be shown on TV."

Dr. Israr Ahmad also maintained that only men should be allowed to watch cricket matches. He later complained that bowlers were rubbing the cricket ball suggestively on their bodies.

=== Views on Jews ===
Dr. Israr Ahmad often mentioned about how "Jews and Israel" were attempting "to destabilize Pakistani society". He would include comments on the "Jew World Order", descriptions of "Jews as 'cursed people' or 'cursed race' who actually conspired against Muslims for centuries", and were 'followers of Satan, bent on destroying Islam'. However, in one of his speeches on "What rights do non-Muslims have in Islamic states?", Dr. Israr Ahmed did say that in an Islamic state, places of worship such as temples, churches and synagogues must not be destroyed and should be protected.

=== Views on foreign powers ===
Dr. Israr Ahmad opposed the 2007 Pakistani state of emergency and in a televised press conference called for the resignation of President Pervez Musharraf. from both the presidency and chief of army staff.

While on television, Dr. Israr Ahmad predicted and warned the nation that, "If the situation worsens, the NATO forces are waiting on the western front to move into Pakistan and may deprive the country of its nuclear assets while on the eastern front, India is ready to stage an action replay of Indo-Pakistani war of 1971 and has alerted its armed forces to intervene in to check threats to peace in the region."

Asia Times reports that in September 1995 Dr. Israr Ahmad told the annual convention of the Islamic Society of North America: "The process of the revival of Islam in different parts of the world is real. A final showdown between the Muslim world and the non-Muslim world, which has been captured by the Jews, would soon take place. The Gulf War was just a rehearsal for the coming conflict." He appealed to the Muslims of the world, including those in the US, to prepare themselves for the coming conflict.

=== Babri Masjid demolition ===
After the Demolition of the Babri Masjid in India, Israr criticised the vengeful demolition of Hindu temples in Pakistan, calling them un-Islamic and making the perpetrators the same as Hindu extremists in India.

== Death and legacy ==
Dr. Israr Ahmad relinquished the leadership of Tanzeem-e-Islami in October 2002 because of bad health. He had appointed Hafiz Akif Saeed the emir of the Tanzeem (from 2002 to 2020) to whom all rufaqaa of Tanzeem renewed their pledge of Baiyah.

Dr. Israr Ahmad died of cardiac arrest at his home in Lahore on the morning of 14 April 2010. He was 12 days short of his 78th birthday. He had given up the leadership of Tanzeem-i-Islami in 2002 due to poor health. According to his son, his health deteriorated at around 1:30 am with pain in the back. He was a long time heart patient. His survivors included a wife, four sons and five daughters. His four sons, Arif Rasheed, Akif Saeed, Asif Hameed and Atif Waheed, have all been involved in Islamic activism.

One major Pakistani English-language newspaper (Dawn) commented after his death, "Founder of several organisations like Anjuman-i-Khuddamul Quran, Tanzeem-i-Islami and Tehrik-i-Khilafat, he had followers in Pakistan, India and Gulf countries, especially in Saudi Arabia. He spent almost four decades in trying to reawaken interest in Quran-based Islamic philosophy."

== Awards and recognition ==
- Sitara-i-Imtiaz (Star of Excellence) award by the president of Pakistan in 1981 for his contribution in the field of religion.

== Books ==
- Aḥmad, A.; Jamīlurraḥmān, S. (2020). Minhaj-i inqilāb-i Nabavī: Siratunnabī ṣallallāhu ʻalaih va sallam kā ijmālī mut̤ālaʻah; falsafah-yi inqilāb ke nuqt̤ah-yi naz̤ar se (in Latvian). Arīb Pablīkeshanz. Archived from the original on 22 April 2023.
- Aḥmad, A.; Ahmad, A.; Markazī Anjuman-i K̲h̲uddamulqurʼān (2008). The Prophet's Strategy for Islamic Revolution. Markazi Anjuman Khuddam-ul-Quran. Archived from the original on 22 April 2023.
- Aḥmad, A.; K̲h̲iz̤ar, K.M.; Markazī Anjuman-i K̲h̲uddamulqurʼān (2008). Iqāmat-i dīn kī jidd o jahd karne vālī ḥizbullāh ke auṣāf aur amīr va māʼmūrīn kā bāhmī taʻalluq. Mut̤ālaʻah-yi Qurān-i ḥakīm kā muntak̲h̲ib niṣāb (in Latvian). Maktabah-yi K̲h̲uddāmulqurʼān. Archived from the original on 22 April 2023.
- Aḥmad, A. (2008). Islām men̲ ʻaurat kā maqām: mushtamil bar k̲h̲it̤āb-i amīr tanẓīm Islāmī ḍākṭar Isrār Aḥmad va dīgar maqālāt (in Latvian). Arīb Pablīkeshanz. Archived from the original on 22 April 2023.
- Aḥmad, A.; Markazī Anjuman-i K̲h̲uddamulqurʼān (2007). The Reality of Tasawwuf in the Light of the Prophetic Model. Markazi Anjuman Khuddam ul Qurʻan. Archived from the original on 22 April 2023.
- Aḥmad, A.; Markazī Anjuman-i Ḵẖuddamulqurʼān (2007). ʻAllamah Iqbāl, Qāʻid-i Aʻẓam aur naẓariyah-yi Pākistān: aur is naẓariye se inḥirāf ke natāʼij (in Latin). Maktabah-yi K̲h̲uddamulqurʼān. Archived from the original on 22 April 2023.
- Aḥmad, A.; Markazī Anjuman-i K̲h̲uddamulqurʼān (2007). Synthesis of Iman: Discourse on Al-e-Imran, 3:190–195. Markazi Anjuman Khuddam ul Qurʻan. Archived from the original on 22 April 2023.
- Aḥmad, A.; Markazī Anjuman-i K̲h̲uddamulqurʼān (2006). Khilafah in Pakistan: What, why & how ?. Markazi Anjuman Khuddam-ul-Qurʼan. Archived from the original on 22 April 2023.
- Aḥmad, A.; Markazī Anjuman-i K̲h̲uddamulqurʼān (2006). Baṣāʼir (in Latvian). Maktabah-yi K̲h̲uddamulqurʼān. Archived from the original on 22 April 2023.
- Aḥmad, A. (2005). ISLAMIC RENAISSANCE : THE REAL TASK AHEAD. Adam Publishers & Distributors. ISBN 978-81-7435-410-5. Archived from the original on 22 April 2023.
- Aḥmad, A. (2005). Mut̤ālaʻah Qurʼān-i ḥakīm kā muntak̲h̲ab niṣāb (in Latvian). Markazī Anjuman K̲h̲idām al-Qurʼān. Archived from the original on 22 April 2023.
- Aḥmad, A. (2005). The Obligations Muslims Owe to the Qurʼan. Markazi Anjuman Khuddam-ul-Qurʼan. ISBN 978-0-907461-59-3. Archived from the original on 22 April 2023.
- Aḥmad, A.; Markazī Anjuman-i K̲h̲uddamulqurʼān (2005). Pākistān men̲ niẓām-i k̲h̲ilāfat: kya, kiyūn̲ aur kaise? (in Latvian). Markazī Anjuman Khuddam-ul-Qurʼan. Archived from the original on 22 April 2023.
- Aḥmad, A.; Siddiqui, I.A. (2004). The Way to Salvation in the Light of Surah Al-ʻsar. Markazi Anjuman Khuddam-ul-Quran. Archived from the original on 22 April 2023.
- Aḥmad, A. (2004). Lessons from History: Reflections on the Past, Present and Future of Two Muslim Communities. Markazi Anjuman Khuddam-ul-Qurʼan. Archived from the original on 22 April 2023.
- Aḥmad, A.; Markazī Anjuman-i K̲h̲uddamulqurʼān (2004). Shīʻah Sunnī mufāhamat kī z̤arūrat va ahamiyat aur ahl-i Sunnat aur ahl-i Tashayyuʻ ke baʻz̤ aham iḵẖtilāfāt kī aṣl ḥaqīqat o ḥais̲iyat (in Quechua). Maktabah-yi Markazī Anjuman-i Ḵẖuddāmulqurʼān. Archived from the original on 22 April 2023.
- Aḥmad, A.; Markazī Anjuman-i K̲h̲uddamulqurʼān (2004). Shīʻah Sunnī mufāhimat kī z̤arūrat va ahmiyat aur ahl-i Sunnat aur ahl-i Tashayyiʻ ... (in Latvian). Maktabah-yi Markazī Anjuman-i K̲h̲uddāmulqurʼān. Archived from the original on 22 April 2023.
- Aḥmad, A.; Markazī Anjuman-i K̲h̲uddamulqurʼān (2003). The Tragedy of Karbala. Adam Publishers & Distributors. ISBN 978-81-7435-404-4. Archived from the original on 22 April 2023.
- Aḥmad, A. (2003). Religious Obligations of Muslim Women. Markazi Anjuman Khuddam ul Qurʼan. ISBN 978-81-7435-392-4. Archived from the original on 22 April 2023.
- Aḥmad, A.; Markazī Anjuman-i K̲h̲uddamulqurʼān (2003). Calling People Unto Allah: Its Need, Importance and Fundamental Principles. Markazi Anjuman Khuddam-ul-Qur'an. Archived from the original on 22 April 2023.
- Aḥmad, A. (2003). Maz̲habī jamāʻaton̲ ke bāhmi ̄taʻāvun ke zimn men̲ tanẓīm-i Islāmī kī masāʻī ... aur Jamāʻat-i Islāmī aur taḥrīk-i Islāmī ke sāth vifāq ke qayām kī peshkash. Silsilah-yi Ishāʻat-i Tanẓīm-i Islāmī (in Latvian). Markazī Anjuman-i K̲h̲uddamulqurʼān. Archived from the original on 22 April 2023.
- Aḥmad, A.; Tanẓīm-i Islāmī (Organization) (2003). Maẕhabī jamāʻatoṉ ke bāhmī taʻāvun ke z̤imn meṉ Tanẓīm-i Islāmī kī masāʻī ... aur Jamāʻat-i Islāmī aur taḥrīk-i Islāmī ke sāth vifāq ke qiyām kī pesh kash. Silsilah-yi ishāʻat-i Tanẓīm-i Islāmī (in Latvian). Markazī Anjuman-i Ḵẖuddamulqurʼān. Archived from the original on 22 April 2023.
- Aḥmad, A.; Markazī Anjuman-i K̲h̲uddamulqurʼān (2002). Obligations to God: A Comprehensive Islamic View. Markazi Anjuman Khuddam-ul-Qurʼan. Archived from the original on 22 April 2023.
- Aḥmad, A.; Afzaal, A.; Markazī Anjuman-i K̲h̲uddamulqurʼān (2001). Baiʻyah: The Basis for Organization of a Revivalist Party in Islam. Markazi Anjuman Khuddam-ul-Qurʼan. Archived from the original on 22 April 2023.
- Aḥmad, A.; Markazī Anjuman-i K̲h̲uddamulqurʼān (2001). Three-point Action Agenda for the Muslim Ummah. Markazi Anjuman Khuddam-ul-Qurʼan. Archived from the original on 22 April 2023.
- Aḥmad, A. (2000). پاكستان، ايک فيصله كن دوراهے پر (in Urdu). تنظيم اسلامى پاكستان،. Archived from the original on 22 April 2023.
- Aḥmad, A. (2000). The Call of Tanzeem-e-Islami. Tanzeem-e-Islami North America. Archived from the original on 22 April 2023.
- Aḥmad, A. (2000). Pākistān, ek faiṣlah kun daurāhe par (in Latvian). Tanẓīm-i Islāmī Pākistān. Archived from the original on 22 April 2023.
- Aḥmad, A. (1997). K̲h̲ut̤bāt-i k̲h̲ilāfat: yaʻnī k̲h̲ilāfat kī aṣl ḥaqīqat aur us kā tārīk̲h̲ī pas manẓar ... (in Latvian). Markazī Anjuman-i K̲h̲uddāmulqurʼān. Archived from the original on 22 April 2023.
- Aḥmad, A. (1996). Rāh-i nijāt, Sūrat al-ʻaṣr kī roshnīmen̲ (in Latvian). Markazī Anjuman-i K̲h̲uddamulqurʼān. Archived from the original on 22 April 2023.
- Aḥmad, A. (1996). Sābiqah aur maujūdah Musalmān ummaton kā māz̤ī ḥāl aur mustaqbil aur Musalmānān-i Pākistan kīẓimmahdārī (in Latvian). Maktabah-i Markazi Anjuman-i Ḵẖuddāmulqurʾān. Archived from the original on 22 April 2023.
- Aḥmad, A. (1996). سابقه اور موجوده مسلمان امتوں كا مضى حال اور مستقبل اور مسلمانان پاكستان كى خصوصى ذمه دارى (in Arabic). Maktabah-i Markazī Anjuman-i K̲h̲uddāmulqurʻān. Archived from the original on 22 April 2023.
- Aḥmad, A.; Cishtī, Y.S.; Niyāzī, N. (1995). ʻAllāmah Iqbāl aur ham /Asrār Aḥmad, Yūsuf Salīm Cishtī, Sayyid Naz̲īr Niyāzī (in Latvian). Markazī Anjuman K̲h̲uddām-ul-Qurān. Archived from the original on 22 April 2023.
- Aḥmad, A. (1995). Ummat-i Muslimah ke līe sih nukātī lāʼiḥah-yi ʻamal aur ... (in Latvian). Maktabah-yi Markazī Anjuman-i K̲h̲uddāmulqurʼān. Archived from the original on 22 April 2023.
- Aḥmad, A. (1994). Barr-i ʻaẓīm Pāk o Hind men̲ Islām ke inqilābī fikr kī tajdīd o taʻmīl aur is se inḥirāf kī rāhen̲ (in Latvian). Maktabah-yi Markazī-i Anjuman-i K̲h̲uddāmulqurʼān. Archived from the original on 22 April 2023.
- Aḥmad, A. (1992). دعوت رجو الى الرآن كا منضر و پس منضر. Daʻvat-i rujuʻ ilalqurʾān kā manẓar va pas manẓar (in Urdu). مكتبه مركزى انجمن خدام القرآن،1992. Archived from the original on 22 April 2023.
- Aḥmad, A.; Jamīlurraḥmān, S. (1989). Minhaj-i inqilāb-i Nabavī: Siratunnabī kā ijmālī mut̤ālaʻah ... (in Latvian). Markazī Anjuman-i K̲h̲uddāmulqurʼān. Archived from the original on 22 April 2023.
- Aḥmad, A. (1989). Nabī-i Akram ... kā maqṣad-i biʻs̲at aur inqilāb-i Nabavī kā asāsī minhāj (in Latvian). Maktabah-yi Markazī-i Anjuman-i K̲h̲uddāmulqurʼān. Archived from the original on 22 April 2023.
- Aḥmad, A. (1989). Istiḥkām-i Pākistān aur masʼalah-yi Sindh (in Latvian). Markazī Anjuman-i K̲h̲uddāmulqurʼān. Archived from the original on 22 April 2023.
- Aḥmad, A. (1986). Istihkam-i Pakistan (in Maltese). Archived from the original on 22 April 2023.
- Aḥmad, A. (1984). Islām men̲ ʻaurat kā maqām: ... Ḍākṭar Asrār Aḥmad kā ek aham k̲h̲it̤āb (in Latvian). Maktabah Anjuman-i K̲h̲uddāmulqurʼān. Archived from the original on 22 April 2023.
- Aḥmad, A. (1984). Musalmānoṉ par Qurʼān-i Majīd ke ḥuqūq (in Latvian). Markazī Anjuman-i Ḵẖuddāmulqurʼān. Archived from the original on 22 April 2023.
- Aḥmad, A. (1984). Rasūl-i Kāmil (in Latvian). Markazī Anjuman-i Ḵẖuddāmulqurʼān. Archived from the original on 22 April 2023.
- Aḥmad, A. (1983). تحريک جماعت اسلامى: ايک تحقيقى مطالعہ (in Arabic). مرکزى مکتبہ تنظيم اسلامى،. Archived from the original on 22 April 2023.
- Aḥmad, A. (1983). Islām aur Pākistān: tārik̲h̲ī, siyāsī, ʻilmī, aur saqāfatī pas manẓar (in Latvian). Markazī Anjuman-i K̲h̲uddāmulqurʼān. Archived from the original on 22 April 2023.
- Aḥmad, A. (1980). The Quran and World Peace. Markazi Anjuman Khuddam-ul-Quran. Archived from the original on 22 April 2023.
- Aḥmad, A. (1980). Two Periods of Rise and Decline of the Muslim Unmah (community): With a Comparison to Jewish History and a Brief Survey of the Present Efforts Towards an Islamic Resurgence. Markazi Anjuman Khuddam-ul-Quran. Archived from the original on 22 April 2023.
- Aḥmad, A. (1980). Kitāb (in Latvian). Pākistān Ṭelīvīzhan Kārporeshan. Archived from the original on 22 April 2023.
- Aḥmad, A. (1980). ʻAllāmah Iqbāl aur ham (in Latvian). Markaz-i Anjuman K̲h̲ādim al-Qurʼān. Archived from the original on 22 April 2023.
- Aḥmad, A. (1979). Musalmānon̲ par Qurʼān-i Majīd ke ḥuqūq (in Latvian). Markazī Anjuman K̲h̲ādim al-Qurʼān. Archived from the original on 22 April 2023.
- Aḥmad, A. (1978). Nabī-yi akram ... kā maqṣad-i baʻs̲at aur inqilāb-i Nabavī kā asāsī minhāj (in Latvian). Anjuman-i K̲h̲uddāmulqurʼān. Archived from the original on 22 April 2023.
- Aḥmad, A. (1978). Qurʼān-i ḥakīm kī suraton̲ ke maz̤āmīn kā ijmālī tajziyah al-Fātiḥah tā al-Kahaf (in Latvian). Maktabah-yi Markazī-i Anjuman-i K̲h̲uddāmulqurʼān. Archived from the original on 22 April 2023.
- Aḥmad, A. (1978). Nabī-yi Akram ṣallallāhu ʻalaihi va sallam kā maqṣad-i biʻs̲at aur inqilāb-i nabavī kā asāsī minhāj (in Latvian). Maktabah-yi Markazī Anjuman-i K̲h̲uddāmulqurʼān. Archived from the original on 22 April 2023.
- Aḥmad, A.; Jamīlurraḥmān, S. (1977). Shahīd-i maẓlūm: Ḥaz̤rat ʻUs̲mān Z̲ūnnūrain (in Latvian). Markazī Anjuman-i K̲h̲uddāmulqurʼān. Archived from the original on 22 April 2023.
- Aḥmad, A. (1973). Rāh-i najāt: sūrah-yi va-al-ʻaṣr kī raushanī men̲ (in Latvian). Anjuman-i K̲h̲uddāmulqurʼān. Archived from the original on 22 April 2023.
- Aḥmad, A. Sarafgandīm: yaʻnī Ḍākṭar Asrār Aḥmad, Amīr-i tanẓīm-i Islāmī kī voh taqrīr ... (in Latvian). Markazī Maktabah-yi Tanẓīm-i Islāmī. Archived from the original on 22 April 2023.
- Aḥmad, A. Mut̤āliʻyah Qurʼān hakim kā muntak̲hib niṣāb (in Latvian). Archived from the original on 22 April 2023.
- Aḥmad, A. Nabe akram (s.a.w.) kā maqsadi bʻas̲at (in Latvian). Archived from the original on 22 April 2023.
- Aḥmad, A. Islām kī nashāʼat-i saniyah: karne kā aṣal kām (in Latvian). Markazī Anjuman K̲h̲ādim al-Qurʼān. Archived from the original on 22 April 2023.

== See also ==
- Naeem Siddiqui
- Tanzeem-e-Islami
- Anti-sectarian movements in Islam
