= Muhammad Hanif Nadvi =

Pakistani Islamic scholar

Maulana Muhammad Hanif Nadvi
- مولانا محمد حنیف ندوی
- Born: 10 June 1908; Gujranwala, British India
- Died: 12 July 1987 (aged 79); Lahore
- Education: Nadwatul Ulama
- Occupations: Islamic scholar, theologian, Quranic commentator
- Organization(s): Institute of Islamic Culture, Lahore

Muhammad Hanif Nadvi (10 June 1908 – 12 July 1987) was an Islamic scholar, theologian, and commentator of the Qur'an from Pakistan.

== Biography ==
Nadvi was born on 10 June 1908 in Gujranwala, British India (now Pakistan). When he completed his primary education in the home town, his father gave him under the discipleship of Maulana Ismail Salafi, so he could receive the education of language and literature from him. Salafi saw the true thirst for knowledge in his student and sent him to Nadwatul Ulama, Lucknow, in 1925. Staying there, Nadvi completed his studies of the Qur'an, tafsir, hadith, fiqh, logic, etc. from the best scholars of the time. His proficiency in Arabic reached the level that he gave a speech in Arabic for half an hour on the subject of The Impact of the Qur'an on Arabic Literature in a meeting held in Kanpur in the presence of scholars like Hakeem Ajmal Khan and Syed Sulaiman Nadvi. At the age of 24, he started writing a commentary on the Qur'an, Siraj-ul-Bayan.

Nadvi mastered the English language through his personal efforts and familiarized himself with modern Western philosophy. He joined the Institute of Islamic Culture in 1951. At that time, the director of the institution was the philosopher Khalifa Abdul Hakim. Staying in his company, Nadvi's philosophical skills got sharpened and he remained associated with the institution for life. He wrote several valuable books on the Quran, Hadith, and Islamic philosophy. He also remained a member of the Council of Islamic Ideology, Pakistan.

Nadvi died on 12 July 1987 in Lahore.

== Works ==
- Tafseer Siraj ul Bayan (5 volumes)
- Afkar ibn e Khaldoon
- Afkar ibn e Khaldoon
- Aqliyat e Ibn e Taimmiya
- Mirzaiat – Naey Zawion Se
- Ta'alimaat e Ghazali
- Chehra e Nubwat
- Musalmano Ke Aqayed o Afkar
- Mutala e Quran
- Muatala e Hadith
- Masla e Ijtehad
- Sarguzasht e Ghazali
- Qadeem Unani Falsafa
