= Muhammad Afzal Hussain Qadri =

Pakistani entomologist and Pakistan Movement activist (1912–1974)

- محمد افضال حسین قادری
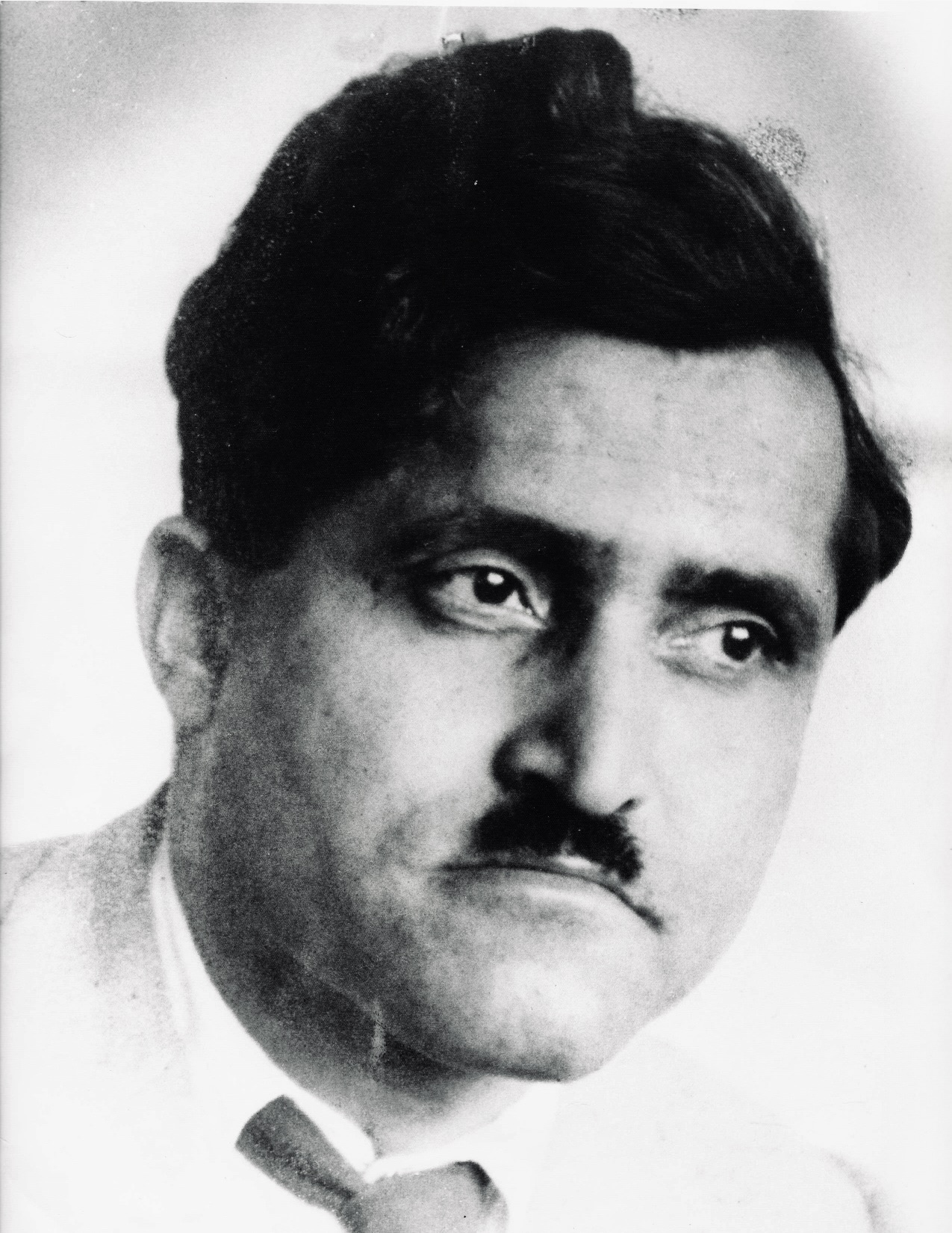
- Family portrait, c. 1950
- Born: February 7, 1912; Budaun, United Provinces, British India
- Died: December 6, 1974 (aged 62); Karachi, Pakistan
- Citizenship: Pakistan
- Education: Aligarh Muslim University, University of Cambridge
- Known for: Insect morphology; development of entomological research in Pakistan
- Awards: Pakistan Academy of Sciences Gold Medal (1968); Presidential Gold Medal (1969)
- Scientific career
- Fields: Entomology
- Institutions: Aligarh Muslim University, University of Karachi
- Academic advisors: Augustus Daniel Imms
- Author abbrev. (zoology): M. A. H. Qadri

Muhammad Afzal Hussain Qadri (7 February 1912 – 6 December 1974), often cited in scientific literature as M. A. H. Qadri, was a Pakistani entomologist, academic administrator, and political activist who played a significant role in the Pakistan Movement. He was a founding figure in modern entomological research in South Asia and served as the first Professor Emeritus of the University of Karachi.

== Early life and education ==
Muhammad Afzal Hussain Qadri was born on 7 February 1912 in Budaun, United Provinces, British India.

He studied at Aligarh Muslim University, earning a Master of Science degree in 1932. In 1936, he completed a doctorate in entomology at Aligarh, becoming among the earliest recipients of a PhD in science from the university. He later undertook advanced research at the University of Cambridge, receiving a second PhD in 1938 under the supervision of entomologist A. D. Imms. Aligarh Muslim University later awarded him its first Doctor of Science (DSc) degree for his published research.

== Academic career ==
Qadri began his academic career at Aligarh Muslim University in 1933 as a lecturer in zoology. After completing his doctoral studies in Cambridge, he returned to Aligarh and established a school of entomology that was later recognized by the Government of India as a pioneering center in the discipline.

Following the creation of Pakistan, he relocated to Karachi in 1950 and helped develop the University of Karachi. He served as Head of the Department of Zoology (from 1952), Professor of Zoology (from 1954), and first Dean of the Faculty of Science until 1973. After retirement, he was appointed the university’s first Professor Emeritus.

== Scientific contributions ==
Qadri’s research focused on insect morphology, particularly piercing and sucking mechanisms in Hemiptera and comparative genital morphology in Orthoptera. His work was cited in international entomology textbooks, and he supervised multiple doctoral researchers who later became senior academics. Under his leadership, new biological science departments were established at the University of Karachi, including genetics, microbiology, and marine biology.

== Role in the Pakistan Movement ==
Qadri was active in Muslim political thought during the late colonial period and served as Secretary of the All-India Muslim Education Committee in 1945 on the appointment of Muhammad Ali Jinnah.

=== Aligarh Scheme ===
In 1939, Qadri and Professor Zafarul Hasan co-authored The Problem of Indian Muslims and Its Solution, proposing a constitutional scheme arguing that Muslims constituted a distinct nation entitled to political self-determination.

Their findings were compiled in The Problems of Indian Muslims and Its Solution (1939), which was presented to Muhammad Ali Jinnah.

Historian Ayesha Jalal describes the Aligarh Scheme as one of the most detailed proposals addressing the problem of reconciling Muslim national identity with territorial sovereignty, emphasising Qadri’s role in articulating the political dilemma faced by Muslims in minority provinces. In a later study, Jalal notes that Qadri characterized the scheme as the product of sustained reflection on whether Muslims could live as a free and honorable nation within a unified India, highlighting the intellectual depth of the Aligarh proposals.

Historian R. J. Moore observes that Jinnah’s 1940 Lahore address drew upon arguments advanced by the Aligarh group, including Qadri, particularly in rejecting the notion that religious differences between Hindus and Muslims were merely superficial.

== Professional affiliations ==
Qadri was a founding fellow and later president (1970–1972) of the Zoological Society of Pakistan. He was elected Fellow of several scientific bodies, including the Royal Entomological Society (London), Zoological Society of London, Pakistan Academy of Sciences, Pakistan Association for the Advancement of Science, and Scientific Society of Pakistan.

He served on national committees including the Pakistan Central Cotton Committee, the Agricultural Research Council of Pakistan, the National Wildlife Committee, and the Medical Reforms Commission, and held positions on the Senate, Syndicate, and Academic Council of the University of Karachi.

== Awards and honors ==
- Pakistan Academy of Sciences Gold Medal(1968)
- Presidential Gold Medal for excellence in teaching (1969)
- Appointed first Professor Emeritus, University of Karachi (1973)
- Honorary Fellowship, Entomological Society of Pakistan (1973)
- Commemorative postage stamp issued by Pakistan Post (1999)

== Death and legacy ==
Muhammad Afzal Hussain Qadri died on 6 December 1974 in Karachi at the age of 63. He is remembered for his contributions to entomology and for his role in shaping Muslim political discourse in late colonial India.

== Selected works ==
- Qadri, M. A. H. (1949). On the morphology and post-embryonic development of the male genitalia and their ducts in Hemiptera (Insecta). J. Zool. Soc. India, 1(2), 129-143.
- Qadri, M.A.H. (1940), ON THE DEVELOPMENT OF THE GENITALIA AND THEIR DUCTS OF ORTHOPTEROID INSECTS. Transactions of the Royal Entomological Society of London, 90: 121-175. https://doi.org/10.1111/j.1365-2311.1940.tb02251.x
- Zafarul Hasan, S., & Qadri, M. A. H. (1939). The problem of Indian Muslims and its solution. Aligarh Muslim University Press.
