= Zafarul =

Zafarul is a given name. Notable people with the given name include:

- Zafarul Islam Khan (born 1948), Indian journalist
- Syed Zafarul Hasan (1885–1949), Pakistani philosopher.
