= Biological Society of Pakistan =

- Industry: Biological sciences
- Founded: 1949 in Lahore, Pakistan
- Founder: Pakistan Association for the Advancement of Science

The Biological Society of Pakistan (BSP), also known as the Biological Society of Pakistan, Lahore (BSPL) is an organization in Pakistan established to promote the learning and research of biology in the country. It was founded in 1949 by Dr. Sultan Ahmad, Dr. Muzzafar Ahmed, Dr. Abu Bakar, Prof. Ahsan-ul-Islam, and Prof. Waiz Hussain Bokhari, and is hosted by Government College in Lahore.

The society receives funding from the Pakistan Science Foundation, part of the Ministry of Science and Technology.

== History ==
The Biological Society of Pakistan was founded in 1949 under the auspices of the Pakistan Association for the Advancement of Science, by a group of biologists in Lahore, working at the zoology and botany departments of Government College and Punjab University, which at the time were housed in the same Government College building.

The society's founding charter states the objective of promoting the cause of biological sciences in Pakistan, by publishing an academic journal (to be called Pakistan Journal of Biology), holding meetings, seminars and conferences to discuss biological problems, and creating facilities for original research in biological sciences. The society was registered on 10 April 1955 under the Societies Act XXI of 1860 of the Punjab, with an initial membership of 142 scientists from across Pakistan. Mian Afzal Hussain was elected as the first president, with Nazir Ahmad as secretary and Sher Ahmad Lodhi as its treasurer.

In 1955, the scientists and teachers working in the botany and zoology department at Government College and Punjab University decided to rename the society the Biological Society of Pakistan and to publish a regular research journal. Ahsan-ul-Islam was assigned the job of framing the bylaws of the society and M. Saleem was assigned the task of enrolling the members of the society. Sultan Ahmad with Muzaffar Ahmad took over responsibility for the publication of the journal.

== Events ==
The president of the society, Dr. Anwar Malik, spoke at the "First National Conference on Biology" at Government College, on 29 or 30 March 2002.

The society collaborated with the Eco-Science Foundation at Government College University (GCU) to organize the third International Conference on Biosciences (ICBS-2018), focusing on sustainable food production, for three days starting on 9 May 2018. The chief organizer was GCU Professor Emeritus Dr. Ikram ul Haq, who was also the general secretary of the society.

The society collaborated with the Centre for Plant Sciences and Biodiversity of the University of Swat, the Higher Education Commission, and the Pakistan Science Foundation to organize the three-day 5th International Conference on "Advances in Biosciences: Bridging the Gap between Research and Sustainable Development Goals" on 24–26 May 2022. The organizing committee for the conference included the society's president, Prof. Dr. Anwar Malik, and its Secretary-General, Prof. Dr. Ikram-Ul-Haq.

== Publications ==
=== Biologia ===
The society's official journal is Biologia, established in June 1955 as a collaboration between the departments of Botany and Zoology at Government College University, with its first editor-in-chief being Sultan Ahmad. It is published semi-annually, in June and December of each year. It has a print and linking ISSN of 0006-3096 and an electronic ISSN of 2313-206X. The content is in English, French, and German.

It is indexed in AcadOF, Aqua Sci. & Fish Abstr., Aquacult. Abstr., BiolAb / Biol. Abstr., Bioresearch Index, BIOSIS Prev, CabiAb/CABI, ChemAb / Chem. Abstr., CSA, Curr. Adv. Ecol. Sci., CurCont, Deep Sea Res. & Oceanogr. Abstr., EMBiology, Environ. Sci. Pol. Mgmt., Field Crop Abstr., GeoRef, Ghealth, Google Scholar, Herb. Abstr., Hort. Abstr., IBIDS, IBR, IBZ, INIS AtomInd, Pakistan Current Contents, Rev. Arom. & Med. Plants, Rev. Plant Path., SCI / Sci. Cit. Ind. (coverage dropped), SCOPUS, Sherpa Romeo, Soils & Fert., Summon, VINITI, and ZooRec.

=== Monographs ===
The society occasionally publishes monographs, the name of which is sometimes abbreviated as "Biol. Soc. Pak. Monogr."

Identifiers for the series include ISSN 0523-6614; Hunt Institute 84573; and OCLC 2541119, 477906928, 768034099, 183401970, and 1289018384.

They have published the following monographs as of 1998:

Number	Date	Author(s)	Title	Physical format	Contents	Library catalogs
1/I	1956 July 15	Sultan Ahmad	Fungi of West Pakistan	iii+126 pp. + folded map cloth-bound; 9½ in. by 7 in. / 25 cm. / 8vo	An annotated, comprehensive list of 1219 species (about being new records for the area) in standard taxonomic sequence, a bibliography, an index to genera, a complete host-index, and a large map of West Pakistan and adjoining areas. Includes 58 species of agarics and their allies.	
2/II	1958	Nazeer Ahmed Janjua, M. Maqsood Nasir, and Ghulam-Ullah Khan Chaudhry	The codling moth, Cydia pomonella (Linn.) in Baluchistan	iv+122 pp. + 9 plates 24 cm.	Includes 90 tables and 36 graphs about its distribution, host plants, nature and extent of damage, life and seasonal history, and natural enemies, based on 7 years of investigation from 1941 to 1947.	
3/III	1958–1959	Sultan Ahmad and Ralph Randles Stewart	Grasses of West Pakistan	vi+388 pp. paper-bound; 9½ in. by 7 in. / 25 cm. / 8vo	Has two parts: pp. 1–151 "Subfamily Panicoideae" (1958) and pp. 153–388 "Subfamily Pooideae" (1959). Contains keys to the tribes, genera and all 370 species of grasses recorded from Pakistan, with a short diagnosis for each tribe and genus, and a detailed description for each species, including the distribution record of where it is located, and the collector's name but not the collector's number. Has a "generous" number of misprints. Part 1 has 70 species in 17 genera of the Tribe Paniceae, 60 in 31 of Andropogoneae, and 3 in 3 of Maydeae, none of which are new. Part 2 has a key to the tribes of the Pooideae of Pakistan; the characteristics of each tribe are followed by a key to the genera; each genus has a description, which is followed by a key to the species if there are multiple; each species has a description and an explanation of its distribution for the area covered.	
4/IV		Sultan Ahmad	Polyporaceae of West Pakistan		Features about 120 species.	
5/V	1969 April 30	Sultan Ahmad	Fungi of West Pakistan, Supplement 1	iv+110 pp. 25 cm. / 8vo	Features over 1000 species: 20 myxomycetes, 8 phycomycetes, 320 ascomycetes, 135 basidiomycetes, and 547 deuteromycetes.	
6/VI	1972 April 4	Sultan Ahmad	Basidiomycetes of West Pakistan	[4]+iii/iv+141/154 pp. + 9 plates 22 cm. / 8vo	An aid to the identification of saprophytic basidiomycetous Fungi (except agarics and gasteromycetes). Has many gaps in areas covered, and does not discuss frequency of occurrence, ecological relationships, or economic importance. Uses the system of classification developed by Donk and Corner.	
7/VII	1978 March 20	Sultan Ahmad	Ascomycetes of Pakistan, part 1	vii+236 pp. paper-bound; 24 cm. / 8vo	Contains keys and a taxonomic treatment of all groups. Includes some line drawings (usually diagnostic) and occasional photographs. Has literature references for each major division (Hemiascomycetes, Plectomycetes, Pyrenomycetes, and Discomycetes). Generally uses then-modern classification. Proposes some new combinations and taxa.	
8/VIII	1978 March 20	Sultan Ahmad	Ascomycetes of Pakistan, part 2	iii/iv+144 pp. 24 cm. / 8vo		
9/IX	1980	Sultan Ahmad	Flora of the Panjab/Punjab: keys to genera and species, part 1: Monocotyledons	at least 209 pages 24 cm.		
10/X	1980	Sultan Ahmad	Flora of the Panjab/Punjab: keys to genera and species, part 2: Dicotyledons	at least 66 pages 24 cm.		
11/XI	1986	Abu Bakr (شکیل الرحمٰن)	On a collection of Siwalik Carnivora	at least 64 pages	Features 16 species, including Vishnucyon nagriensis, Sivaonyx minor, Lycaena felina, and Panthera dhokpathanensis.	
12/XII	1986	M. H. Bokhari and W. Frey	Species/spices and flavouring used in Iran and Pakistan	at least 45 pages and 13 plates		
13/XIII	1987	Fatima Mujib Bilquees/Bilqees (آمنہ ممتاز) and Aly Khan	Acanthocephala of fishes of Pakistan	28/57 pp. 24 cm.	Provides a general description of their morphology, physiology, biochemistry, and life-cycles, as well as descriptions of all 20 species recorded from fish in Pakistan, as well as a host-parasite list. Includes at least 38 figures, grouped in a special section.	
14/XIV/XIV	1987	Muhammad Sharif Khan and Rashida Tasnim	A field guide to the identification of herps of Pakistan, part I: Amphibia	28 pp.		
15/XV/XV	1990	Muhammad Sharif Khan and Rashida Tasnim	A field guide to the identification of herps of Pakistan, part II: Chelonia	at least 15 pages		
16/XVI/XVI	1990	M. H. Bokhari and M. Ashraf	Pulse crops of Pakistan			

=== Other works ===
The society also published Seventy five years History of Zoology by A. R. Shakoori and M. R. Mirza.
