= Anti-sectarian movements in Islam =

Islamic movements advocating rejection of sectarian identities

Anti-sectarian movements in Islam refers to contemporary religious trends that call upon Muslims to abandon sectarian labels such as Sunni, Shia, Deobandi, Barelvi and Ahl-e-Hadith, and to identify simply as "Muslim". These movements argue that sectarian identities are later historical developments that divide the ummah and conflict with Qur'anic injunctions against factionalism.

The phenomenon is especially visible in South Asia, where preachers such as Dr Israr Ahmad and Engineer Muhammad Ali Mirza promote Qur'an–Sunnah–based unity and reject denominational labels. They describe sectarianism as a major cause of conflict within Muslim societies.

== Overview ==
Anti-sectarian discourse emphasises:

- the unity of all Muslims as a single community,
- rejection of sect-specific titles,
- prioritisation of the Qur'an and authentic hadith,
- respect for both the Sahaba (companions of the Prophet) and the Ahl al-Bayt (Prophet's family),
- and criticism of clerical polemics that promote intra-Muslim hostility.

Preachers associated with this trend argue that sectarian identity is a human invention without scriptural basis. Mirza, for example, calls sect labels “divisive” and urges Muslims to identify simply as “Muslim”. Dr Israr Ahmad similarly held that Sunnis and Shias share the same core faith and should be regarded as fellow Muslims.

== Historical and intellectual context ==
Calls for transcending sectarianism have existed since early Islamic history, but modern anti-sectarian activism expanded during the 20th century. Reformist thinkers in South Asia, including Abul Kalam Azad and Maududi, stressed Muslim unity in response to colonial fragmentation and rising political sectarianism.

Contemporary anti-sectarian voices also draw on Qur'anic arguments against division, such as interpretations of Qur'an 6:159, which some use to criticise denominational self-classification.

== Contemporary figures ==
=== Dr Israr Ahmad ===
Dr Israr Ahmad (1932–2010), founder of Tanzeem-e-Islami, was a prominent advocate of Islamic unity. He argued that Sunnis and Shias “follow the same religion” and that theological differences should not lead to declaring each other unbelievers. He criticised sectarian clerics for promoting division for personal or institutional influence.

His writings such as Shia–Sunni Mufahama called for mutual understanding. His views received praise from some Shia leaders, including Maulana Kalbe Sadiq, for encouraging Sunni–Shia harmony.

=== Engineer Muhammad Ali Mirza ===
Engineer Muhammad Ali Mirza (b. 1977) is a popular Pakistani preacher who promotes a Qur'an–Sunnah methodology and rejection of sectarian labels. Through his Quran-o-Sunnah Research Academy and social media presence, he advocates identifying solely as “Muslim” and encourages direct engagement with scriptural sources.

Mirza has millions of followers online, but has also faced controversy. His critics claim he lacks formal seminary training and oversimplifies complex jurisprudential issues. He has been repeatedly targeted under Pakistan's blasphemy laws, including detentions and FIRs filed by sectarian groups.

== Related trends ==
Other movements and networks also promote unity-oriented interpretations of Islam. Some Sufi, Salafi and modernist groups denounce sectarian hostility, though their doctrinal approaches differ. In South Asia, Sunni–Shia joint events and ecumenical efforts occasionally draw on the works of unity-focused scholars.

== Criticism ==
Critics argue that:

- rejecting sect labels does not necessarily eliminate doctrinal bias,
- denouncing historical legal schools may lead to oversimplification,
- preachers without formal credentials may misinterpret complex issues,
- and confrontational styles may inadvertently deepen tensions.

Shia scholars responding to anti-sectarian claims note that sect classification can be justified as a means of preserving doctrinal clarity, not promoting division.
