= Islam Aur Mouseeqi =

1956 Urdu book by Maulana Jafar Shah Phulwarvi

- Author: Maulana Jafar Shah Phulwarvi
- Language: Urdu
- Genre: Religion
- Published: 1st edition: 1956; 2nd edition: June 1968
- Publisher: Institute of Islamic Culture, Lahore
- Publication place: Pakistan
- Pages: 343

Islam Aur Mouseeqi (Urdu: اسلام اور موسیقی), or Islam and Music, is a 1956 Urdu Islamic book by Maulana Jafar Shah Phulwarvi (ولانا جعفر شاہ پھلواروی). The book was published by the Institute of Islamic Culture, Lahore.

In Islam Aur Mouseeqi, the author asserts that, unlike the traditional view, music is allowed in Islam. To present his case, the author references many verses from the Quran, hadiths, and acts of the companions of the Prophet. It inspired some negative reaction.
