= Khalifa Abdul Hakim =

Pakistani philosopher

Khalifa Abdul Hakeem
- Born: 1 July 1893
- Died: 30 January 1959 (aged 65)
- Occupations: Philosopher, poet, critic, researcher, philologist, translator, and former professor of philosophy at Osmania University
- Website: khalifaabdulhakim.com

Khalifa Abdul Hakeem (1 July 1893 – 30 January 1959) was a Pakistani philosopher, poet, critic, researcher, philologist, translator, and former professor of philosophy at Osmania University. He was a former director of Islamic Culture Institute, Lahore.

== Biography ==
=== Family background ===
Khalifa belonged to the Lahori branch of the Dar family. The name was Abdul Hakeem, while Khalifa was used in the Kashmiri Dar family for a scholar or an able man, about which Munshi Muhammad Din Fauq wrote that: In the beginning, pashmina and duri baghi work was done frequently in this family and a fair number of people regularly acquired this art from this family. The elders of the family came to be called by the name of Khalifa, meaning teacher. This word "Khalifa" was the first part of the name of the members of this family. Khalifa Abdul Hakim's grandfather, Khalifa Ramzan Dar, was the owner of a small factory. Khalifa Abdul Hakim's father, Khalifa Abdul Rahman, was a staunch religious man of the old style. Khalifa Abd al-Rahman Salim al-Tabb, was a man of few words, modest, principled and believed in a clean society. He used to study Gulestan-i Saadi and Bustan-i Saadi extensively and used to recite the instructive parts of the books to his children. Therefore, this is why Khalifa Abdul Hakim was very young, but because he was brought up in this environment, he developed an attachment to Persian literature from his childhood. Khalifa Abd al-Hakim was born to the second wife of Khalifa Abd al-Rahman, who had Rahim Bibi. A real brother Abdul Ghani and a sister Amir Begum were alive till the early 1970s. There was also a half-brother and a half-sister older then all of them, brother Khalifa Ibrahim died in the 1920s, and the half sister khairnisa Bibi, who all of them loved very much died In 1950.

=== Date and place of birth ===
There is a difference in the date of birth of Khalifa Abdul Hakim. Muhammad Abdullah Qureshi and Bashir Ahmad Dar have written his date of birth as 12 July 1894. Munshi Muhammad Deen Fawq in History of the Nations of Kashmir and Mian Shamsuddin Sahib in his interview have stated his date of birth as 12 July 1894. But according to the entry of his date of birth during his employment at Osmania University, Khalifa Abdul Hakim was born on 1 July 1893 according to 8 Shawwal 1303 AH.

=== Education and literary career ===
Khalifa Abd al-Hakim had not yet embarked on higher education when his father Khalifa Abd al-Rahman died. After your father's death, your father's brothers refused to give the inheritance to Hakim Chacha and other uncles and aunts, due to which they all had to live in poverty for years.That is the time when family moved to Lahore. After losing his father's love, the responsibility of educating Khalifa Abdul Hakim fell on his mother alone. She was a patient, tolerant and wise woman. Due to poor financial conditions, mother started the old work of removing the husk from the paddy and did not leave any deficiency in the training of her children. At the same time he also started writing poetry, according to Munshi Muhammad Deen Fawq, Khalifa Abdul Hakeem's first poem was published in Kashmiri Magazine, Lahore. He was leading in the literary activities of the school. He was a good teacher and during this period his passion for studying Urdu literature and Persian literature reached its peak.

In the days when Khalifa Sahib passed his matriculation, there was a lot of interest and commitment to the educational movement of Sir Syed Ahmad Khan in Punjab and most of the elders of that time tried to educate their children in Aligarh. But on the contrary, probably due to financial difficulties, he enrolled in Forman Christian College, Lahore after matriculation and chose science subjects under the guidance of his brother-in-law Attaullah Butt, but he had no interest in science, that's why. After a few months you left the college and then moved to Aligarh. Selected Arts (Arts and Literature) subjects for first year examinations in Aligarh. After just five minutes of preparation in the first-year class, he became president of the debating union with a speech called "Fei al-Badihah."

After doing his FA from Aligarh, he joined St. Stephen's College, Delhi in mid-1912. Professor Hameed Ahmad Khan has stated that in 1913, he came to Delhi after graduating from Allahabad University because at that time Aligarh College was affiliated to Allahabad University and Aligarh was given the status of a Muslim University. His philosophy teacher was Mr. Sain (who later became the registrar), he was an admirer of his intelligence and there were only five or six boys in the philosophy class, so he often visited Khalifa Sahib to teach the small class. He used to visit the residence and teach. In 1915, Khalifa Abdul Hakeem obtained his BA degree and set a record by coming first in philosophy at Punjab University, Lahore.

After BA from University of the Punjab, he passed MA (Philosophy) from St. Stephen's College, Delhi in 1917 and once again Khalifa Abdul Hakeem came first in Punjab.

=== Professional career ===
In August 1919, on the recommendation of Allama Muhammad Iqbal, he became Assistant Professor of Philosophy at the newly established Osmania University in the Hyderabad, Deccan. In 1922, he went to Germany and in 1925 he received his doctorate in philosophy from the University of Heidelberg. His research paper was titled Metaphysics of Rumi. After completing his PhD, he returned to Hyderabad Deccan and was appointed as a professor of philosophy and head of the department at Osmania University. In 1943, he moved to Kashmir to become the principal of Amar Singh College, Srinagar, where he was later appointed as the director of education. He resigned in 1947 and came back to Hyderabad Deccan where he was appointed as the Dean Faculty of Arts in Osmania University. He moved to Lahore in 1949 after the Indian occupation of Hyderabad Deccan. In February 1950, with the efforts of Dr. Khalifa Abdul Hakeem, Institute of Islamic Culture was established in Lahore and he was appointed as its first founder director.

=== Death ===
Dr. Khalifa Abdul Hakeem died of cardiac arrest on 30 January 1959 in Karachi. He is buried in Miani Sahib Cemetery.

== Books ==
=== English ===
Year	Title	Description
1939	The Metaphysics of Rumi	A philosophical study of Rumi's thought and its metaphysical implications.
1944	Islamic Ideology: The Fundamental Beliefs and Principles of Islam and Their Application to Practical Life	An exposition of the core beliefs and moral framework of Islam, emphasizing its applicability to modern life.
1945	The Prophet and His Message	A philosophical and spiritual account of the life and mission of Prophet Muhammad, highlighting his universal message.
1959	Iqbal and Mulla	Comparative study of Muhammad Iqbal and other classical and modern Islamic thinkers.
1961	Islam and Communism	A critique of Communism from an Islamic philosophical and ethical perspective.

=== Urdu ===
Year	Title (Urdu)	Title (English translation)	Description
1942	اقبال اور ملا	Iqbal and the Orthodox Scholars	Discusses Iqbal's thought in contrast to traditionalist religious scholars.
1945	افکارِ اقبال	The Thoughts of Iqbal	A study of Allama Iqbal's philosophical and poetic ideas.
1950	مبادیٔ تعلیم	Principles of Education	A treatise on the aims and philosophy of education from an Islamic perspective.
1954	فلسفۂ اقبال	Philosophy of Iqbal	A detailed examination of Iqbal's philosophical system and intellectual contributions.
1955	اقبال کا علمِ کلام	Iqbal's Theology	Focuses on Iqbal's contributions to Islamic theology and his reinterpretation of kalām (Islamic scholastic theology).
