= Quran Aur Ilm-e-Jadeed =

1959 Urdu book by Rafi Uddin

- Author: Dr. Rafi Uddin
- Language: Urdu
- Genre: Theology
- Published: 1959
- Publisher: Institute of Islamic Culture, Lahore
- Publication place: Pakistan
- Pages: 561
- ISBN: 978-8174356703

Quran Aur Ilm-e-Jadeed (Urdu: قرآن اور علم جدید) is a 1959 Urdu book by Muhammad Rafiuddin. The book was first published by the Institute of Islamic Culture, Lahore. The book has been translated into English under the title Quran and Modern Knowledge and has been included in the master's degree course at the University of Punjab.

== Synopsis ==
Quran Aur Ilm-e-Jadeed presents a comparative study of Quran and the modern sciences for both conformities and contradictions. The book contains discussions on six modern theories in the light of Quran: the theory of evolution by Charles Darwin, theory of Instinct by William McDougall, the theory of Unconscious mind by Sigmund Freud, the theory Love of Superiority by Alfred W. Adler, Socialism by Karl Marx, and the Nationalism by Machiavelli.
