= Ainslie Embree =

Canadian indologist and historian (1921–2017)

Ainslie Thomas Embree (/ˈɛmbriː/; January 1, 1921 – June 6, 2017) was a Canadian Indologist and historian. He was considered a leading scholar of modern Indian history and played a seminal role in the introduction of South Asian studies into US college and secondary education curricula. In addition to his academic work, Embree made significant contributions to peace efforts between India and Pakistan as a member of the Kashmir Study Group and the Council on Foreign Relations, and acted as a consultant to the US diplomatic and intelligence communities. He has been described as a "tireless advocate for greater understanding between the US and India" who was also known for his seminal insights into the complex relationship of religion and nationalism that have influenced religious scholarship in this country.

== Early life and education ==
Embree was born in the small village of Sunnyside, near Port Hawkesbury, on the island of Cape Breton in Nova Scotia, Canada, where he spent his childhood. He was one of 5 children (Vivian, Gerald, Jesse, and Elliott) born to Ira Thomas Embree and his wife, Margaret (née Langley). At the age of 16, he earned a scholarship to attend Dalhousie University in Halifax, earning his Bachelor of Arts degree in 1941. Although he considered himself a pacificist, he joined the Royal Canadian Air Force and was assigned to Britain's Royal Air Force in England, serving as a navigator (Pilot Officer rank) on Halifax bombers flying nighttime missions during World War II. On his return home, he continued his studies at Dalhousie University and at Pine Hill Divinity Hall (now the Atlantic School of Theology). He was ordained as a minister in the United Church of Canada in 1946, and subsequently was awarded a fellowship to pursue advanced studies at Union Theological Seminary in New York City.

It was at Union that he met and married a fellow student, Suzanne Harpole. After their marriage in 1947, they moved back to Nova Scotia where they both pursued graduate studies at Dalhousie. He worked as an advisor for returning veterans and secretary of the Maritime Provinces Christian Students Association while his wife earned her Diploma in Education. The couple then accepted positions through the United Church of Canada to teach in India at Indore Christian College: he taught European history and acted as a college administrator; she taught sociology. They remained in Indore for 10 years, from 1947 to 1957; their children (Ralph Thomas and Margaret Louise) were both born in India.

During their decade in India, Embree became increasingly interested in and committed to understanding the rich history and culture of the subcontinent. In a 2009 interview with Mark Juergensmeyer of the University of California at Santa Barbara, Embree noted that he and his wife had been drawn to teach in India because, as young people who had served during World War II (Suzanne had served in the US Navy WAVES as a cryptanalyst), they were inspired by Mahatma Gandhi's messages of peace.

Decades later, in a reflection on the India-US relationship since India gained independence that was originally published in the New India Digest in 2007, Embree observed, "Going to teach in India meant a chance to be involved in what seemed then, and still does fifty years later, the most fascinating event in twentieth century history."

In 1957, Embree was offered a position at Columbia University, to work with the noted sinologist Wm. Theodore de Bary in establishing an independent program within the Department of History that would be dedicated the study of the subcontinent. While helping to create what became one of the world's most highly regarded programs for South Asian studies, Embree received his PhD in history in 1960.

Embree remained at Columbia University for most of his academic career, apart from an appointment to the history faculty at Duke University (1969–1973). He chaired the history department and served in a number of other administrative posts at Columbia, including Acting Dean of the School of International and Public Affairs. Nevertheless, his commitment to South Asian studies was not limited to the classroom. He returned to India frequently for study trips, and for two years served as Cultural Counselor in the US Embassy at Delhi during the administration of US President Jimmy Carter. He retired in 1991, but continued to write and teach at Columbia, Brown University and the Johns Hopkins School of Advanced International Studies. He served as consultant to the American ambassador in India, Frank Wisner, in 1994–1995.

== Professional accomplishments ==
Embree was Professor of History, Columbia University, 1958–1991. While at Columbia, he served as Director of Contemporary Civilization of the undergraduate Asian civilization program; as Chairman of the Middle East Languages and Cultures Department and the History Department; as Director of the Southern Asian Institute; and as Acting Dean of the School of International and Public Affairs. He began his teaching career in India, at Indore Christian College, an affiliated college of Agra University, 1948–1958; he also taught at Duke University from 1969 to 1973 and, after his retirement from Columbia in 1991, he continued his scholarly work, teaching at Columbia (where he continued as emeritus professor), Brown University and the Johns Hopkins School of Advanced International Studies.

From 1978–1980, Embree served as the counselor for cultural affairs at the American Embassy, New Delhi, and from 1994–1995, he served as consultant to the American ambassador in India, Frank Wisner.

Embree was a fellow of Saint Antony's College of the University of Oxford. A prolific writer, he was editor-in-chief of the four-volume Encyclopedia of Asian History (1989) and editor of the revised Sources of Indian Tradition (1988), Asia in Western and World History (with Carol Gluck, 1997), and India's World and U.S. Scholars: 1947–1997 (with others, 1998). Professor Embree also has authored Imagining India: Essays on Indian History (1989), Utopias in Conflict: Religion and Nationalism in India (1990), and India's Search for National Identity (1988) His last book, Frontiers Into Borders: Defining South Asia States 1757-1857 (2020) was published posthumously. He has contributed chapters to many books on India and Southern Asia.

At Columbia, Embree helped develop a broad-based study program on Asia and integrated Indian and Asian studies into the Columbia College Core Curriculum. His 1958 book, Sources of Indian Tradition, is widely considered the core text of the intellectual history of South Asian civilizations.

He served on committees of many other institutions dealing with South Asia, including the Woodrow Wilson Center, the Library of Congress, and the United States Department of Health, Education, and Welfare (since renamed the Department of Health and Human Services). Embree was an active member of the Kashmir Study Group and the Council on Foreign Relations, and was a member of the Columbia University Society of Senior Scholars. He was the President of the Taraknath Das Foundation, which awards fellowships to Indian students doing graduate studies in American universities. The Association of Indians and Americans honored Embree in 1982 for his ″unique contribution to greater understanding of the peoples of India and America.″

== Awards and honours ==
Embree was awarded multiple citations and honorary degrees, including honorary Doctor of Letters from Columbia University in 2009. One of the citations of which he was most proud, however, was Columbia University's Mark Van Doren Award (1985), a student-selected commendation to a professor "who has distinguished himself in scholarship and teaching and who possesses...humanity, devotion to the truth, and inspiring leadership."

== Publications ==
- with Friedrich Wilhelm (indologist) Indien, Fischer Weltgeschicht Band 17, 1967
- Charles Grant and the British Rule in India, London: G. Allene 1962
- Editor with S. M. Ikram: Muslim civilisation in India, New York 1964
- Editor The Hindu Tradition, New York: Modern Library 1966
- Editor: Encyclopedia of Asian History, Collier/Macmillan 1989
- Editor: Sources of Indian Tradition, Columbia University Press, 2. Auflage 1988
- Editor with Carol Gluck: Asia in Western and World History: a guide for teaching, Armonk (New York): M. E. Sharpe1997
- Imagining India: Essays on Indian History, Oxford University Press 1989
- Utopias in Conflict: Religion and Nationalism in India, University of California Press 1990
- India's Search for National Identity, Knopf 1972
- Editor with others: India's worlds and U.S. scholars, 1947–1997, New Delhi, American Institute of Indian Studies 1998
- with Mark C. Carnes: Defining a Nation: India on the eve of independence, 1945, W. W. Norton 2013.
- Frontiers Into Borders: Defining South Asian States 1757-1857, Oxford University Press 2020
