= Shujauddin Shaikh =

Ameer of Tanzeem-e-Islami

Shujauddin Shaikh شجاع الدین شیخ

3rd Ameer of Tanzeem-e-Islami
- Incumbent
- Assumed office 8 August 2020
- Preceded by: Akif Saeed

Nigraan Anjuman Khuddam-ul-Quran Sindh
- Incumbent
- Assumed office 2020
- Preceded by: Akif Saeed

Programs Director The Ilm Foundation

Personal life
- Born: 29 September 1974 (age 51) Karachi, Sindh, Pakistan
- Main interest(s): Islamic philosophy, Quran and Sunnah
- Notable work: Ham aur Hamara Ghar
- Education: University of Karachi, Islamic Studies

Religious life
- Religion: Islam
- Denomination: Sunni
- Movement: Tanzeem-e-Islami

Muslim leader
- Awards: Commendation Certificate - Government of Punjab, Pakistan

Military service
- Website: Tanzeem-e-Islami website

Shujauddin Shaikh is the current Ameer (leader) of Tanzeem-e-Islami since August 2020.

== Early life and education ==
Shujauddin Shaikh was born in Karachi. He started his professional studies in chartered accountancy (CA) and he completed his 4-year audit training and internship from A. F. Ferguson & Co. Chartered Accountants in 2001.

Shujauddin Shaikh took a few basic Arabic courses from Karachi in 1989. He obtained his master's degree in Islamic Studies from the University of Karachi in 1996.

== Tanzeem-e-Islami ==
In 1998 he joined Tanzeem-e-Islami as a member (rafiq).

After joining Tanzeem-e-Islami he then completed the one year Qur’anic learning course (Raju Illal Qur’an course) in 2002 from Qur’an Academy, Karachi, established by Dr. Israr Ahmed

He has delivered lectures in several countries including United Kingdom, Australia, Hong Kong, Oman, United Arab Emirates. and Saudi Arabia. He also organized training(Tarbiyah) courses for rufuqa overseas.

Shujauddin Shaikh has also been supervising the development of a comprehensive syllabus of Qur’anic teachings (from 2009 to 2020) for students of educational institutions, which consists of complete translation and exposition of the Holy Qur’an that is agreed upon by all the schools of religious thought and approved by the Federal Ministry of Education, Government of Pakistan.

== Ameer of Tanzeem e Islami ==
After a process of consultations initiated by the former Ameer of Tanzeem-e-Islami, Hafiz Aakif Saeed, on the issue of the future Presidency of Tanzeem-e-Islami, Shujauddin Shaikh's name came to the forefront in the Majlis-e-Shoora of Tanzeem-e-Islami held on Saturday 8 August 2020. He was appointed as the new Ameer of Tanzeem-e-Islami on the same day, by a majority decision taken by the Majlis-e-Shoora of Tanzeem-e-Islami. Currently he is serving as an Ameer of Tanzeem-e-Islami.

== See also ==
- Tanzeem-e-islami
- Dr Israr Ahmed
- Hafiz Akif Saeed
