= Tanzeem-e-Islami =

Islamic organization in Pakistan

- Tanzeem-e-Islami Pakistan
- تنظیمِ اسلامی
- Abbreviation: TI
- Formation: 1975; 51 years ago
- Founder: Israr Ahmed
- Type: Religious organization
- Purpose: Pan-Islamism; Sunni Islam
- Headquarters: Lahore, Pakistan
- Location: Pakistan
- Ameer: Shujauddin Shaikh
- Website: www.tanzeem.org

Tanzeem-e-Islami (Urdu: تنظیمِ اسلامی) is a Pakistani Islamic organisation that advocates the implementation of the Sharia, Quran and Sunnah in the social, cultural, legal, political, and economic spheres of life; And the "refutation of the misleading thoughts and philosophy of modernity".

The organization was formed by author and Islamic scholar Israr Ahmed in 1975 following his break with the Jamaat-e-Islami (JI) party in 1957, after the JI entered electoral politics in Pakistan.

Tanzeem-e-Islami has emerged as a "strong conservative force" within Pakistan. It opposes the development of a "modern secular curriculum" in universities, "friendly relations with the United States", and the influx of "Western values and vices" into Pakistan. While it supports jihad, it emphasizes the need for "passive resistance and perseverance", to first gain a "substantial foothold" and build momentum in society. While primarily active in Pakistan, TI has developed "affiliates based in the Indo-Pakistani Muslim communities in North America and Europe".

== History and activities ==
=== Foundations and early activism ===
Tanzeem-e-Islami was founded in 1975. When the TI was founded, it was a traditional Islamic organization. The founder, Israr Ahmed, shared his views on the Quran and Sunnah with supporters of the TI. The TI initially had only a few supporters. The influence of the Tanzeem-e-Islami only increased after the coup of July 5, 1977 by the Pakistani Chief of Staff Muhammad Zia-ul-Haq.

In 1975, 103 people attended its first event. Of these, 62 joined the Tanseem-e-Islami. In 1992 the TI had 1,778 members and a further 234 members in the Middle East. The women's department at TI was founded in 1983. In 1990 it had 122 members.

=== Television and influence on public ===
Israr Ahmed's first television show was called "Al-Kitab" and was broadcast during Ramadan 1978. Ahmed's other television programs were "Allf Lam Meem", "Rasul Kamil", "Umm ul Kitab" and "Al-Huda". These TV shows were broadcast across Pakistan. Pakistani President Zia-ul-Haq campaigned for Israr Ahmed to receive a weekly program on state television PTV. Ahmed's television show was one of the first in which an Islamic clergyman gave lessons about Islam. Israr Ahmed complained that, in his opinion, there were too few women wearing headscarves in the audience of his show. Zia-ul-Haq instructed the Ministry of Broadcasting that newscasters should only use subtle make-up on television. In 1983, Israr Ahmed spoke out in favor of establishing a worldwide Caliphate. He surprised the audience with controversial statements about cricket in Pakistan.

Cricket is making Pakistanis ignore their religious obligations ... I am convinced that cricket matches should not be shown on TV. ... Even after the showing of matches on TV is banned, only men should be allowed to go to the stadium to watch these matches.

— Israr Ahmed, statement made during his TV broadcast

The episode with the statement about the cricket games was not broadcast on TV and his show was temporarily suspended. Israr Ahmed protested. However, he did not lose his following.

=== Presence ===
The TI had two locations in 1994, one in Sakkar and one in Islamabad and two international locations, one in Toronto and one in Chicago.

The TI operates madrasa in Karachi, Lahore and Multan.

=== Valentine's Day ===
In 2013, the TI called for a boycott of Valentine's Day and put up posters all over Pakistan, "asking young people to say no to Valentine's Day because it promoted obscenity and contradicted the teachings of Islam."

=== Khilafa ===
In 2016, the Pakistani authorities instructed the TI to cease efforts to establish a worldwide caliphate.

== Ameers (leadership) ==
=== Dr Israr Ahmed (1975–2002) ===
Dr. Israr Ahmed founded Tanzeem-e-Islami in April 1975. He was the Ameer of Tanzeem until 2002, when for health reasons he requested the Majlis-e-Shura of Tanzeem-e-Islami to choose another Ameer and resign from the Amarat of Tanzeem.

=== Hafiz Akif Saeed (2002–2020) ===
Hafiz Akif Saeed, was the second Ameer and the second son of Israr Ahmed. He was the Ameer of Tanzeem till 8 August 2020. Due to serious health issues he requested the Majlis-e-Shura to choose another Ameer and resign from the Amarat of Tanzeem.

=== Shujauddin Sheikh (2020–present) ===
After a process of consultations initiated by Aakif Saeed on the issue of the future Imaarat of Tanzeem-e-Islami, Shujauddin Shaikh’s name came to the forefront in the Majlis-e-Shura of Tanzeem-e-Islami held on 8 August 2020. He was appointed as the new Ameer of Tanzeem-e-Islami on the same day by a majority decision of the Majlis-e-Shura.

== List Of Emirs ==
No.	Name	Term
1	Dr Israr Ahmed	1975–2002
2	Hafiz Akif Saeed	2002–2020
3	Shujauddin Sheikh	2020–present

== Controversies ==
=== 1995 coup attempt against Benazir Bhutto ===
Major General Zahirul Islam Abbasi, one of the masterminds of the 1995 coup attempt against Benazir Bhutto, was said to be influenced by Amin Minhas, a retired Major who became an Islamic scholar and back then the head of Tanzeem-e-Islami's Islamabad chapter.

=== Links with militant groups ===
While the organization itself has repeatedly affirmed that it stands against violence, some of its members have been involved in jihadist militancy, like Mufti Habibullah, who had been running madrasas in Karachi and Hyderabad, and Prof. Mushtaq, former teacher at the University of Karachi's Department of Islamic Studies, who were both caught in Balochistan in 2017 for their links with Ansarul Sharia Pakistan (ASP), while other TI activists have also been linked to Islamic State of Iraq and Syria (ISIS) and al-Qaeda in the Indian Subcontinent (AQIS).

== See also ==
- Dr Israr Ahmed
- Jamaat-e-Islami Pakistan
- Majlis-e-Ahrar-e-Islam
