= Muhammad Rafiuddin =

Pakistani philosopher and educationist

- محمد رفیع الدین
- Born: Muhammad Rafiuddin; 1 January 1904; Jammu, British India
- Died: 29 November 1969 (age 65); Karachi, Pakistan
- Education: Oriental College, Lahore
- Occupations: Philosopher; researcher; educationist; Iqbalist
- Years active: 1929–1969

Muhammad Rafiuddin (1904 – 1969) was a Pakistani philosopher, researcher, educationist, and Iqbalist. He authored several books on philosophy, education, and Iqbaliat.

== Early life and education ==
Rafiuddin was born in Jammu, British India, on 1 January 1904. He received his intermediate education in science and earned an honours degree in Persian. He earned a master's degree in Arabic in 1929. In 1949, he earned his Ph.D. degree in philosophy and in 1965, his Doctor of Literature in educational philosophy.

== Career ==
Rafiuddin began his career by teaching Arabic and Persian at Sri Pratap College in Srinagar from 1929 to 1932 and at Prince of Wales College in Jammu from 1933 to 1946, where he also wrote the highly regarded book Ideology of the Future. Later, he was awarded a Ph.D degree for the book under the supervision of Sarvepalli Radhakrishnan, William Lillie and Syed Zafarul Hasan. In 1946, he was chosen to be the principal of the Sri Karan Singh College in Mirpur, where he served for a year.

In the years 1948–1949, Rafiuddin worked as a research officer in the department of Islamic Reconstruction, and in the years 1950–1953, he did the same at the Institute of Islamic Culture. He served as the Iqbal Academy Pakistan's director from 1953 to 1965.

He established the All Pakistan Islamic Education Congress in 1966 after leaving the Iqbal Academy.

== Death ==
Rafiuddin died in a car accident in Karachi on 29 November 1969.

== Scholarly works ==
=== Books ===
- Ideology of the Future
- Manifesto of Islam
- First Principles of Education
- Fallacy of Marxism
- The Meaning and Purpose of Islamic Research
- Quran Aur Ilm-e-Jadeed (in Urdu)
- Hikmat-e-Iqbal (in Urdu)

=== Periodicals and journals ===
- Hikmat-e-Quran
- Islamic Education
