= Akif Saeed =

Former Ameer of Tanzeem-e-Islami

Hafiz Akif Saeed حافظ عاکف سعید

2nd Ameer of Tanzeem-e-Islami
- In office 2002–2020
- Preceded by: Israr Ahmed
- Succeeded by: Shujauddin Shaikh

Personal life
- Born: 1 January 1958 (age 68) Sahiwal, Pakistan
- Parent: Israr Ahmed (father)
- Main interest(s): Islamic philosophy, Quran and Sunnah, realism, rationalism
- Notable work: Allama Iqbal Ki Aakhri Khwahish
- Education: Government College, Lahore, University of the Punjab, Islamic Studies
- Website: Tanzeem-e-Islami website

Religious life
- Religion: Islam
- Denomination: Sunni
- Movement: Tanzeem-e-Islami

Muslim leader
- Influenced by: Israr Ahmed

Akif Saeed (also known as Hafiz Akif Saeed) is a Pakistani scholar who was Ameer (leader) of Tanzeem-e-Islami party from 2002 to 2020.

== Biography ==
Akif Saeed was born in 1958 in Sahiwal, Punjab, Pakistan. His father Israr Ahmed was an Islamic scholar of Pakistan and founded the Tanzeem-e-Islami an Islamic organization in 1975, after developing differences with Jamaat-e-Islami Pakistan Amir (leader) Abul A'la Maududi and was the leader of the organization from 1975 to 2002. Akif Saeed then took over leadership of the organization and ran it from 2002 to August 2020.

In April 2009, Akif Saeed led a protest rally and voiced his concern against the US drone attacks inside the borders of Pakistan and killing of innocent people by the NATO forces.

In August 2020, Akif Saeed resigned from the organization leadership position due to health problems from heart ailments he had been suffering for the last few years, in addition he had tested positive a few months prior for COVID-19, noted scholar of the Quran, Shuja Uddin Sheikh, who had been with the organization for the last 22 years, was elected the new leader of the organization. The Shura of the organization (Central decision-making committee) accepted Akif Saeed's resignation and then elected the new leader.

== Literary works ==
- Allama Iqbal Ki Aakhri Khwahish (The Last wish of Muhammad Iqbal)

== See also ==
- Israr Ahmed
