= Muhammad Ali Mirza =

Pakistani Islamic cleric (born 1977)

- محمد علی مرزا
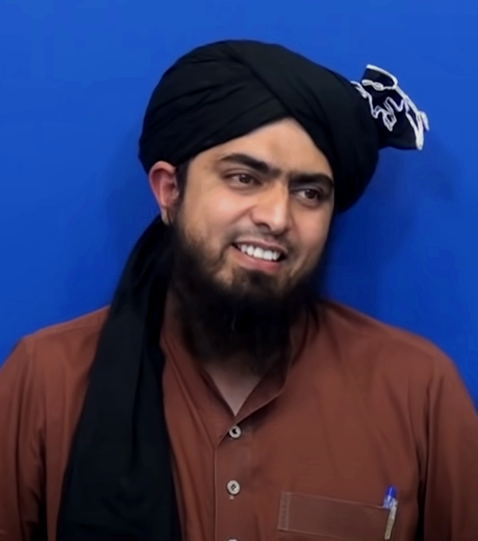

Personal life
- Born: 4 October 1977 (age 48) Jhelum, Punjab, Pakistan
- Education: University of Engineering and Technology, Taxila
- Occupation: Mechanical Engineer
- Website: www.ahlesunnatpak.com

Religious life
- Religion: Islam
- Denomination: Non-denominational

YouTube information
- Channel: Engineer Muhammad Ali Mirza - Official Channel
- Years active: 2014–present
- Genre: Islamic
- Subscribers: 3.19 million
- Views: 688 million
- Last updated: 8 March 2026

Muhammad Ali Mirza (Note: Urdu: محمد علی مرزا) (born 4 October 1977) is a Pakistani Islamic cleric. A mechanical engineer by profession, he is known for his lectures on religious topics like anti-sectarianism, which have attracted numerous controversies, including blasphemy charges, the first in 2023 and then in 2025.

== Early life and education ==
Muhammad Ali Mirza was born on 4 October 1977 in Jhelum, Punjab. His father, Mirza Arshad Mahmud, reportedly used to work in Allied Bank. Ali Mirza obtained his education in mechanical engineering from the University of Engineering and Technology, Taxila. He worked as a mechanical engineer for the Government of Punjab on the 19th pay scale but later quit when the department asked him to leave because he had become a public figure.

== Career ==
Mirza gives online lectures on religious issues via his YouTube channel and runs a research academy based on his understanding of the Quran and Sunnah. His critics claim that he uses derogatory terms for the Muslim saints.

In one video, Mirza considers the present-day Ahmadis to be better than Jews and Christians (the people of the book). He also said they are not Muslims and said that his video clips have been presented out of context.

=== 2020 arrest ===
He was arrested on 4 May 2020 on suspicion of hate speech directed at religious scholars. Pakistani actor Hamza Ali Abbasi and anchor Shafaat Ali posted on social media condemning his arrest. He was released on bail two days later. According to Ali, one of his lectures was presented completely out of context. He later said that if one starts presenting other opinions in such a way then even the verses of the Qur'an can be presented out of context.

=== 2025 arrest ===
On 25 August 2025, Mirza was detained by Jhelum police under Section 3 of the Punjab Maintenance of Public Order ordinance, which allows police to make arrests and detain suspects on "acting in any manner prejudicial to public safety” or to maintain public order. Authorities also locked his academy in Machine Mohalla, barring any gatherings or activities on the premises. He was charged under Pakistan's blasphemy law with outraging religious feelings, wounding religious sentiments, and making derogatory remarks against the companions or family of the Prophet Muhammad. Mirza was later transferred from District Jail Jhelum to District Jail Hafizabad as a precautionary measure. On 18 September 2025, he was transferred to Adiala Jail under high security, following his arrest in the blasphemy case and investigations by the NCCIA and FIA.

On 3 December 2025, the Lahore High Court (Rawalpindi Bench) granted Mirza bail, directing that he submit two surety bonds of Rs. 500,000 each in order for the bail to take effect.

== Assassination attempts ==
On 14 March 2021, Mirza survived a second assassination attempt, after surviving first attempt in October 2017. The attacker visited his academy in Jhelum, Pakistan at a weekly meeting and attempted to kill him with a knife while taking a picture with him. Ali escaped with minor arm injuries. Police arrested two suspects and registered an FIR against them. The attacker had traveled from Lahore to Jhelum to kill Mirza.

In August 2023, Ali Hasan, from Gujrat, attempted to barge into the Jhelum Academy armed with a knife. He was overpowered by guards and other members of the academy.

== Controversies ==
Mirza's views on Mu'awiya I, the first Umayyad Caliph have made him a controversial figure among the traditionalist Sunni Muslim scholars of Pakistan, such as Deobandi scholar Tariq Masood. In 2021 Mirza challenged Masood to arrive and have a face-to-face debate in Jhelum. The debate was planned for May 2021, and then postponed until October. However, the debate never took place. Masood claimed that he had travelled to Jhelum but was unable to make contact with Mirza; he and his supporters went on to declare victory over Muhammad Ali Mirza.

On 26 November 2023, Hanif Qureshi travelled to Jhelum for a planned munazra (face-to-face debate). Mirza then cancelled the debate and Qureshi was prevented from entering the Academy by Jhelum police; he then returned to Rawalpindi and proclaimed victory.

=== 2022 Muhammad remarks controversy ===
In June 2022, Ali Mirza criticized Taslim Rehmani for badmouthing Hindu gods in front of BJP spokesperson Nupur Sharma on Times Now. He said Nupur Sharma abused Muhammad in reaction to that. Indian journalist Rubika Liaquat praised Ali Mirza for his stand with Nupur Sharma on her Twitter account. Many Indian and Pakistani scholars were furious with Ali Mirza for this comment.

=== 2023 blasphemy charges ===
In April 2023, a case of blasphemy was registered against Ali Mirza under section 295C of the Pakistan Penal Code. The accusations against Mirza include insulting Islamic Prophet Muhammad and downplaying the Pakistani legal ruling that considers Ahmadis to have non-Muslim status. Pir Afzal Qadri, a deceased religious cleric, had offered a reward of Rs.500,000 for the assassination of Ali Mirza in 2023, stating that he deserved to be killed.
