= Muhammad Din Fauq =

Historian of Kashmir

Mujadid-e-Kashamara Muhammad Din Fauq محمد دین فوق Fouq
- Born: Muhammad Din Dar; Sialkot
- Died: Lahore, Punjab Province (British India), British Indian Empire, now Punjab, Pakistan
- Other name: Poet of Kashmir

Philosophical work
- Era: 20th-century poetry
- Region: British Indian Empire
- Main interests: Kashmiri poetry, History of Kashmir
- Notable works: Tareekh-e-Aqwaam-e-Kashmir, Tareekh-e-Aqwaam-e-Poonch, Tareekh-e-Aqwaam-e-Jammu, Mukammal Tareekh-e-Kashmir
- Notable ideas: Two-nation theory, Conception of Muslim Conference

Muhammad Din Fauq (or Muhammad Din Fouq) was a historian of Kashmir during the early 20th century. He was a pioneer of journalism in Jammu and Kashmir.

To espouse the cause of the Kashmiris as well as to extend solidarity, various organisations were formed before Partition of India. Prominent among them were the All India Muslim Kashmiri Conference and the All India Kashmir Committee. The former was established at Lahore in 1908 with Allama Iqbal and Muhammad Din Fauq as its prominent leaders.

Fauq wrote extensively on the Valley's history, folklore and geography. He published a history of Kashmir in 1910. In 1936, Fauq published an exhaustive survey on the origins and histories of Kashmir's well known families and communities. The survey has been described as being of considerable interest from the anthropological point of view.

Muhammad Din Fauq's work included detailed surveys of groups living in various areas throughout the Jammu and Kashmir region, in which he also recorded their traditions and history. Notable works of this project were titled Tarikh-e-Aqwam-e-Poonch (published in 1936), Tarikh-e-Aqwam-e-Kashmir (published in 1938), and Tarikh-e-Aqwam-e-Jammu. These works were written in the Urdu language.
