= Syed Zafarul Hasan =

Pakistani philosopher (1885–1949)

Allama Syed Zafarul Hasan
- سید ظفر الحسن
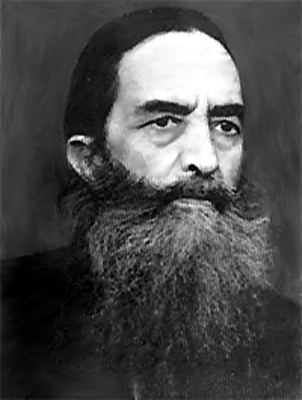
- Born: 14 February 1885
- Died: 19 June 1949 (aged 64); Lahore, Punjab, Pakistan
- Occupations: Philosopher; author

Education
- Education: Aligarh Muslim University; Oxford University

Philosophical work
- Era: Colonial India
- School: Islamic philosophy
- Language: Urdu; English
- Main interests: Islamic revival

Syed Zafarul Hasan (14 February 1885 – 19 June 1949) was a Pakistani Islamic philosopher.

== Biography ==
He was the eldest son of Khan Sahib Syed Diwan Mohammad.

Hasan was educated at Aligarh (M.A., LL. B.) and obtained doctorates from the universities of Erlangen and Heidelberg, Germany, and Oxford University. Dr Zafarul Hasan was the first Muslim scholar of the Indian sub-continent to earn a PhD from Oxford in Philosophy. His doctoral thesis Realism is a classic on the subject. Prominent philosophers and educationists lauded his work, among them, his teacher Prof. John Alexander Smith (1863–1930), and Allama Muhammad Iqbal.

He started teaching at the Aligarh Muslim University, Aligarh, India in 1911. In 1913, he became professor of philosophy at Islamia College, Peshawar. From 1924 to 1945 he was professor of philosophy at the Aligarh Muslim University, Aligarh – where he also served as Chairman of the Department of Philosophy and Dean of the Faculty of Arts. There, in 1939, he put forward the 'Aligarh Scheme' along with Dr Afzaal Hussain Qadri. They published a scheme ("The Problem of Indian Muslims") proposing three independent States.

From 1945 until the partition of the sub-continent, Dr Hasan was Emeritus Professor at Aligarh. In August 1947, he migrated to Lahore, Pakistan. He started work on a book that he could not complete due to his death in 1949. Only one volume ("PHILOSOPHY – A Critique") was ready, which was published from Lahore by Institute of Islamic Culture in 1988.

He received honours and served on a number of bodies: Member of Court, Member of Executive Council, Finance Co., Com. of Advanced Studies, Aligarh Muslim Univ.; Dir., Jamiat-ut-Tamaddunil-Islami, Bombay; Member, International Academy of Philosophy, Erlangen. Pres., Islami Jamaat, Aligarh. Member: Education Committee, All-India Muslim League; Kant Gesellscaft (Germany); Mind Assn. (England); Philosophical Congress (India); Academic Council of Muslim Univ. at Aligarh.

== Works ==
- Realism – An Attempt To Trace Its Origin And Development in Its Chief Representatives (Cambridge University Press, London, 1928)
- Realism (translated into Urdu), 1927
- Monismus Spinozas, 1922
- Descartes' Dualism, 1912
- Philosophy and Education, 1927
- Philosophy and Its Advantages, 1931
- Realism is not Metaphysics, 1931
- Islamics, 1936
- The Problem, 1933
- Revelation and Apostle, 1937
- Message of Iqbal, 1938
- Philosophy of Religion
- Philosophy of Islam
- Philosophy of Kant
- PHILOSOPHY – A Critique (Institute of Islamic Culture, Lahore, 1988)

== Sources ==
- World Biography, Fourth Edition of the Biographical Encyclopedia of the World, Institute for Research in Biography, New York, page 2183.

Philosophy – a Critique (by Syed Zafarul Hasan), Lahore, Pakistan: Institute of Islamic Culture, Lahore (Pakistan), 1988, OL 25240791M
