= Institute of Islamic Culture =

Institute of Islamic studies in Lahore, Pakistan

- Formation: 1950
- Founder: Khalifa Abdul Hakeem
- Founded at: Lahore, Pakistan
- Type: Non-governmental organization
- Purpose: Conducting scientific and research studies on various aspects of Islamic civilization and culture
- Headquarters: Lahore, Pakistan

The Institute of Islamic Culture is an independent non-governmental institute and publishing house of Islamic studies in Lahore, Pakistan. It was established in Lahore in 1950 for the purpose of conducting scientific and research studies on various aspects of Islamic civilization and culture. Dr. Khalifa Abdul Hakeem was its founder director.

== Directors ==
- Khalifa Abdul Hakim (1950 – 30 January 1959)
- M. M. Sharif (1959 - )
- S. M. Ikram (1 July 1966 – 17 January 1973)
- Muhammad Ishaq Bhatti
- S. A. Rahman

== Publications ==
- Quran Aur Ilm-e-Jadeed — An Urdu book by Dr. Muhammad Rafiuddin
- Islam Aur Mouseeqi — An Urdu book by Shah Muhammad Jafar Phulwarvi
