= Pakistan Association for the Advancement of Science =

Learned society established in 1947

- Abbreviation: PASS
- Formation: 12 December 1947; 78 years ago
- Purpose: Learned society
- Headquarters: Lahore, Pakistan
- Website: www.paas-pk.com

Pakistan Association for the Advancement of Science (PAAS) is a scientific organisation based in Pakistan. Headquartered in Lahore, the organisation was founded in December 1947 soon after the independence of Pakistan, and is among the oldest and premier science organisations in the country. Its aim is the promotion and development of science in the country, as well as to provide a forum for scientific meetings, and facilitate the publication of scientific research papers. Since 1949 the Pakistan Association for the advancement of science has published Pakistan Journal of Science (PJS).
