= Tolu-e-Islam =

Tolu-e-Islam may refer to:

- Tulu'i Islam a poem, written by Muhammad Iqbal.
- Tolu-e-Islam (magazine)
- Tolu-e-Islam (organization)
