= Syed Nazir Niazi =

Pakistani writer

Syed Nazeer Niazi
- Born: 1900
- Died: 1982 (aged 82)
- Known for: Muslim scholar, translator, and biographer of Sir Muhammad Iqbal
- Awards: Presidential Iqbal Award by the Government of Pakistan

Syed Nazeer Niazi (1900 – 1982) was an eminent Muslim scholar, professor and journalist. He was one of the leading activists of the Pakistan Movement.

Syed Nazeer is best known for his works on Iqbaliat, the study of the life and works of the philosopher and poet Muhammad Iqbal. His biography of Iqbal, Iqbal kay Hazoor, and collection of Iqbal's letters, Maktoobat-e-Iqbal Banaam Nasir Niazi, are still considered primary sources for the studies on Iqbal.

== Early education ==
Syed Nazeer received his early education from his uncle Shams-ul-ulema Syed Mir Hassan, a professor of Arabic and Persian languages. He further studied under Aslam Jairajpuri.

== Career ==
Syed Nazeer joined Jamia Millia Islamia in 1922 and served there till 1935. In 1927, he was appointed as head of Department of History of Islam. In 1946, he took responsibilities as head of Information and Communications of Punjab Muslim League, and worked for the Pakistan Movement. He was later awarded Pakistan Movement Gold Medal by the Government of Pakistan.

=== Translations ===
Syed Nazeer had the honour of being the first translator of Sir Muhammad Iqbal's 1930 Presidential Address to the 25th Session of the All-India Muslim League, Allahabad on 29 December 1930, in Urdu.

He is also known for his Urdu translation of The Reconstruction of Religious Thought in Islam by Sir Muhammad Iqbal. During the last two years of Iqbal's life, he regularly visited him and recorded his conversations in his book Iqbal kay Hazoor. He completed this conversation in three volumes, but unfortunately the last two volumes were destroyed, and only first volume was published.

=== Introduction to the History of Science ===
Syed Nazeer also translated George Sarton's Introduction to the History of Science in three-volume, a 4,236-pages work which reviews and catalogs the scientific and cultural contributions of every civilisation from antiquity through the fourteenth century. According to Will Durant, "Every writer on Islamic science must record his debt to George Sarton for his Introduction to the History of Science." This Urdu translation was published by Majlis Tariqi Adab in three volumes.

=== Journalism ===
In 1935, according to the instructions of Sir Muhammad Iqbal, he initiated and edited the journal Tolu-e-Islam named after the well-known poem of Sir Muhammad Iqbal, Tulu'i Islam. Syed Nazeer dedicated the first edition of this journal to Sir Muhammad Iqbal. His first article in the journal was "Millat Islamia Hind" (lit. The Muslim Nation of India). This journal played an important part in the Pakistan Movement. His articles on Islamic concept of state in Muslim League journal Manshoor published in Delhi in 1945 are considered an important historical material on the subject.

Afterwards, the journal editor was Ghulam Ahmed Pervez, who also contributed many articles in the early editions of the journal. Ghulam Ahmad also named his movement as Tolu-e-Islam (Resurgence of Islam). This journal is still published by Idara Tolu-e-Islam. Initially, "Its primary object was to tell the people of British India that according to the Quran, ideology and not geographical boundary, was the basis for the formation of nation, and that a politically independent state was pre-requisite to live in Islam."

After the establishment of Pakistan, the chief objective of Tolu-e-Islam was to propagate the implementation of the principles which had inspired the demand for a separate Muslim state; that is, to help transform the live force of Islam into the Constitution of Pakistan.

== Awards and recognition ==
- Presidential Iqbal Award by the Government of Pakistan.

== See also ==
- Ghulam Ahmed Pervez
- Maulana Aslam Jairajpuri
- Tulu'i Islam
- Tolu-e-Islam
- Jamia Millia Islamia
- George Sarton
- All-India Muslim League
- Pakistan movement

== Bibliography ==
1. Iqbal kay Hazoor (in Urdu) by Syed Nazeer Niazi
2. Maktoobat-e-Iqbal Benam Nazeer Niazi (in Urdu) by Syed Nazeer Niazi
3. Zinda Rud, 3 Volumes, by Justice Javed Iqbal
