= Jairaj =

Jairaj may refer to:

- Paidi Jairaj, Indian film actor, director and producer
- Jairaj Phatak, 25th municipal commissioner of the Brihanmumbai Municipal Corporation (BMC), India

== See also ==
- Jayaraj, Indian filmmaker
- Jayaraj (name), an Indian name
- Jairajpur, a village in Azamgarh District, Uttar Pradesh, India
