= Non-denominational Muslim =

Muslim not readily classified in terms of Islamic school or branch

A non-denominational Muslim is a Muslim who does not belong to, does not self-identify with, or cannot be readily classified under one of the identifiable Islamic schools and branches. Such Muslims do not think of themselves as belonging to a denomination but rather as "just Muslims" or "non-denominational Muslims." Muslims who do not adhere to a sect are also known as non-sectarian Muslims.

While the majority of the population in the Middle East identify as either Sunni or Shi'a, a significant number of Muslims identify as non-denominational. According to a 2012 study by the Pew Research Center, Muslims who do not identify with a sect and identify as "just a Muslim" make up a majority of the Muslims in these countries: Kazakhstan (74%), Albania (65%), Kyrgyzstan (64%), Kosovo (58%), Indonesia (56%), Mali (55%), Bosnia and Herzegovina (54%), Uzbekistan (54%), and a plurality in four countries: Azerbaijan (45%), Russia (45%), Nigeria (42%), and Cameroon (40%). They are found primarily in Central Asia. Southeastern Europe also has a large number of Muslims who do not identify with a sect. Identification as "just a Muslim" is less prevalent in North Africa (median of 12%) and South Asia (median of 4%). In Lithuania, non-denominational Muslims fall into the category of "non-traditional religious communities", and are formally separated by law from Sunnis.

Sectarian controversies have a long and complex history in Islam and they have been exploited and amplified by rulers for political ends. However, the notion of Muslim unity has remained an important ideal and in modern times intellectuals have spoken against sectarian divisions. Surveys have reported that large proportions of Muslims in some parts of the world self-identify as "just Muslim" or "Muslim only", although there is little published analysis available regarding the motivations underlying this response.

== Etymology ==
=== Non-sectarian Muslims ===
Muslims who do not adhere to a sect are also known as non-sectarian Muslims.

=== Non-madhhabi ===
The description non-madhhabi may be used for example in relation to Islamic studies at educational institutions that are not limited in scope to one particular madhhab or school of jurisprudence. For non-denominational Muslims, Pew uses the description of "choose not to affiliate" while Russian officials use the term "Unaffiliated Muslims" for those who do not belong to any branch or denomination. Unlike Sunnis, Shias, and Ibadis, non-denominational Muslims are not affiliated with any school of thought (madhhab).

=== Ghayr Muqallid ===
The term ghair-muqallid, i.e. "non-blind-follower", can be used to describe the adherents of movements such as Salafism and Ahl-e-Hadith, who do not necessarily follow the rulings of a particular traditional madhhab but identify as Sunni Muslims.

== Beliefs ==
Non-sectarian Muslims often cite Qur'anic verses to support their stance, including Surah al-Imran: Verse 103: "And hold firmly to the rope of Allah all together and do not become divided. And remember the favor of Allah upon you - when you were enemies and He brought your hearts together and you became, by His favor, brothers. And you were on the edge of a pit of the Fire, and He saved you from it." Critics of non-denominational Muslims argue that they misinterpret the Qur'anic injunction against division, neglect the broader Islamic teachings and hadiths, and disregard Islamic jurisprudence (fiqh).

Unlike Sunnis, Shias, Ibadis, and Ahmadis, non-denominational Muslims are not affiliated with any school of thought. Some Muslims who oppose sectarian divisions also reject hadith, believing that hadith contribute to sectarianism.

== History of Islamic sectarianism ==
Muslim self-identification; non-denominational Muslims are shown in light blue

After the death of the Islamic prophet Muhammad, two conflicting views emerged about who should succeed him as the leader of the Muslim community. Some Muslims, who believed that Muhammad never clearly named his successor, resorted to the Arabian tradition of electing their leader by a council of influential members of the community. Others believed that Muhammad had chosen his cousin and son-in-law Ali ibn Abi Talib to succeed him. This disagreement eventually resulted in a civil war which pitted supporters of Ali against supporters of the founder of the Umayyad dynasty Mu'awiyah ibn Abi Sufyan, and these two camps later evolved into the Sunni and Shia denominations. For the Shias, Ali and the Imams who succeeded him gradually became the embodiment of God's continuing guidance, and they tended to stress the religious functions of the caliphate and deplore its political compromises; Sunnis were more inclined to circumscribe its religious role and more readily accepted its pragmatic dimensions. As these differences became increasingly vested with religious importance, they gave rise to two distinct forms of Islam.

One assumption is that Sunnis represent Islam as it existed before the divisions, and should be considered as normative, or the standard. This perception is partly due to the reliance on highly ideological sources that have been accepted as reliable historical works, and also because the vast majority of the population is Sunni. Centuries of competition between Sunnis and Shias have led to ideological struggles. Both sects used each other to further cement their own identities and divisions.

During the Umayyad period, many non-Arab converts (mawali) and their sects and schools tended to be willing to join anti-Umayyad causes. Both Sunni and Shia scholars have held anti-Umayyad views, most notably concerning Yazid ibn Mu'awiyah.

In the early modern period, the conflict between Shias and Sunnis took a turn for the worse when the Safavid and Ottoman dynasties turned the military conflict between them into a religious war after the Safavids made Shia Islam the state religion in their empire. During that era some Sunnis and Shias for the first time began refusing to recognize each other as Muslims. Sectarianism continued to be exploited for political benefits into modern times. An example of this was the Zia regime in Pakistan, who used sectarian divisions between the Sunni and Shia to counter the growing geopolitical influence of Iran, as well as to distract from the domestic political problems. Post-Zia governments in Pakistan continued to "cynically manipulate sectarian conflicts for short term political gain."

== Development and thought ==
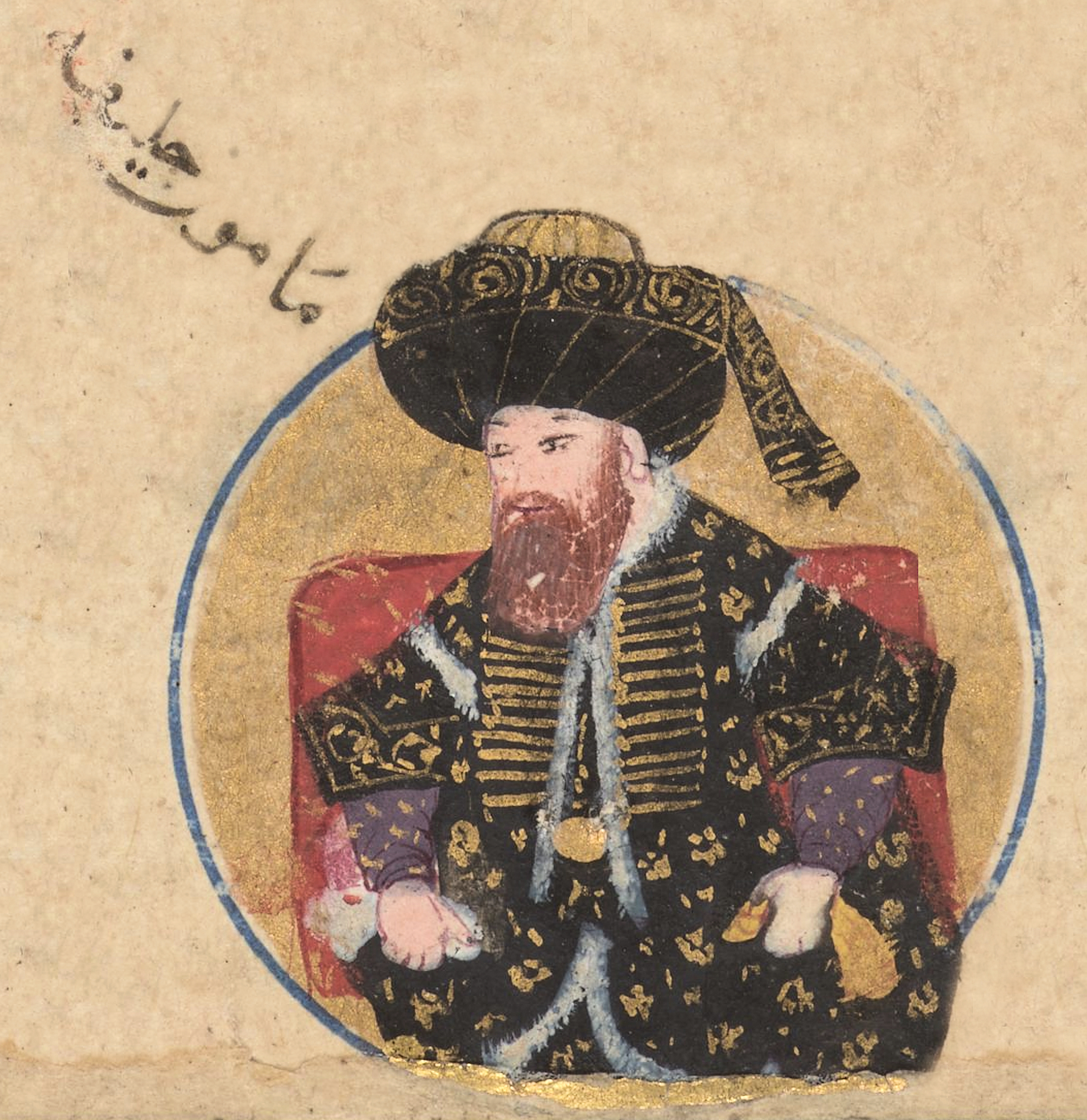
Abbasid caliph Al-Ma'mun, known for his attempts to end sectarian rivalry in Islam

Non-denominational Muslims defend their stance by pointing to the Qur'an such as Surah al-Imran: Verse 103, which asks Muslims to stay united and not to become divided.

The seventh Abbasid caliph al-Ma'mun (r. 813–833) was known for his attempts to end sectarian rivalry in Islam and to impose upon his subjects a rationalist Muslim creed.

Many scholars hold the Brethren of Purity to be "free-thinkers" who transcended sectarian divisions. Besides founding their views on the Qur'an, the Ikhwan also appealed in their Epistles to the Torah (Tawrat) and the Gospel (Injeel). While it is generally accepted that their literature belonged to a Shi'ite legacy that had strong connections with the Isma'ili tradition, the Ikhwan were also inspired by the works of Pythagoras, Socrates, Plato, Aristotle, Plotinus, Euclid, Ptolemy, Porphyry, and Iamblichus. Their syncretism, as a result, overcame the sectarian discords of their time.

Talking about sectarianism, Persian Muslim poet Hafiz (d. 1389–1390) said, "Forgive the war of the 72 sects; since they did not see the truth they have struck out on the road to fancy". Hafiz regarded sectarian quarrels as afsana (a tale) that preoccupies those who fail to understand the diversity of faith. The poems of Hafiz were known for their non-sectarian tone, and were even quoted by Debendranath Tagore.

The third Mughal emperor Akbar (r. 1556–1605), who was from a Sunni family and was tutored by two Shia scholars from Iran, was aware of the dangers of Muslim sectarian dissension, and did not tolerate sectarian disputes disrupting the public order. In 1578, Akbar forced all major ulama to sign a mahzar, in this case a declaration that he alone was the caliph and that, consequently, his opinion in religious matters prevailed.

Condemning the historically prevailing trend of blindly imitating religious leaders, the pan-Islamist revolutionary Jamal al-Din al-Afghani refused to identify himself with a specific sect or imam by insisting that he was just a Muslim and a scholar. A proponent of Muslim unity, he criticised Sunni and Shia extremists as well as the ideology of nationalism, insisting that Islam was doctrinally the only nationality for all Muslims and historically the only bond that effectively tied them all together.

Believing in the unification of Muslims in order to go back to the "true Islam", Egyptian scholar Muhammad Abduh (d. 1905) held that the extreme fervour of sects was responsible for the divide of Muslims, and this division, alongside unsubstantiated religious practises and false religious doctrine such as the exaggerations of the Sufi order, was one of the reasons for their decline.

Islam originally brought a radical egalitarianism to a fiercely tribal society, within which a person's status was based on his tribal membership. The Quran set all believing individuals as equals, erasing the importance of tribal status. The primary identity of "Muslims" became simply "Muslim", rather than as a member of a tribe, ethnicity or gender. The Quranic concept of the ummah depends on this unified concept of an Islamic community, and it was appealed to again in the 19th century, as a response to colonialism by European powers. One Muslim scholar leading the emphasis on Muslim unity was Muhammad Iqbal, whose views have been referred to as "ummatic". Iqbal emphatically referred to sectarianism as an "idol" that needed to be "smashed forever". He is quoted as having stated, "I condemn this accursed religious and social sectarianism, there are no Wahhabis, Shias or Sunnis. Fight not for interpretations of the truth when the truth itself is in danger." In his later life, Iqbal began to transcend the narrow domain of nationalist causes and began to speak to the Muslims spread all over the globe, encouraging them to unify as one community.

Iqbal's influence on Muhammad Ali Jinnah, the founder of Pakistan, is also well documented. Jinnah was born to an Ismaili Shia family and briefly converted to Sunni Islam as a young man. Jinnah publicly described himself as neither Shia nor Sunni, and his standard answer to questions asking him to define his sect being: "was the Prophet Muhammad a Shia or a Sunni?"

Other intellectuals who spoke against sectarianism during this era were Altaf Hussain Hali, who blamed sectarianism for the decline of Muslims, the Aga Khan III, who cited it as a hindrance to progress, and Muhammad Akram Khan, who said sectarianism drained the intellectual capacities of Muslim scholars.

An anti-sectarian culture and anti-sectarian nationalist movements and parties emerged in Syria after 1860, especially around the Arab movement and the Arab government under King Faisal I of Iraq (r. 1921–1933). Faisal, who abhorred sectarianism, was an advocate of a mild and inclusive form of Arab nationalism, around which a consensus could be built, and as a shared platform that could span the differences between the sects. Due to his anti-sectarian stance, Faisal had a displeasing relationship with Sati' al-Husri.

Malaysian Muslim scholar Kassim Ahmad argued that some hadith promote ideas that conflict with science and create sectarian issues, stating the hadith are "sectarian, anti-science, anti-reason and anti-women".

In 1947, the non-sectarian movement Jama'ah al-Taqrib bayna al-Madhahib al-Islamiyyah was founded in Cairo, Egypt. Several of its supporters were high-ranking scholars of Al-Ahzar University. The movement sought to bridge the gap between Sunnis and Shi'is. At the end of the 1950s, the movement reached a wider public, as the Egyptian president Gamal Abdel Nasser discovered the usefulness of pan-Islamism for his foreign policy.

During his reign, Sheikh Zayed bin Sultan Al Nahyan of the Emirates urged solidarity and co-operation between nations, Arab and non-Arab. The ideal policy in his view was openness and a combination of modernisation and preservation of traditional values and distinct identity. He also called for protecting Islam against sectarianism and factionalism. Similarly, his son Mohamed bin Zayed Al Nahyan (r. 2022–present) has advocated against sectarian conflicts amongst Arabs and Muslims.

During his reign, King Abdullah of Saudi Arabia (r. 2005–2015) acted to reduce regional sectarianism. Abdullah's promotion of sectarian harmony was faced by many challenges, including the king not having the support of all members of the royal family.

According to Thomas West and Sonia Alianak, Jordan and Morocco withstood the tidal wave of revolutions during the Arab Spring of 2011 because King Abdullah II of Jordan and King Muhammad VI of Morocco, both descendants of Muhammad and non-sectarian, resorted to reform instead of being toppled by making use of their religious credentials and pedigrees.

In Pakistan, sectarianism is cited as a hindrance to the unification of Islamic Law: "Codification of the Islamic Laws related to family and property on the basis of the concept of Talfiq should also be considered. This will require strong public opinion in favour of this unification of the Islamic Law on a non-sectarian basis, as no change can be considered permanent unless it has full support of the public."

In Lithuania, non-denominational Muslims fall into the category of "non-traditional religious communities", and are formally separated by law from Sunnis.

== Academia ==
There are faith schools and graduation programs with curriculums that have been described as being oriented towards non-denominational Islam. Non-denominational Muslims have been adopted by some theocratic governments into their fold of pan-Islamism as a means to tackle unreasoning partisanship and takfirism. Some academic press publishing companies have assigned a proper noun-like title to Muslims without a specific sectarian affiliation by capitalizing the designation as Just a Muslim. The customs and rituals practised by non-denominational Muslims in Northern Nigeria are statistically more likely to be Sunni-inclined. In other jurisdictions, some officials have applied a mandatory religious instruction that purportedly gives students a non-denominational outlook in an attempt to appear pluralistic, but in practice, does no such thing.

=== Dispersions ===
Western-born Muslims are more likely to be non-affiliated than immigrant Muslims, and when pressed may suggest they try to follow Islamic religious texts "as closely as possible". Although Pew has given comprehensive figures on Muslims with an unspecified branch or affiliation, earlier research from 2006 has also come from CAIR. Some publishers and authors have categorized such non-specified Muslims as being within the liberal or progressive stream of the faith. Sahelian non-denominational Muslims have demonstrated an aversion to austere religious measures. However, non-denominational Muslims in a locality in India have expressly suggested that non-denominational Islam is more traditional than what they consider as the more puritan and reformist Deobandi movement.

Although some non-denominational Muslims came to their position influenced by their parents, others have come to this position irrespective and in spite of their parents. Some laymen non-denominational Muslims exhibit hostility towards the notion that Islam is divided into the binary subdivisions of Sunnism and Shi'ism, thereby erasing space for the unaffiliated non-denominational Muslims.

Non-denominational Islam has been described as a generic or a broad run-of-the-mill approach to the faith. Some adherents to the non-denominational form of Islam perceive it as less judgemental or censorious. Some non-denominational Muslims consider their unaffiliated stance to be a shield against the risk of becoming docile and meek subjects of domineering clergymen. According to the Muslim Council of America, facets occurring among non-denominational Muslims from a practical point of view includes lacking organizational convenance or spokespersons, and in terms of precepts, a universal or inclusive approach to all schools of thought. According to MCA, non-denominational Muslims also deemphasize the opinion of scholars, viewing them as non-binding, reject the blasphemy or riddah laws within Islam, and posit the implementation of human dignity, freedom of expression and human intellect according to circumstance and changing situations, such as discernment between the present and seventh century Arabia. They have also depicted non-denominational Muslims as having a theological position that favors self-determination, human intellect, human dignity, a proportionate level of egalitarianism between the various religions and genders, and adapting to changing circumstances. Despite on occasion sourcing indicating that those identifying as just a Muslim may constitute up to a quarter of Muslims, more established institutions may express hostility to such a flexible approach to faith due to its ability to foment attitudes calling for an elimination of Islamic clergy.

=== Setting ===
In 2017, there were 144 non-denominational prayer rooms and other places of worship in the United Kingdom, open to all denominations. This represented 7.4% of the total of mosques and Islamic prayer rooms in the UK. 99% of them provided women's facilities such as prayer space, toilets or ablution spaces. In 2013, there were 156 non-denominational Muslim prayer rooms and places of worship in the U.K, although according to Mehmood Naqshbandi, the congregation does not necessarily subscribe to the same viewpoints as the staff. This represented 3.5 per cent of the total mosque capacity and 9.4% of the total number of mosques and Islamic prayer rooms in the UK. Those who are non-denominational Muslim have seen the term adopted or adherents coalescing with a wide assortment of persuasions, including Muslim revivalists (known as mujaddids), Salafists, active members of the Muslim Brotherhood, those who criticise the traditional Muslim view on homosexuality, or the quintessential all-embracing Ansar-ud-Din college, described as a "non-denominational Muslim institution" in Ota Ogun State, Nigeria wherein in the 1950s, all its Islam-related shelves were stocked with books solely affiliated with Ahmadiyya or from western orientalists, even though Ahmadiyya is considered heretical in countries such as India, Pakistan, and Indonesia.

== Polls ==
According to a 2012 Pew study, Muslims who do not identify with a sect and identify as "just a Muslim" make up a majority of the Muslims in eight countries: Kazakhstan (74%), Albania (65%), Kyrgyzstan (64%), Kosovo (58%), Indonesia (56%), Mali (55%), Bosnia and Herzegovina (54%), Uzbekistan (54%), and a plurality in four countries: Azerbaijan (45%), Russia (45%), Nigeria (42%), and Cameroon (40%). They are found primarily in Central Asia. Kazakhstan has the largest proportion of Muslims who do not identify with a sect, who constitute about 74% of the Muslim population. According to WorldAtlas, 30% of Moroccans are non-denominational Muslims. While the majority of the population in the Middle East identify as either Sunni or Shi'a, a significant number of Muslims identify as non-denominational. Southeastern Europe also has a large number of Muslims who do not identify with a sect.

== Commentary ==
It has been described as a phenomenon that gained momentum in the 20th century which can overlap with orthodox Sunni tenets despite adherents not adhering to any specific madhhab. In an alluding commentary on surah Al-Muʼminun verse 53 of the Qur'an, Abdullah Yusuf Ali states:

The people who began to trade on the names of the prophets cut off that unity and made sects; and each sect rejoices in its own narrow doctrine, instead of taking the universal teaching of unity from Allah. But this sectarian confusion is of man's making. It will last for a time, but the rays of truth and unity will finally dissipate it. Worldly wealth, power and influence may be but trials. Let not their possessors think that they are in themselves things that will necessarily bring them happiness.

== Organizations ==
- Brethren of Purity, a secret Arab confraternity, founded at Basra, Iraq, that produced a philosophical and religious encyclopaedia, Encyclopedia of the Brethren of Purity, sometime in the second half of the 10th century AD. Many scholars hold the Ikhwan to be "free-thinkers" who transcended sectarian divisions and were not bound by the doctrines of any specific creed.
- Jama'ah al-Taqrib bayna al-Madhahib al-Islamiyyah, a non-sectarian movement founded in Cairo, Egypt in 1947. At the end of the 1950s, the movement reached a wider public, as the Egyptian president Gamal Abdel Nasser discovered the usefulness of pan-Islamism for his foreign policy.
- Tolu-e-Islam; inspired by the principles of Muhammad Iqbal's philosophy, led by Ghulam Ahmed Pervez, Tolu-e-Islam is an organization based in Pakistan. It does not affiliate with any political party or religious sect.
- The Open Mosque was founded by Dr. Taj Hargey in Cape Town, South Africa. It is led by Hargey's "non-sectarian" approach to Islam, which includes rejecting hadith.
- The People's Mosque, an online nondenominational Muslim movement that seeks to distinguish itself by contrasting its own principles with ultra-conservative political Muslims.
- Cambridge Central Mosque is a non-denominational place of worship.
- Ansar-ud-Din college, a college in Ogun state, Nigeria.

== Notable individuals ==
Notable Muslim figures who have espoused an anti-sectarian stance include:

- Al-Ma'mun
- Hafiz
- Akbar
- Altaf Hussain Hali
- Jamal al-Din al-Afghani
- Kassim Ahmad
- Muhammad Abduh
- Muhammad Akram Khan
- Muhammad Ali Jinnah
- Muhammad Iqbal
- Aga Khan III
- Faisal I of Iraq
- Ghulam Ahmed Pervez
- Zayed bin Sultan Al Nahyan
- Abdullah of Saudi Arabia
- Imran Nazar Hosein
- Mohamed bin Zayed Al Nahyan
- Abdullah II of Jordan
- Muhammad VI of Morocco

== See also ==
- Non-denominational

Other religions:

- Non-denominational Judaism
- Non-denominational Christianity
- Ecumenism
- Unitarian Universalism
