= Tolu-e-Islam (magazine) =

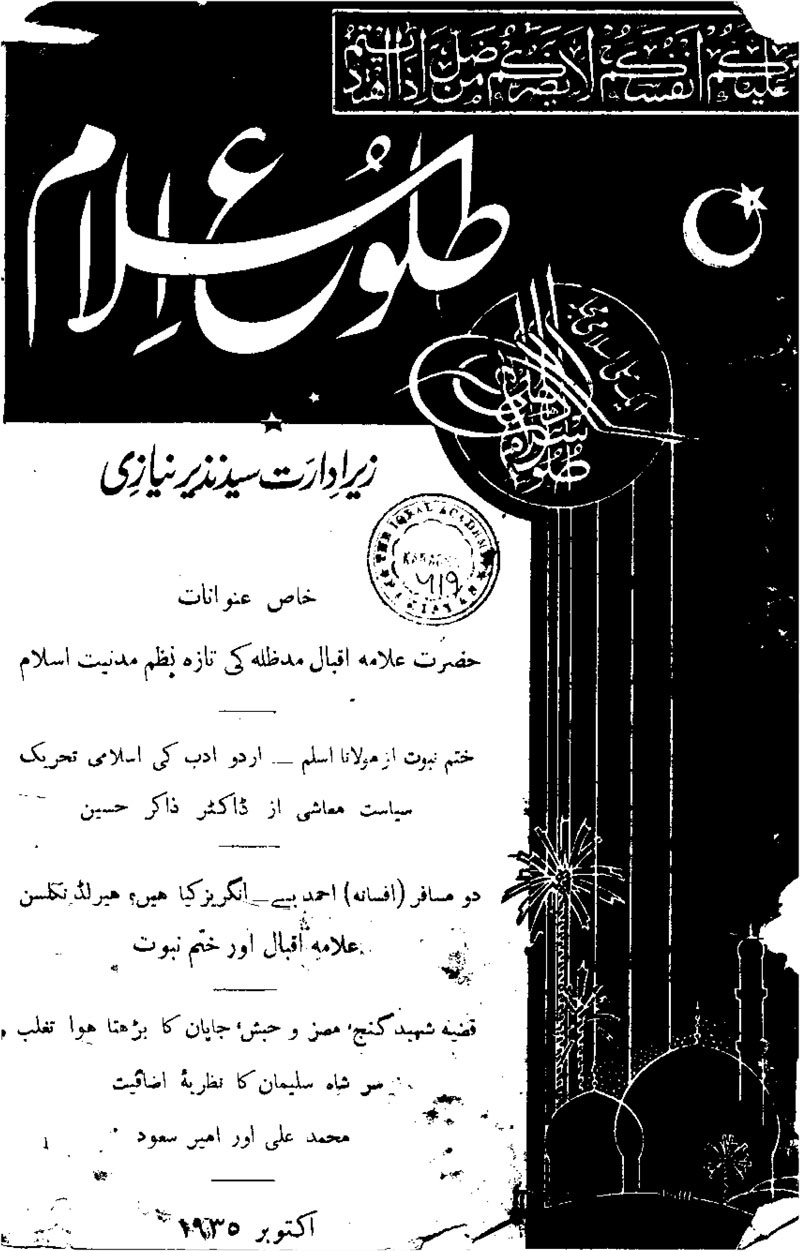
First issue of Tolu-e-Islam

Tolu-e-Islam is a historical, political, religious, cultural magazine of Muslims of British India and Pakistan. In 1935, according to the instructions of Sir Muhammad Iqbal, Syed Nazeer Niazi initiated and edited a journal named after "Tulu'i Islam", a poem by Iqbal. Niazi also dedicated the first edition of this journal to Iqbal. For a long time Iqbal had wanted a journal to propagate his ideas and the aims and objective of the All-India Muslim League.

== Origins ==
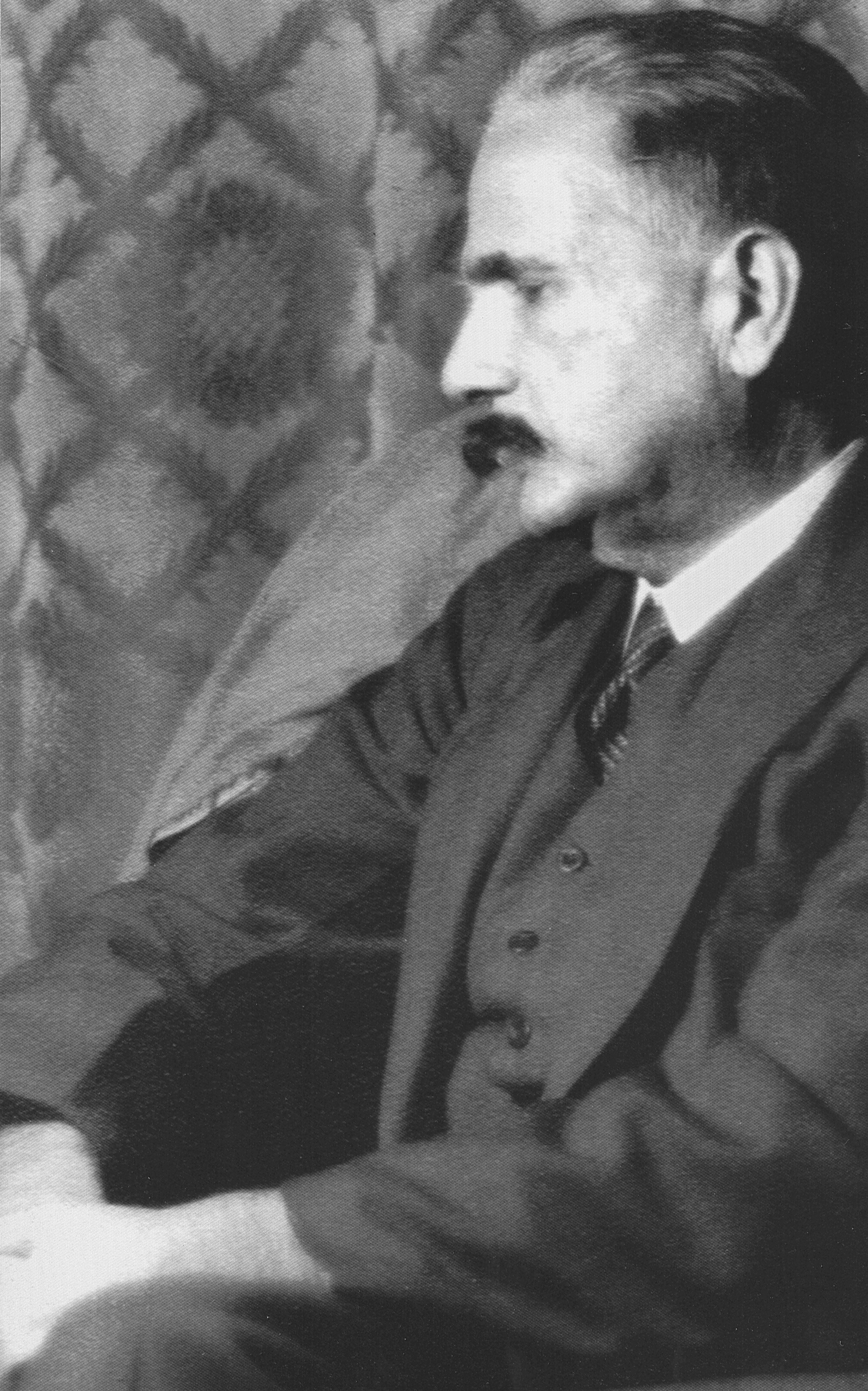
Sir Muhammad Iqbal

Iqbal was interested in the renaissance of Islam in the world and especially in British India. He was a strong proponent of the political revival of Islam in British India. He delivered his famous lectures published as The Reconstruction of Religious Thought in Islam. "He was also one of the most prominent leaders of the All-India Muslim League, Iqbal encouraged the creation of a "state in northwestern India for Muslims" in his 1930 presidential address. Iqbal encouraged and worked closely with Muhammad Ali Jinnah, and he is known as Muffakir-e-Pakistan ("The Thinker of Pakistan"), Shair-e-Mashriq ("The Poet of the East"), and Hakeem-ul-Ummat ("The Sage of Ummah")."

He wanted to initiate a journal but due to his busy political and literary life, he could not launch one for a long time. In 1935, three years before his death, he asked his friends and followers to initiate a journal and also suggested the name of the journal himself.

Eminent Muslim scholars, including Maulana Aslam Jairajpuri, Ghulam Ahmad Parwez, and Raja Hassan Akhtar were early contributors.

== 1936 Kitab Khana Tolu-e-Islam ==
In the edition of September 1936, Niazi announced the creation of "Kitab Khana Tolu-e-Islam" ( Tolu-e-Islam Publishing House). For this publishing house Sir Muhammad Iqbal, gave his book "Zerb Kaleem". This publication house published many books on Islam and the Pakistan Movement. The publisher and the journal played an important part in the Pakistan Movement.

== 1938 Ghulam Ahmad Parwez ==
Afterward, this journal was continued by Ghulam Ahmed Pervez, who had already contributed many articles in the early editions of this journal. He also named his movement as Tolu-e-Islam ("Resurgence of Islam"). Parwez took the fundamental ideas of Iqbal and elaborated as well as expanded them (see Ideas of Ghulam Ahmed Pervez). The journal is still published by Idara Tolu-e-Islam, Lahore. Initially, its goal was to tell the people of British India that according to the Quran, ideology and not geographical boundary, was the basis for the formation of nation, and that a politically independent state was pre-requisite to live in Islam.

== After the emergence of Pakistan ==
After the emergence of Pakistan, the chief objective before Tolu-e-Islam was to interpret Quran through Tasreef-ul-Ayat; a methodology that involves understanding the Quranic words used at one part in Quran through same root words used in other parts of the Quran; and to transform the basis of the society through implementation of the principle which had inspired the demand for separate Muslim State that is, to infuse Islamic Ideology into the Constitution of Pakistan.

== See also ==
- Jamia Millia Islamia
- Pakistan movement
