= Ahmad Salahuddin =

Indian scientist

- Born: 7 July 1937; Azamgarh district, Uttar Pradesh, India
- Died: 26 November 1996 (aged 59); Aligarh, Uttar Pradesh, India
- Education: PhD in Chemistry, AMU Aligarh; PhD in biochemistry, Duke University
- Alma mater: AMU Aligarh
- Known for: Hydrophobic effect on native and functional protein
- Awards: Fulbright Fellowship, Council of Scientific and Industrial Research Fellowship
- Scientific career
- Fields: Biochemistry, protein folding
- Institutions: AMU Aligarh, University of Maryland School of Medicine

Ahmad Salahuddin (7 July 1937 – 26 November 1996) was an Indian biochemist who served as a professor of biochemistry and department chairman (1984–1996) at Aligarh Muslim University (AMU) Aligarh, India. He was a Founder Director of Interdisciplinary Biotechnology Unit at AMU in 1984.

== Early life ==
Salahuddin was born on 7 July 1937 in Jairajpur, Azamgarh, Uttar Pradesh. His father, Fazlul Bari, was a teacher at the Shibli National College, Azamgarh where he received his early education, and he later completed his undergraduate and master's degrees in 1955 and 1957 in chemistry from the Aligarh Muslim University. Initially as a research student, he took interest in physical chemistry, obtaining his PhD degree in chemistry from Aligarh Muslim University Aligarh (1962).

== Career ==
Salahuddin received his second Ph.D. degree at Duke University, where he worked on his Ph.D. dissertation (1964 to 1968). In the laboratory of Charles Tanford, Department of Biochemistry, Duke University, he focussed on the process of protein folding in denaturants with native and the unfolded protein characterizations. His early collaborative work in uncovering residual native protein structure, following treatment with heat, acid (low pH) experimentally in a number of model proteins in his lab was published, 1967. He actually performed equilibrium unfolding studies on ribonuclease protein in guanidine hydrochloride, the results of which constituted his Ph.D. dissertation required for a Ph.D. degree in biochemistry, Duke University (1968), together with a publication (1970).

Salahuddin returned to AMU Aligarh and joined the Department of Biochemistry, Faculty of Medicine, J.N. Medical College as a reader, 1968. Salahuddin was present at the foundation ceremony of the new IBU Building on 15 January 1986. The event was inaugurated by Abdus Salam. He performed a critical role toward the establishment of the Interdisciplinary Biotechnology Institute for Modern Biological and Biotechnological Education at Aligarh along with the AMU administration in 1984.

== Research ==
Egg white ovalbumin: The unfolding of ovalbumin, a 45 kDa protein, as a function of guanidine hydrochloride (0-6M) occurred reversibly in one step. The protein fractions in native (N) and the denatured states (D) were characterized by UV spectrometry and viscosity measurements at defined temperatures in buffer pH 7.0. The thermodynamics of folding and possibly kinetics followed a two state transition (N->D). The data were consistent with the fact that the native state was stabilized by hydrophobic effect in aqueous solution; this effect was diminished by introducing Guanidine hydrochloride to protein solution with concomitant transition to denatured state, random coil conformation similar to a nascent polypeptide chain.

Egg white Ovomucoid: The unfolding of ovomucoid (N), a domain containing 28 kDa protein, by guanidine hydrochloride did not proceed in a single step but occurred in two steps; the transition at low denaturant was associated with an intermediate, native-like, structure (X), and at high denaturant, protein existed in random coil structure (D). The reversible unfolding at each step (N->X->D) followed a two state transition pattern, albeit with somewhat different folding rates for the intermediate and native structures (1978). The studies in his lab indicated that in vivo protein folding may not be explained by the amino acid sequence of an individual protein alone. Independently, the molecular biology of chaperones succeeded in the identification of additional folding factors in 1989. The latter studies marked the beginning of modern protein folding with manipulation in human health.

== Awards and honours ==
Salahuddin was President of Society of Biological Chemists SBC (India) from 1989 to 1990; a Member of the editorial board of Indian Journal of Biochemistry and Biophysics(1985–1988); Visiting Associate Professor, University of Maryland 1975; Member of Protein Society, Bethesda, USA(1995–1997); Member of the New York Academy of Science, New York(1995–1996); Member of the executive committee of the Society of Biological Chemists, India(1974–1975); Member of the executive committee of Indian Biophysical Society, India (1991–1993); Member of the Guha Research Conference, India (1987–1992); and Member of Sigma Xi (USA).

== Death ==
Salahuddin died on 29 November 1996 at the age of 59 after a difficult illness. Eulogies by his former students were read at the annual meeting of the Aligarh Alumni Association Washington DC; by others at a session at AMU Aligarh on 3 Jan 2019. At his death he was survived by his wife and two daughters.

== Selected publications ==
- Saeed T, Salahuddin A (1993). "Preparation and characterization of fragments from the N-terminal end of bovine serum albumin under native conditions". Biochem. J. 296 (Pt 2): 347–350. doi:10.1042/bj2960347. PMC 1137701. PMID 8257423.
- M.Y. Khan and A. Salahuddin (1984). "Lack of N→F transition in the N-terminal fragment (domain I and II) of bovine serum albumin". European Journal of Biochemistry. 141 (3): 473–5. doi:10.1111/j.1432-1033.1984.tb08216.x. PMID 6745254. S2CID 6451000.
- Ansari AA, Salahuddin A. (1973). "Effects of pH, ionic strength and temperature on the ovalbumin anti-ovalbumin precipitin reaction". Immunology. 25 (3): 377–83. PMC 1423065. PMID 4742047.
- Abdul Waheed; M. Abul Qasim; A. Salahuddin (1977). "Characterization of Stable Conformational States in Urea-Induced Transition in Ovomucoid". FEBS Journal. 76 (2): 383–390. doi:10.1111/j.1432-1033.1977.tb11606.x. PMID 891522. S2CID 38204058.
- Pasha, S. T.; Salahuddin, A. (1977). "Isolation of buffalo muscle aldolase and comparison of its properties with those of rabbit muscle aldolase". Biochimica et Biophysica Acta (BBA) - Enzymology. 483 (2): 435–442. doi:10.1016/0005-2744(77)90071-7. PMID 19072.
- Salahuddin, A.; Siddiqui, F. A.; Salahuddin, P. (1996). "Isolation, purification and properties of cathepsin B from buffalo liver". Indian Journal of Biochemistry & Biophysics. 33 (4): 292–297. PMID 8936819.
- A. Waseem and A. Salahuddin (1983). "Anomalous temperature dependence of the specific interaction of Concanavalin A with multivalent ligand-Dextrin". Biochimica et Biophysica Acta (BBA) - Protein Structure and Molecular Enzymology. 746 (1–2): 65–71. doi:10.1016/0167-4838(83)90011-0. PMID 19455757.
- Ali Najma and Salahuddin A (1989). "Isolation and characterization of soluble beta galactoside-binding lectins from mammalian liver". Biochimica et Biophysica Acta (BBA) - General Subjects. 992 (1): 30–34. doi:10.1016/0304-4165(89)90046-9. PMID 2752036.
- Hajela K, Salahuddin A. (1988). "Binding of immunoglobulin G to peripheral blood lymphocytes". Immunology Letters. 19 (2): 159–62. doi:10.1016/0165-2478(88)90136-8. PMID 2976735.
- A.Salahudin (1984). "Proline peptide isomerization and protein folding". Journal of Biosciences. 6 (4): 349–355. doi:10.1007/BF02703893. S2CID 25069435.
