= Aslam Jairajpuri =

20th century Muslim scholar

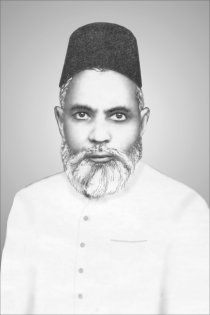
- Born: 27 January 1882; Jairajpur (Azamgarh – UP) British India
- Died: 28 December 1955 (aged 73); Delhi, India
- Known for: Scholar and writer on Qur'an, Hadith, and Islamic History

Aslam Jairajpuri (Urdu:علامہ اسلم جیراجپوری) was a scholar of Qur'an, Hadith, and Islamic history who is best known for his books Talimat-e-Qur'an and Tarikh-ul-Qur'an. He was Distinguished Professor of Arabic and Persian at Aligarh Muslim University and Jamia Millia Islamia. He was born on 27 January 1882 in Jairajpur, Azamgarh, in Uttar Pradesh, India, and died on 28 December 1955 in Delhi.

== Early life ==
His father, Salamtullah Jairajpuri (1850–1904) was a member of Ahl-e-Hadith movement, hence Allama Aslam's house at his birth, was a city center for Ahl-e-Hadith Ulema. After his birth his father was asked by Nawab Siddiq Hasan Khan (نواب صدیق حسن خان) to take the chair of presidency of Madrisah Vakfiah in Bhopal, which he took whilst his son stayed behind in Jairajpur. For his infancy years he was mostly raised by his maternal grandparents, which made him closer to the two.

His father sent him to the maktab (school) at the age of five. This school was just next to Allama Aslam's house in Jairajpur. Next year his father took him and his mother to Bhopal and enrolled him to memorise the Qur'an. After memorising Qur'an he learned Mathematics, Persian, Fiqh and Arabic. The subject of Tafsir was taught by his own father. Aslam also learned shooting and the martial arts of Bana, Bank, Banot.

In his early years, with his friend Tauqeer al-Hasan (توقیر الحسن), after research and discussions regarding the reason of Taqlid (تقلید) for a long time, these two scholars came to the conclusion that according to principles of Fiqh, laws can be changed and amended according to the time and necessity.

After finishing the education, in 1903 Aslam Jairajpuri joined Paisa Newspaper in Lahore, as a translator. Next year in June 1904 he received the letter regarding his father's illness and he hurried back to Bhopal. Next day his father died. It was 15 June 1904 / 30 Rabi-ul-Avval 1322.

In 1904 Aslam met with Maulvi Abdullah Chakralvi (مولوی عبداللہ چکڑالوی). When he heard that he did not believe in Hadith but after a discussion of three hours he was not able to convince Allama Aslam of his own ideas. Even after this, Aslam kept searching about the true place of Hadith in Islam.

== Professor at Aligarh Muslim University ==
In 1906 Aslam came to Aligarh College and for six years taught Arabic and Persian at college level. In 1912 he was put in charge of the Eastern section of the Lytton Library of the college where he catalogued the books. When the college turned into Aligarh Muslim University, he was made the professor of Arabic and Persian.

This was around 1912 when he was in Aligarh Muslim University, that which he wrote "Talemat-e-Koran".

== Professor at Jamia Millia Islamia ==
At the insistence of Maulana Mohammad Ali, he left the job, joined Jamia Millia Islamia where he taught history of Islam, Hadith, and Qur'an. He wrote many scholarly articles in the journal "Jamia" of the Jamia Millia Islamia. He was so famous in this Jamia, for his knowledge and scholarship, that if someone uttered the only word Mualana, (Arabic name for teacher or scholar), all the persons understood that he meant Mualana Aslam Jairajpuri.

He was also a regular contributor of Tolu-e-Islam. He was also a friend and admirer of Muhammad Iqbal, and visited him many times. Muhammad Iqbal also had a great respect for him due to his scholarship of Qur'an.

== His meeting with Ghulam Ahmed Pervez ==
Ghulam Ahmed Pervez respected him. It was in 1930, when he, Ghulam Ahmed Pervez, (aged 27 years at that time), read one of his article in this journal, and was so impressed by him, that he requested him for an appointment, and thereafter he became his disciple and friend. Maulana Aslam Jairajpuri also wrote introduction for the first edition of "Ma'arf Qur'an" written by Ghulam Ahmed Pervez. After the emergence of Pakistan Maulana Aslam Jairajpuri, who lived in Delhi, visited Pakistan at the request of Ghulam Ahmed Pervez, and stayed at his home in Karachi. Afterwards Ghulam Ahmed Pervez published his many books including "Tarikh-ul-Ummat", "Novadrat" from his publication house "Idara Tolu-e-Islam".

== Qur'an and Hadith ==
The question of status of Qur'an and Hadith in the Islamic history is a complex one. Maulana Aslam Jairajpuri also treated this subject in many books. Though was doing fine in his practical life, but in his spiritual life he was still haunted by only one subject, namely: the position of Hadith in Islam. This he ultimately solved and in his own words: "When Allah showed me the facts of Qur'an at that point I came to know the position of Hadith in Qur'an, which is history of Islam. To consider the Hadith as Islam is not correct. If they were in Islam, then Muhammad would also have left a written manuscript of these, like he did in case of Qur'an. For Islam, Qur'an is enough which is a complete book and in which Islam has been finalised."

However, this position regarding Hadith is in contradiction with its historically accepted status among majority school of thoughts. Many scholars after him gave befitting answers to the objections raised by Maulana Jairajpuri. One example is Maulana Abdur Rahman Kilani, who wrote an extensive book named "Aina-e-Parveziat" which addressed many questions about the status of Hadith in Islam.

== Works ==
=== Quranic scholarship ===
1. Talimat-e-Koran – تعلیمات قرآن

This book is about the rules and regulations proving that Qur'an is enough to explain itself and Qur'an in itself is complete. Based on this, his friend Ghulam Ahmed Pervez did his magnificent "Mafhoom-ul-Koran".

2 . Tarikh-ul-Qur'an – تاریخ القرآن

This scholarly book is about the history of Qur'an, its revelation, its compilation, and later development. this book also deals with all the concepts related to Qur'an.

=== Publications ===
3.Tarikh-ul-Ummat – تاریخ الامّت (Seven Volumes)

This is one of the best books written on the history of Ummah. This book only considers the authentic and rationale historical evidences in its inclusion.

4. Risala Mehjob-al-Arth – رسالہ محجوب الارث

Allama Aslam has proved by Qur'an and Hadith that even by Fiqh orphaned children cannot be left out of the will.

5. Novadrat – نوادرات

This book contains Allama Aslam's articles.

6. Fateh Misr – فاتح مصر

This book is the biography of conqueror of Egypt, Umar bin al-As's.

7. Hayat-e-Hafiz – حیات حافظ

This book is the biography of Khwaja Hafiz Shirazi's .

8. Hayat-e-Jami – حیات جامی

9. Akaed-e-Islam – عقائد اسلام

10. Arkan-e-Islam – ارکان اسلام

11. Tarikh-e-Najad – تاریخ نجد

12. Al-Wrath fil-Islam – الوراثۃ فی الاسلام

This book includes all the things (dalail) which entered Hanafi Fiqh and are against Quranic teachings.
