= Raja Hassan Akhtar =

Pakistani politician

Raja Hassan Akhtar; (Urdu: راجا حسن اختر) was a political worker in the Pakistan Muslim League prior to the independence of Pakistan in 1947. After independence, he was a Member Pakistan National Assembly (MNA), President, West Pakistan Muslim League, Vice President, All Pakistan Muslim League, and Tehrik–e–Pakistan Gold Medalist.

== Early life ==
Akhtar was born on 25 December 1904 in Kahuta, in the northern Pothohar Plateau nestled within the Shivalik Hills. He graduated from Gordon College, Rawalpindi and earned a degree in Law from Lahore, Punjab. He worked in public service in various positions including Deputy Commissioner Montgomery (Sahiwal) before entering politics. He had 9 children, four sons and five daughters. Like him, his son Colonel Sultan Zahoor Akhtar Kayani (who died in 2022) would also be an Iqbal scholar, having translated his works into English, as well as a bodyguard of M.A. Jinnah.

He was originally from Pharwala, a historical town of Gakkhar clan in the Rawalpindi District of the Potohar region in northern Punjab.

== Relationship with Allama Muhammad Iqbal ==
Raja Hassan Akhtar was fluent in English, Urdu, Persian, Punjabi and Pothwari; he could also communicate in Arabic. He studied the Quran, classics of Islam and Persian Language from his father Raja Karam Dad Khan. He embraced love for Iqbal’s vision and writing under the sole guidance of his beloved father. He had immense love and respect for Allama Muhammad Iqbal philosophy and teachings to the extent of considering him his "Peer" and "Murshid". In 1938 during Allama Iqbal’s lifetime, on the occasion of the first Yaum-e-Iqbal (Iqbal Day) he read an article titled "Shair-e-Rabbani" becoming the first person to name him Shair-e-Rabbani and Haqim-ul-Ummat.

For a long time Sir Muhammad Iqbal wanted a journal to propagate his ideas and the aims and objective of Muslim League. Sir Muhammad Iqbal was the first patron of the historical, political, religious, cultural journal of Muslims of British India and Pakistan, Tolu-e-Islam. In light of Iqbal’s vision, Raja Hassan Akhtar started writing for the magazine in 1935. Muslim scholars like Maulana Aslam Jairajpuri, Ghulam Ahmed Pervez, Dr. Zakir Hussain Khan, Syed Naseer Ahmed, Maulvi Ghulam Yezdani, Ragheb Ahsan, Sheikh Suraj-ul-Haq, Rafee-ud-Din Peer, Prof. Fazal-ud-Din Qureshi, Agha Muhammad Safdar, Asad Multani, Dr. Tasadaq Hussain, Prof. Yusuf Saleem Chisti contributed articles in this journal.
