= Syed Mir Hassan =

Islamic scholar (1844 - 1929)

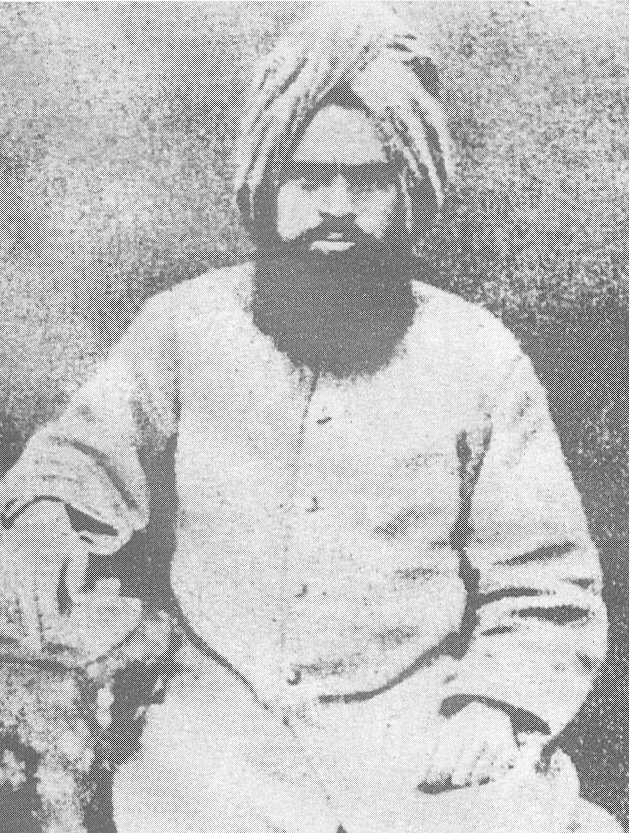
Shams al-’Ulama’ Mir Hassan

Syed Mir Hassan (18 April 1844 – 25 September 1929) was a scholar of the Qur'an, Hadith, Sufism, and the Arabic language during British India. He was a professor of Arabic at Scotch Mission College in Sialkot and was awarded the title of Shams al-’Ulama’ ("Sun of the Scholars") by the British Crown. Mir Hassan is best known as the teacher of the philosopher-poet Muhammad Iqbal and the poet Faiz Ahmad Faiz. He was also the paternal uncle of the Pakistani journalist Syed Nazeer Niazi and was affiliated with Sir Syed Ahmed Khan's rationalist school of Islamic modernism.

== Early life ==
Born on 18 April 1844. Mir Hassan belonged to a religious family of Eastern physicians but did not opt for that profession, and he also refused to take up a career as a traditional prayer leader because he did not want to live on charity. Much to the horror of his family he ended up teaching at a vernacular school run by Christian missionaries. At the age of nineteen he also visited Delhi to meet the famous poet Mirza Ghalib.

== Syed Mir Hassan and Syed Ahmed Khan ==
He was a great admirer of Sir Syed Ahmed Khan, of whom he became a staunch supporter. He had regular correspondence with him, and had the opportunity to meet him in person on numerous occasions. He was a regular visitor of All India Muhammadan Educational Conference. When Sir Syed Ahmed Khan visited Punjab, Syed Mir Hassan was the first to receive him. He used all his influence to spread Aligarh movement in his area.

== Syed Mir Hassan and Sir Muhammad Iqbal ==
He had a great influence on Sir Muhammad Iqbal. Syed Mir Hasan was "an accomplished scholar with a knowledge of several Islamic languages. Mir Hassan gave Sir Muhammad Iqbal a thorough training in the rich Islamic literary tradition and influence him deeply. It is said that once Iqbal picked up Maulvi Mir Hasan’s shoes as a mark of respect."

== Title of Shams al-’Ulama’ (“Sun of Scholars”) ==
In 1922, when the British governor of the Punjab proposed to the British Crown that Iqbal be knighted in recognition of his literary achievements, Iqbal asked that Mir Hasan should be awarded a title. When the governor remarked that Mir Hassan had not written any books, Iqbal replied that he, Iqbal, was the book Mir Hasan had produced. Mir Hasan received the title of Shams al-’Ulama’ (“Sun of Scholars”).

== See also ==
- Sir Syed Ahmed Khan
- Syed Nazeer Niazi
- Sir Muhammad Iqbal
- All India Muhammadan Educational Conference

== Sources ==
- Iqbal, an illustrated biography, by Khurram Ali Shafiq.
- Danai Raz, by Syed Nazeer Niazi
- Iqbal Kay Hazoor, by Syed Nazeer Niazi
- Zinda Rud, by Justice Javid Iqbal
- Tulip in the Desert: a selection of the poetry of Muhammad Iqbal by Sir Muhammad Iqbal, Mustansir Mir.
