= Non-denominational =

Not restricted to any particular or specific religious denomination

A non-denominational person or organization is one that does not follow (or is not restricted to) any particular or specific religious denomination.

The term has been used in the context of various faiths, including Jainism, Baháʼí Faith, Zoroastrianism, Unitarian Universalism, Neo-Paganism, Christianity, Islam, Judaism, Hinduism, Buddhism and Wicca. It stands in contrast with a religious denomination. Religious people of a non-denominational persuasion tend to be more open-minded in their views on various religious matters and rulings. Some converts towards non-denominational strains of thought have been influenced by disputes over traditional teachings in the previous institutions they attended. Nondenominationalism has also been used as a tool for introducing neutrality into a public square when the local populace is derived from a wide-ranging set of religious beliefs.

== See also ==
- Non-denominational Christianity
- Non-denominational Muslim
- Non-denominational Judaism
- Schism
- Unitarian Universalism
