= Jayaraj (name) =

- Pronunciation: Jeyarāj
- Gender: Male
- Language: Tamil; Malayalam

Origin
- Meaning: King of victory
- Region of origin: Southern India; North-eastern Sri Lanka

Other names
- Alternative spelling: Jeyaraj; Jayaraja; Jayarajah; Jayarajan

Jayaraj or Jeyaraj (Tamil: ஜெயராஜ்' Malayalam: ജയരാജ്) is a South Indian male given name. Due to the South Indian tradition of using patronymic surnames it may also be a surname for males and females. The name literally translates to "king of victory / victory king".

== Notable people ==
=== Given name ===
- Jayaraj (born 1960), Indian filmmaker
- Jeyaraj Fernandopulle (1953–2008), Sri Lankan politician
- E. P. Jayarajan, Indian politician
- M. P. Jayaraj (1946–1989), Indian criminal
- M. V. Jayarajan, Indian politician
- P. Jayarajan, Indian politician
- Jayaraj Warrier, Indian (Malayalam) stand-up comedian

=== Surname ===
- Ajitha Jayarajan, Indian politician
- Harris Jayaraj (born 1975), Indian composer

== See also ==
- Jayarajadevi
