= Jairajpur =

- Village
- Interactive map of Jairajpur
- Country: India
- State: Uttar Pradesh
- District: Azamgarh
- Tehsil/Sub district: Sagri

Government
  - Body: Gram panchayat

Languages
  - Official: Hindi/Urdu
- Time zone: UTC+5:30 (IST)
- Postal code: 276121
- Vehicle registration: UP-50

Jairajpur is a village in Bilariaganj block, in Azamgarh District, in Uttar Pradesh state of India.

== Demographics ==
The Jairajpur village has population of 5967 of which 2953 are males while 3014 are females as per Population Census 2011.

In Jairajpur village population of children with age 0-6 is 1028 which makes up 17.23% of total population of village. Average Sex Ratio of Jairajpur village is 1021 which is higher than Uttar Pradesh state average of 912. Child Sex Ratio for the Jairajpur as per census is 1004, higher than Uttar Pradesh average of 902.

Jairajpur village has higher literacy rate compared to Uttar Pradesh. In 2011, literacy rate of Jairajpur village was 77.59% compared to 67.68% of Uttar Pradesh. In Jairajpur Male literacy stands at 83.40% while female literacy rate was 71.91%.

== Notable personalities ==
Notable nematologist Shamim Jairajpuri and famous Islamic scholars Maulana Aslam Jairajpuri and Maulana Ayub Islahi were born in Jairajpur. and Ahmad Salahuddin (1937-1996), Indian biochemist, Founder Director of Interdisciplinary Biotechnology Unit at AMU in 1984.
