= Tulu'i Islam =

Poem written by Muhammad Iqbal

"Tulu'i Islam" ("Dawn of Islam") is an Urdu poem by Muhammad Iqbal, expounding on the birth and glory of Islam.

The name of this poem inspired various organisations and magazines, such as the Tolu-i-Islam (magazine) and Tolu-i-Islam (organisation).

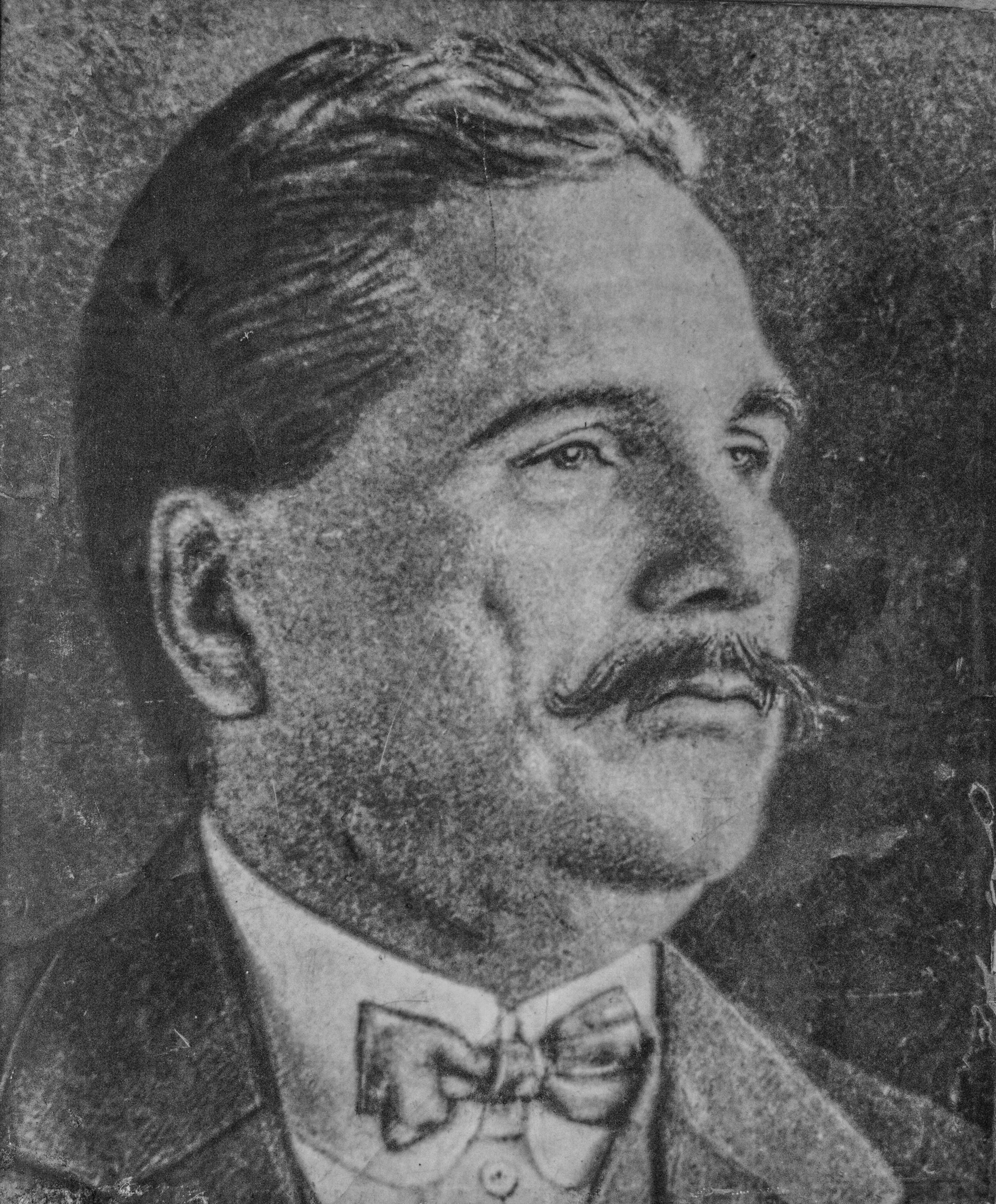
Allama Dr Muhammad Iqbal

== Verses ==
Urdu:

دليل صبح روشن ہے ستاروں کی تنک تابی افق سے آفتاب ابھرا، گيا دور گراں خوابی

عروق مردۂ مشرق ميں خون زندگی دوڑا سمجھ سکتے نہيں اس راز کو سينا و فارابی

مسلماں کو مسلماں کر ديا طوفان مغرب نے تلاطم ہائے دريا ہی سے ہے گوہر کی سيرابی

عطا مومن کو پھر درگاہ حق سے ہونے والا ہے شکوہ ترکمانی، ذہن ہندی، نطق اعرابی

اثر کچھ خواب کا غنچوں ميں باقی ہے تو اے بلبل نوا را تلخ تر می زن چو ذوق نغمہ کم يابی

.....

== See also ==
- Index of Muhammad Iqbal–related articles
- Tolu-e-Islam (magazine)
- Tolu-e-Islam (organisation)
