= Tolu-e-Islam (organisation) =

Islamic organization

Tolu-e-Islam (English: Rise of Islam), also known as Bazm-e-Tolu-e-Islam, is the organisation of Ghulam Ahmed Pervez which focuses on his interpretation of the Quran through applying logic and the Arabic Language. The words Tolu-e-Islam, meaning "dawn" or "resurgence" of Islam, were taken from "Tulu'i Islam", the title of a poem by the philosopher and poet Muhammad Iqbal.

== History and philosophy ==
Parvez, a Quranic scholar, reinterpreted Islamic teachings with a focus on logic, rejecting traditional emphasis on Hadith, and the organization promotes his teachings through publications. while Syed Nazeer Niazi first launched the Tolu-e-Islam journal under Iqbal's guidance. Parvez succeeded Iqbal as Tolu-e-Islam's lead scholar, he analysed Quranic verses with little or no emphasis on hadith and only accepted hadiths which according to him were in accordance with the Quran or did not stain the character of the Prophet or his companions. He also provided a new commentary on the Quran based on a re-translation of key verses. As well as releasing a Quranic Dictionary (Lughat-ul-Quran) which translated many of the key words used in the Quran. The organisation publishes and distributes books, pamphlets, and recordings of Pervez's teachings.

== See also ==
- Quranists
- Tolu-e-Islam, a magazine of Muslims of British India and Pakistan
