= Ghulam Ahmed Perwez =

Pakistani Islamic scholar (1903–1985)

Ghulam Ahmad Parwez غلام احمد پرویز
- Born: Ghulam Ahmad Parwez; 9 July 1903; Batala, Punjab, British India (present-day Punjab, India)
- Died: 24 February 1985 (aged 81); Lahore, Punjab, Pakistan
- Occupations: Senior Civil Servant, Department of Interior Ministry, Government of India and later, Department of Home and Interior Affairs, Karachi, Pakistan
- Known for: Islam: A Challenge to Religion; Exposition of the Holy Qur'an; The Quranic System of Sustenance; What Is Islam

Ghulam Ahmad Parwez (Note: Punjabi: غلام احمد پرویز) (9 July 1903 – 24 February 1985) was a Pakistani Islamic scholar and qāriʾ (teacher of the Quran). He opposed the Sunni doctrine by interpreting Quranic themes in his own ways which are subject to wide controversy. The work 'Islam: A Challenge to Religion' is widely acknowledged as one of the most significant works in the history of Pakistan, according to Nadeem F. Paracha who has also claimed him to be a "Quranist" as Parwez rejected most hadiths..

== Early and personal life ==
Parwez was born on 9 July 1903 in Batala, Punjab, in British India. He migrated to Pakistan in 1947. He delved into the holy book of Islam and other religious texts. In 1934, he obtained a master's degree from the Punjab University. His ideas, based on modern science, helped people better understand Islam. He was introduced to Muhammad Ali Jinnah by Muhammad Iqbal. He was appointed to edit the magazine Tolu-e-Islam, which was established to counteract the propaganda emanating from certain religious circles that favour Congress. He died aged 81.

== Career ==
Parwez was appointed to the Central Secretariat of the Government of India in 1927, and became an important figure in the Home Department. When Pakistan became independent, he stayed in the same job in the government and retired early as an Assistant Secretary (Class I gazetted officer) in 1955. He spent all his time doing his job. Parwez argued that his insights from the Quran were in stark contrast to both capitalist and Marxist political ideologies. Before the creation of Pakistan, Parwez was recruited by Muhammad Ali Jinnah to help popularise the need for a separate homeland for Muslims in South Asia. He emphasised the importance of the government's structure in adhering to Islamic ideals. The principles of Islam, as enumerated in the Quran, require that individuals reside in a nation that upholds God's commands, rather than their own.

== Ideas and contributions ==
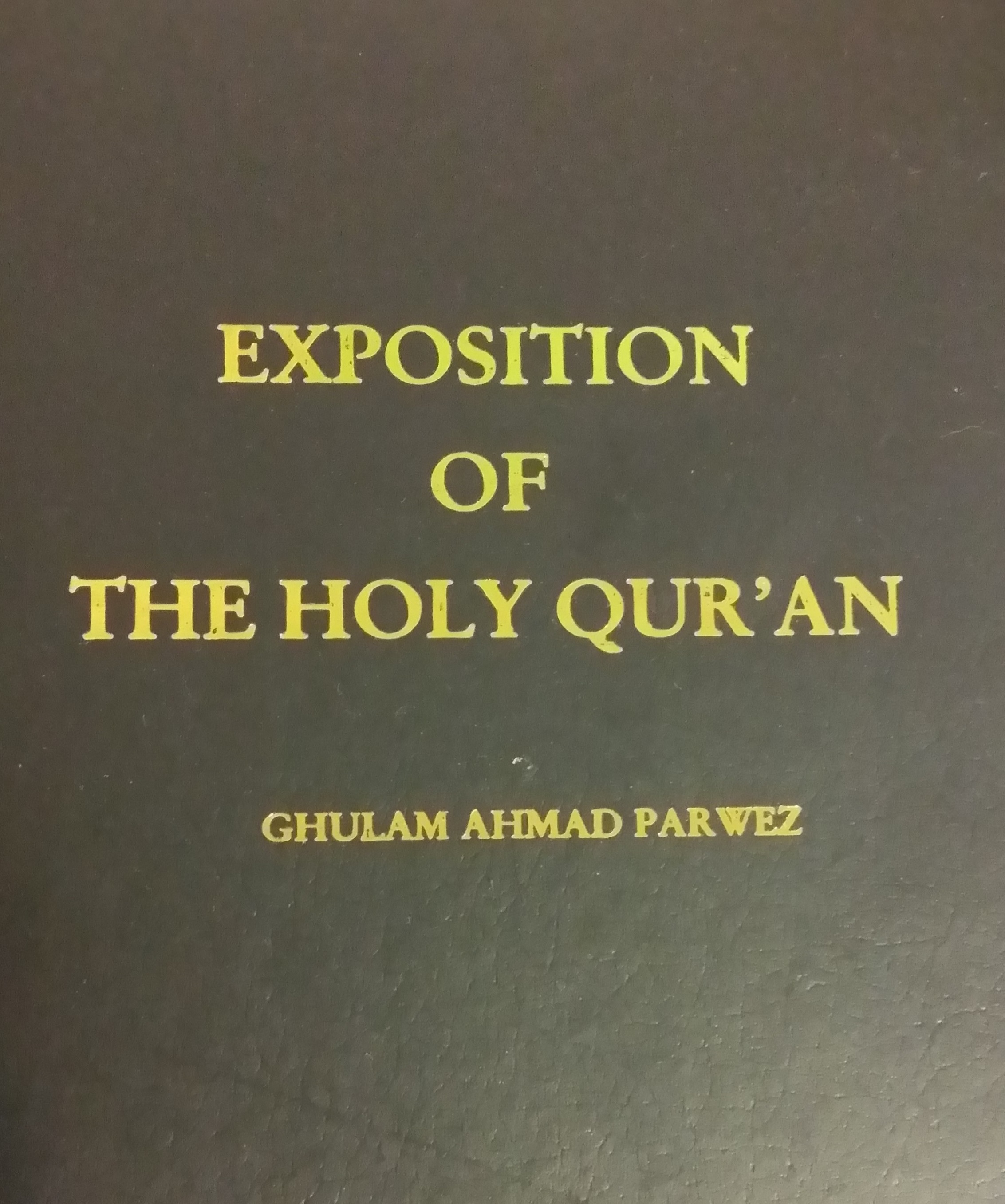
The cover for Parwez's Exposition of the Holy Quran

Even though this right almost always came before any form of authority, Parwez believed in individual freedom. Parwez, in line with this, strongly opposed slavery, arguing that it lacked any legal justification according to the Quran. Further, he said that Islam challenged the truth, validity, and very idea of religion.

Parwez assessed the supporting evidence for the suppositions contained in the Quran passages that are often associated with awe-inspiring happenings, celestial beings, and jinns, weighing it all objectively, without attempting to invoke the supernatural. Parwez also pushed for the adoption of Islamic socialism, a political philosophy that seeks to reorganise society in line with Islamic ideals. He argued that socialism is the most efficient means to uphold the principles of property, justice, and the distribution of wealth, as outlined in the Qur'an. In addition, he said that the Prophet was a prophet who wanted to stop capitalists and the corrupt bureaucracy of Byzantium and Persia from exploiting Quraish merchants although Quraish merchants had little contact with the traders from the then two supreme powers. He advocated the implementation of scientific and agricultural reforms to improve economic development. Parwez has been called a "Quranist" by Nadeem F. Paracha, as Parwez rejected most hadiths. In essence, the rejection of one well known hadeeth means the rejection of Sunnah. Further, Paracha claimed that Parwez approved praying Namaz in Urdu. Even while Parwez was alive, his opponents spread these claims. In 1960 more than 600 Islamic Scholars issued a fatwa declaring Ghulam Ahmad Perwez Kafir due to his views on Quran and Hadith. Ghulam Ahmed Perwez was also criticised due to wrong interpretation of Quran.

Ghulam Ahmed Perwez's ideas focused on systematically interpreting Quranic themes, and Muhammad Iqbal’s writings in the light of Islamic Reform with an aim to reorganise society on a Quranic basis. According to Parwez, the original purpose of Islam, is to free humanity from the oppressive rule of man-made systems of control. These man-made systems include Theocracy and Secular Democracy, both of which, are in contradiction to Quranic principles. A Quranic model of government will give the final authority to God Himself. Such a government allows only those laws which are within the bounds of Quran, and actively promotes Quranic principles. He elaborated on the definition of many Quranic principles, such as that of Zakat, which he defined as universal welfare. He also emphasised the importance of unity for Muslims: "The Qur’an is naturally opposed to sectarianism in deen and factionalism in politics. Sects and factions breed strife and dissension in the Ummah. According to the Qur'an, sectarianism is a form of shirk."

While Parwez did not reject Hadith completely, he gave primary importance to the Quran. He often cited examples in which disagreements and divisions between Muslims were caused by over-reliance on the Hadith, and determined that the only way for Muslims to come to an agreement, and be unified in Islam, will be to give primary importance to the Quran, and reject any Hadith which clearly contradicts the Quranic principles. He also blamed the mainstream scholars for allowing exploitative socioeconomic practices by deriving their authority from the Hadith, even in contradiction to the Quran. He also blamed the over-reliance on Hadith for introducing false historical narratives of the early period of Islam, also as a means of exploitation.

"Parwez upholds the view that Hadith and Sunna, as he defines them, do not constitute sources of legal authority in Islam (or what he calls al-Din). Instead, he forms the view that the Quran is fully self-sufficient in terms of its own interpretation and that Hadith and Sunna have in many instances eclipsed and distorted the actual Quranic teachings, including those that have legal import."

=== Support for Pakistan's independence ===
Before the creation of Pakistan, Iqbal introduced Parwez to Muhammad Ali Jinnah, who recruited him to help popularise the need for a separate homeland for Muslims. Jinnah appointed Parwez to edit the magazine, Tolu-e-Islam for the purpose of countering propaganda that was coming from some of the religious corners in support of Congress. Parwez's thesis was that the organisational model of the state is the basic engine which drives the implementation of the Quran, and like Muhammad in Medina, those wishing to practice Islam, as it is defined in the Quran, are required to live in a state which submits to the laws of God and not the laws of man.

During the struggle for independence, Abul Kalam Azad, a prominent Indian Nationalist, opposed Pakistan by arguing for the universalism of all religions; whereas, Parwez, countered Azad's arguments in support of Iqbal, Jinnah and the concept of Pakistan. Parwez stated that the consequences of universalism would be the formation of another sect, further dividing humanity. He cited the history of other such enterprises that attempted to fuse incompatible ideas into a singular ideology. He also pointed to the basic requirements for Muslims i.e. belief in one God and the prophet as His final messenger, precluded the possibility of any fusion. Moreover, Parwez highlighted contradictions between Azad’s earlier position in 1912, with the one he took to argue against the Muslim League.

After independence, Parwez disagreed with those claiming that Pakistan was supposed to be a secular state, as well as those claiming it was to be a theocracy. He claimed that both concepts are against Islam and Jinnah was opposed to both systems, following his "conversion" by Iqbal. Parwez cited speeches of Jinnah, before and after independence, in which Jinnah clarified that the form of democracy he was seeking was that of Medinah under the prophet.

=== Islam and individual liberty ===
Parwez argued that the Quran places such strong emphasis on individual freedom that it almost overrides all forms of authority, to the point where no person has the right to compel another person to obey them, citing the verse 3:79 in support of this view. Consistent with this, Parwez "adamantly opposed" slavery. He claimed that it had no justifiable basis according to the Quran and that the practice had been banned since the dawn of Islam, contrary to the opinions of his opponents who officially called for slavery to be legalised in the newly created Pakistan. Parwez argued that the words used in the Quran to refer to slavery should be correctly read in the past-tense, thereby giving a completely different meaning to the verses used by his opponents to justify slavery. He stated: "Whatever happened in subsequent history was the responsibility of Muslims, and not of the Quran." W.G. Clarence-Smith includes Parwez among the "South Asian Shock Troops of Abolition," a line of rationalist thinkers who took the position that slavery is forbidden by the Quran. This position was first taken by Syed Ahmad Khan. According to Clarence-Smith, Parwez was "the most significant figure to carry the radical torch after independence in 1947."

Regarding the practical methods for the abolition of slavery, Parwez clarified that because the local economy was based on slave labor, society had to be weaned off of slavery gradually. He pointed out that the main source of slaves was war, as prisoners of war were usually enslaved. So when the Quran banned the enslavement of prisoners of war, it effectively closed the door on the future of slavery. Furthermore, by highly encouraging the emancipation of slaves, the existing slaves in society were gradually freed.

Parwez also called for monogamy and rejected polygamy under normal demographic circumstances. He argued that due to various forms of discrimination suffered by women, their gender has developed an "inferiority complex", which is enforced and exploited by men. He claimed that the Quran liberates women from their historical "bondage" by affirming their independent existence and equality in all aspects of society that matter, leaving only a few biological differences between the genders. Parwez cited Quranic verses to show that although women have certain responsibilities emphasised, such as the upbringing of children, they are free to earn their own living just like men, and unlike men, anything they earn is for them alone, while the man's earnings are to be shared by the household.

=== Religion vs. "Deen" ===
Parwez argued that Islam challenged the validity, as well as the very conception of ‘religion’. This idea is considered a classical claim which had more recently been popularised by Muhammad Iqbal, when Parwez undertook its systematic defense in his work 'Islam: A Challenge to Religion,' where he argues that Islam is a "protest against all religions in the old sense of the term". Ismail al-Faruqi welcomed it as "representative statement of Muslim modernist thought."

Parwez distinguished between “deen” (a complete code of life) versus "madhab", which he equated with "priestcraft," or cumulative tradition. He argued that while "religion" focuses on rules and rituals, "deen" focuses on actions and permanent values. Moreover, while religion induces a "complete resignation to authority; however oppressive and unjust it may be", "deen" urges efforts to improve society and the human condition, by encouraging humanity to conquer the forces of nature, while at the same time eradicating social injustice. Parwez stated that: "Deen is not an opiate, as the Marxists contend, but a stimulant and spur to action." For example, according to Parwez, the concept of "Nizaam as-Salaat" (System of Salat) in Islam is much more than simple ritualistic prayer. The application of the word "Salaat" in the Quran (Parwez cites verses like 11:87) indicate a wide-ranging socioeconomic system, of which ritual prayer, is only a small part. The Quranic requirement of "Salaat," therefore, is a community based system for implementing the laws of the Quran, which is why it is usually accompanied by the command for implementing "Zakaat" (universal welfare) which is a state-based system.

Parwez argued for a revolutionary understanding of the Quran, re-interpreting the roles of prophets. He argued that the correct view of Jesus, which fits with Islam, was that he was a revolutionary liberator, whose mission was to free the Israelites from the domination of the Romans, while at the same time to build a society on ethical principles, the same as former prophets. Parwez further argued that the image of Jesus as a purely spiritual character uninterested in socio-political struggles, was invented afterwards.

Parwez also emphasised a need to re-examine the role of Hadith in order to modernise Islam. In his view, the authenticity of any Hadith should be based solely on the principle of contradiction: "any Hadith which goes against the teachings/commands of the Quran" should not be accepted. Parwez therefore rejected the principle of "abrogation", part of which is based on the concept that certain hadith can supersede commands of the Quran. His position was that the Quran is the true source of Islam, since it is the only authoritative source containing the divine message.

=== Rational interpretation of the Quran ===
Parwez's writings are associated with modernism. He supported Iqbal's enterprise of harmonising the Quran with the natural sciences, and translated those verses in the Quran which are generally associated with "miracles", "angels" and "jinn" rationally as metaphors, without appealing to the supernatural.

He also questions the virgin birth of Jesus and the miraculous interpretations of that event, arguing that the wording used to describe the communication received by Zechariah (priest) with regards to the birth of John the Baptist are identical to the that received by Mary concerning the birth of Jesus. He questions why one would be accepted as having been conceived via virgin-birth while the other isn't when there is no difference in the language used describing their births. He also suggests that the Quran not naming Jesus’ father doesn't support the interpretation of virgin birth, as the Quran also omits such details regarding the history of other prophets.

While Parwez admitted the limitations of human rational faculties, which can not grasp the source and nature of the Divine, he stressed that the content of revelation can be understood rationally. He argued that unlike traditional dogmas which justify their authority using blind faith, "iman" as outlined in the Quran, forbids blind faith and requires intellectual certainty, expecting the reader to think critically and use their powers of understanding.

=== Economic re-organisation ===
Parwez held the view that the Quran is the only binding force of Pakistani society; and thus, its community should be in perfect alignment with the commandments of Islam in all aspects. Regarding the issue of Riba, Khaled Ahmed mentions that the works of Parwez "are currently banned or under attack." Parwez argued that the correct definition of this term, according to the Quran, is any excess return on a loan above the amount that was lent. According to Parwez, the Quran allows a return on actual contributions and efforts, and not on pure capital investments. Even charging for a product above its actual worth Parwez saw as Ribba, claiming that the "fair price" should be decided by society, and not arbitrarily by the sellers. He also disagreed with the orthodox emphasis on the concept of "risk" in interest based lending, arguing that if risk was an important factor in making such financial transactions allowable, then gambling would be allowed by the Quran, when it is not. Parwez summarised his views on riba as follows:

"To reiterate, riba means more than simply ‘interest’. It is the singular factor that makes all human systems exploitative and thus contrary to the Qur’an. In the Divine system every citizen works to full capacity and happily keeps a minimum for him/herself whilst giving most of it to society. In a human system every individual seeks to do as little as possible and simultaneously maximise his profits through the work of others. The two system-types are so fundamentally different that the Qur’an even terms human systems as a ‘revolt against God and His Messenger’ (2:279)."

Dr. Fazlur Rahman Malik and Parwez candidly recommended that for a temporary period, the state assume total direction of capital and labor. Parwez's position is contrasted with the traditionalists like Mawdudi, who were criticised by Parwez on the grounds that their system is essentially the same as capitalism. Parwez's views were linked to the Quranic definition of Zakat, which he argued was a "universal development" tax collected and administered by a Quranic State. Instead of a fixed rate (e.g. 2.5% as accepted by the orthodox views), the rate would be a variable, depending on the needs of the time, as determined by the state.

N. A. Jawed states that according to thinkers like Parwez, "hell" and "heaven" are not only concepts relating to the next life, but also represent socioeconomic systems in this world. "Hell", according to Parwez, is a system where humans struggle to accumulate wealth. In such societies competition and enmity drives men to consume themselves, resulting in social conflict and class wars. Parwez contrasted this with "heaven", an ideal society devoid of class distinctions, characterised by justice, peace and cooperation. He also redefined the concept of "Satan" allegorically; as the human impulse which drives people to use their mental faculties to oppose divine laws. Parwez found support for this view in the Quranic story of the fall of man, which he interpreted metaphorically, where the "forbidden tree" stands for the quest for acquisition and ownership.

== Translated works ==
- Exposition of the Holy Quran
- Human Fundamental Rights
- Dictionary of the Holy Quran Vol. 1-4
- What Is Islam
- The Quranic System of Sustenance
- Islam: A Challenge To Religion
- The Life in the Hereafter
- Islamic Way of Living
- Letter to Tahira
- Quranic Laws
- Jihad Is Not Terrorism
- Glossary of Quranic Words
- Human and Satan
- Constitution of Islamic State

The books written by Syed Abdul Wadud, a close friend of Parwez, are based on his ideas.

- Conspiracies Against the Quran
- Phenomena of Nature
- Quranocracy
- The Heavens the Earth and the Quran
- Gateway to the Quran

== Publications ==
- Matalibul Furqaan (7 vols.)
- Lughat-ul-Quran (4 vols.)
- Mafhoom-ul-Quran (3 vols.)
- Tabweeb-ul-Quran (3 vols.)
- Nizam-e-Rabubiyyat
- Islam: A Challenge to Religion (English version)
- Insaan Ne Kiya Socha (What Man Thought, A History of Human Thought)
- Islam Kia He
- Tasawwaf Ki Haqiqat (The Reality of Islamic Mysticism)
- Saleem Ke Naam (3 vols.)
- Tahira Ke Naam
- Qurani Faislay (5 vols.)
- Meraj-e-Insaaniat (about Muhammad)
- Barke Toor (about Musa)
- Joe Noor (about Ibrahim)
- Shola-e-Mastoor (about Esa)
- Man o Yazdan (Me and God, about Allah in light of the Quran)
- Shahkar-e-Risalat (a biography of Caliph Omar)
- Iblis o Adam (Satan and Man)
- Jahane Farda
- Mazahebe Alam Ke Asmani Kitaben
- Asbab-e-Zwal-e-Ummat

== See also ==
- Tolu-e-Islam
- Liberal movements within Islam
- Ideas of Ghulam Ahmed Perwez
