= Rail transport in Germany =

Rail network of Germany
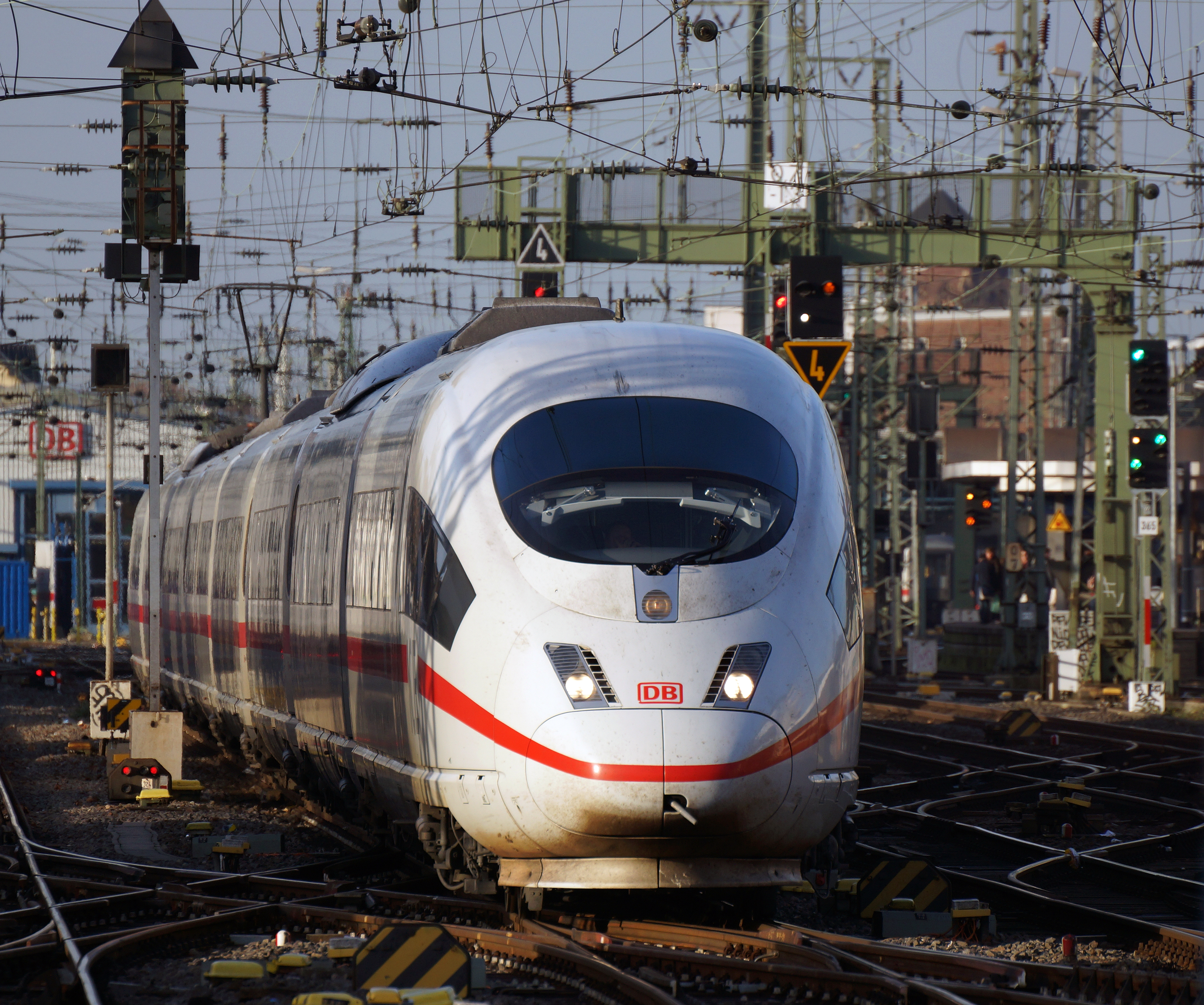
- An ICE 3 high-speed train approaching Köln Hauptbahnhof

Operation
- National railway: Deutsche Bahn
- Major operators: Transdev Germany; Netinera

Statistics
- Ridership: 2.87 billion (2018)
- Passenger-distance: 97.8 billion (2018)
- Freight: 116 billion tkm (2018)

System length
- Total: 33,399 km (20,753 mi) (2022, Deutsche Bahn only)
- Double track: 18,556 km (11,530 mi) (2022, Deutsche Bahn only)
- Electrified: 20,540 km (12,760 mi) (2022, Deutsche Bahn only)
- High-speed: 1,658 km (1,030 mi)

Track gauge
- Main: 1,435 mm / 4 ft 8 1/2 in standard gauge
- High-speed: standard gauge

Electrification
- Main: 15 kV 16.7 Hz
- 750 V DC: Berlin S-Bahn, Karlsruhe Stadtbahn
- 1,200 V DC: Hamburg S-Bahn

Features
- No. of tunnels: 1,079
- Tunnel length: 168,121 m (551,578 ft)
Map
- Map of the railway network in Germany as of 2020: Main lines Branch lines

Rail transport in Germany is provided predominantly by Deutsche Bahn (DB, lit. 'German Railway'). As of 2021, the railway network in Germany (DB only) had a length of 33,399 km (20,753 mi), of which 20,540 km (12,760 mi) were electrified and 18,556 km (11,530 mi) were double track. About 1,658 km (1,030 mi) are high-speed railway lines. Germany has the 6th longest railway network in the world, and the second largest in Europe after Russia.

Germany was ranked 4th among national European rail systems in the 2017 European Railway Performance Index assessing intensity of use, quality of service and safety. It had a very good rating for intensity of use, by both passengers and freight, and good ratings for quality of service and safety. It also captured relatively high value in return for public investment with cost to performance ratios that outperform the average ratio for all European countries.

Germany's rail freight of 117 billion tons/kilometer meant it carried 17.6% of all inland German cargo in 2015.

Germany is a member of the International Union of Railways (UIC). The UIC Country Code for Germany is 80.

Urban rail in Germany includes rapid transit (known as U-Bahn), commuter rail (known as S-Bahn), Stadtbahn (light rail), trams and funiculars (e.g. in Dresden). Suspension railways (Schwebebahn) are present in two cities, Dresden and Wuppertal, in addition to the H-Bahn at Düsseldorf Airport and Dortmund University. Stuttgart has an urban rack railway.

Island railways are present on Fehmarn, Lindau, Sylt and Wangerooge.

== Overview ==
In 2018, railways in Germany transported the following numbers of passengers and freight.

		Passenger/payload-distance	Passenger/payload	Average distance
Passenger	Long-distance	42,886,000,000 pkm	148,629,000	289 km (180 mi)
Passenger	Local	54,919,000,000 pkm	2,724,800,000	20 km (12 mi)
Passenger	Sum	97,805,000,000 pkm	2,873,429,000	34 km (21 mi)
Freight		116,273,000,000 tkm	354,430,000 t	328 km (204 mi)

=== Operators ===
Deutsche Bahn (DB), a state-owned private company, is the main provider of railway service. In recent years a number of competitors have started business, such as SWEG, ODEG or FlixTrain. DB runs several semi-independent divisions, such as DB Fernverkehr (lit. 'DB Long-Distance Traffic'), DB Regio (with several subsidiaries) and DB Cargo. DB mostly offers state-funded regional services, but some companies offer long-distance services as well. In 2016, DB had a share of 67% in the regional railway market and 68.6% in the inland freight market.

As of October 2016, there were 452 railway operators registered in Germany, among them 124 regional passenger operators, 20 long-distance operators, and 163 freight operators. Transdev Germany is the largest private operator of buses and passenger trains in Germany. Also Netinera (previously Arriva Deutschland) operates several railway lines in Germany.

In 2018, public sector funding accounted for 25.6% of the cost of short-distance passenger transport including all rail and bus services. The long-distance market generally does not require government funding.

=== Special schemes ===
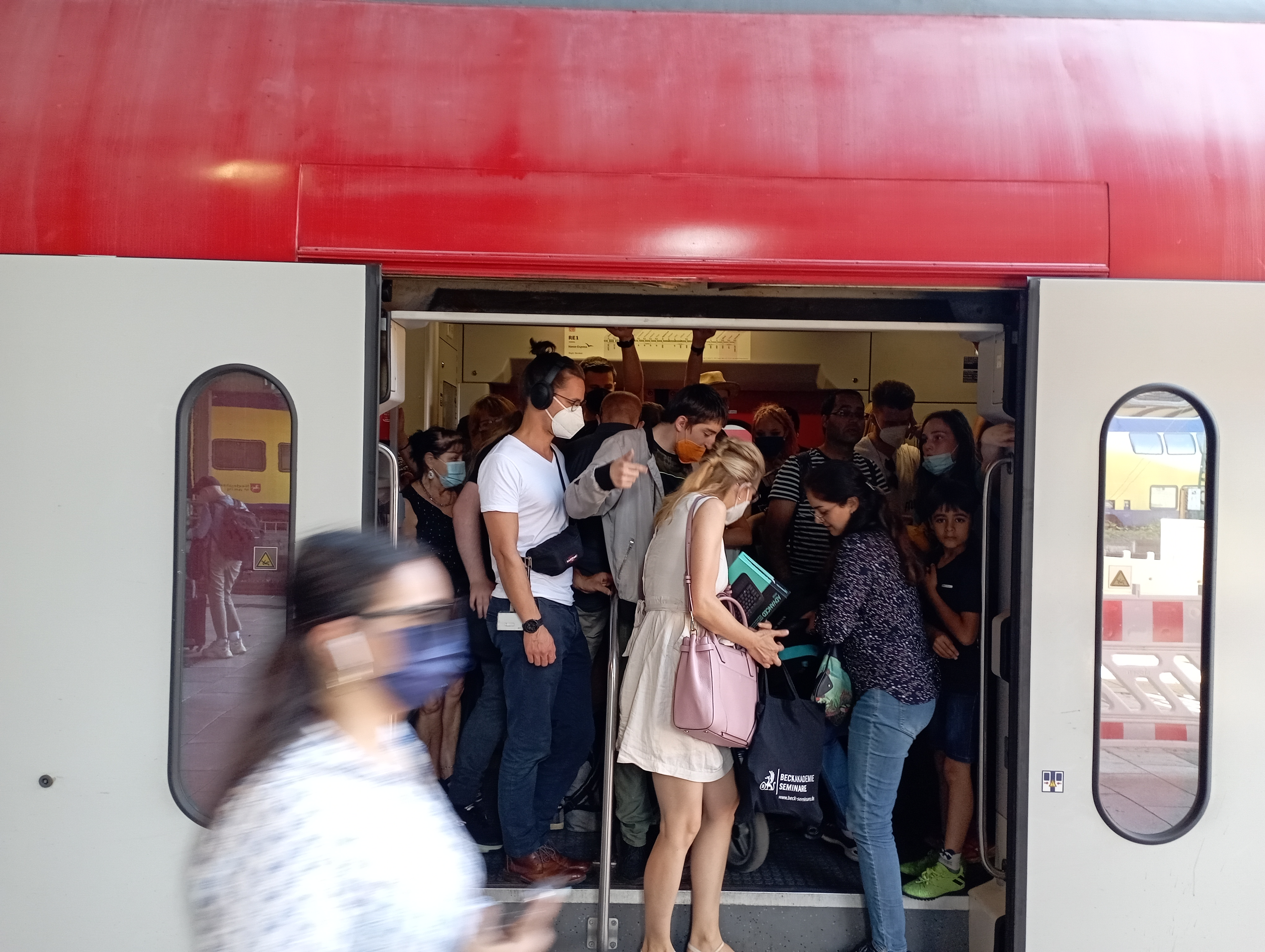
Full train in Hamburg during the 9-Euro-Ticket campaign, August 10, 2022

In June, July and August 2022, there was a special ticket called the 9-Euro-Ticket, which was a ticket with which passengers could travel for €9 per month on local and regional transport throughout Germany. The initiative aimed to reduce energy consumption during the global energy crisis in 2021–2022 and alleviate the costs of living for people. Some criticized the program, saying it occasionally led to overcrowding of trains.

The Deutschlandticket replaces the 9-Euro-Ticket. This subscription public transport ticket cost €49 per month when it was introduced in 2023 and is valid for all local public transport in Germany. The price for the Deutschlandticket was raised to €58 per month in January 2025 and once again to €63 per month in January 2026. This was met with criticism, mainly due to concerns that the price increase would unfairly affect lower-income families and cause more people to use cars instead of public transport.

=== Platform height ===
Application of the EU standard platform heights for new constructions: 550 mm (22 in) 760 mm (30 in) both 550 mm and 760 mm New builds in other heights than the EU standards

The European Union Commission issued a TSI (Technical Specifications for Interoperability) on 30 May 2002, (2002/735/EC) that sets out standard platform heights for passenger steps on high-speed rail. These standard heights are 550 mm (22 in) and 760 mm (30 in). (Note: In reference to EU documentation on interoperability of trans-national high speed rail (see EU Directive 96/48/EC) platform height is measured from the top of the running surface of the rail.)

In Germany new builds are 550 mm and 760 mm. Mecklenburg-Vorpommern has new builds with 550 mm. Hesse, NRW, and Berlin had new builds with 760 mm.

=== Track gauges ===
Gauge			Notes
Name	Metric (mm)	Imperial	Notes
	1,800	5 ft 10 7/8 in	Oberweißbacher Bergbahn (funicular section only)
Irish gauge	1,600	5 ft 3 in	Grand Duchy of Baden State Railway 1840–1855
Russian gauge	1,520	4 ft 11 5/6 in	Only at Sassnitz/Mukran ferry terminal for freight train ferries to Klaipėda and Baltijsk
	1,458	4 ft 9 2/5 in	Leipziger Verkehrsbetriebe AG
	1,450	4 ft 9 1/5 in	Dresdner Verkehrsbetriebe AG
Standard gauge	1,435	4 ft 8 1/2 in	The standard gauge both domestically and internationally
Metre gauge	1,000	3 ft 3 3/8 in	Harz Narrow Gauge Railways, trams
	900	2 ft 11 7/16 in	Mecklenburgische Bäderbahn Molli
	750	2 ft 5 1/2 in	Lößnitzgrundbahn; Weißeritztalbahn; Döllnitzbahn GmbH; Zittauer Schmalspurbahn; Fichtelbergbahn

=== Rolling stock ===
In 2014 (local passenger) and 2015 (other), the rolling stock used in Germany included the following numbers of vehicle types.

	Passenger				Freight	Sum
	Long-distance		Local		Freight	Sum
	High speed	Other	Railways	Tramways	Freight	Sum
EMUs	143		5581	6371		12114
DMUs	19		5581	6371		12114
Electric locomotives	164	228	1142		1627	4174
Diesel locomotives		29	1142		984	4174
Carriages	972	1706	4397	786		8013
Control cars	45	107	4397	786		8013
Wagons					141143	141143

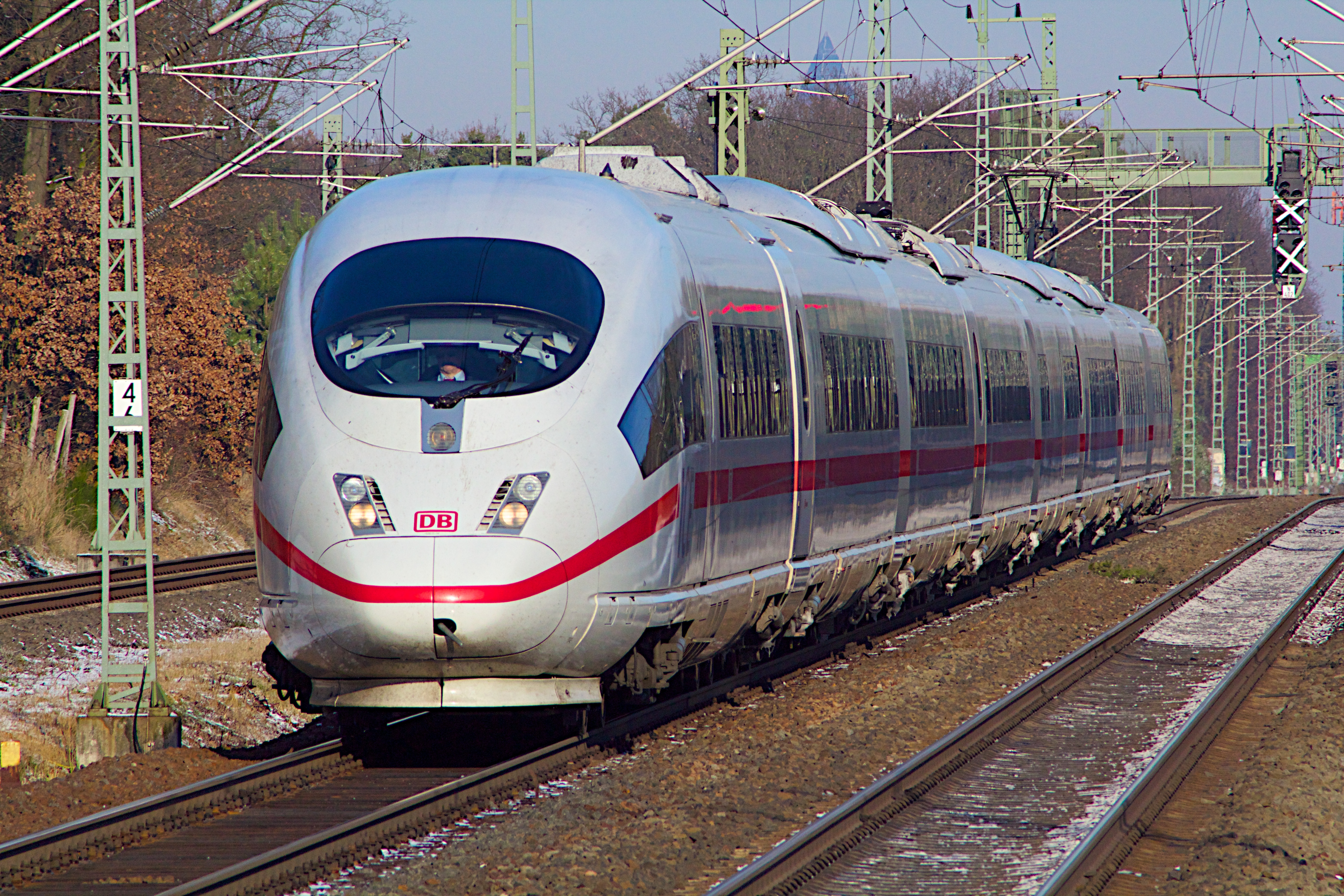
ICE 3 high-speed train of DB

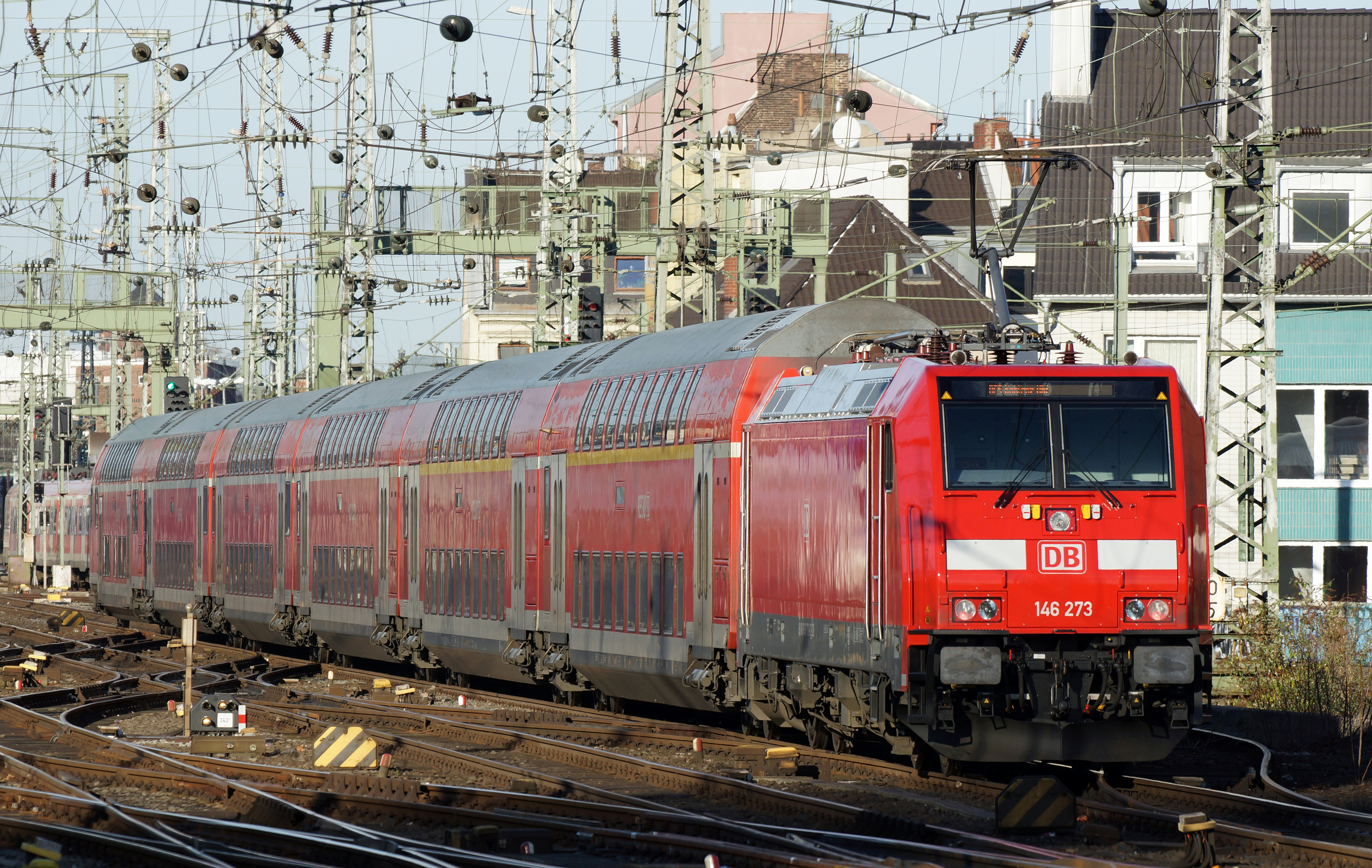
DB Class 146 hauling double-decker coaches

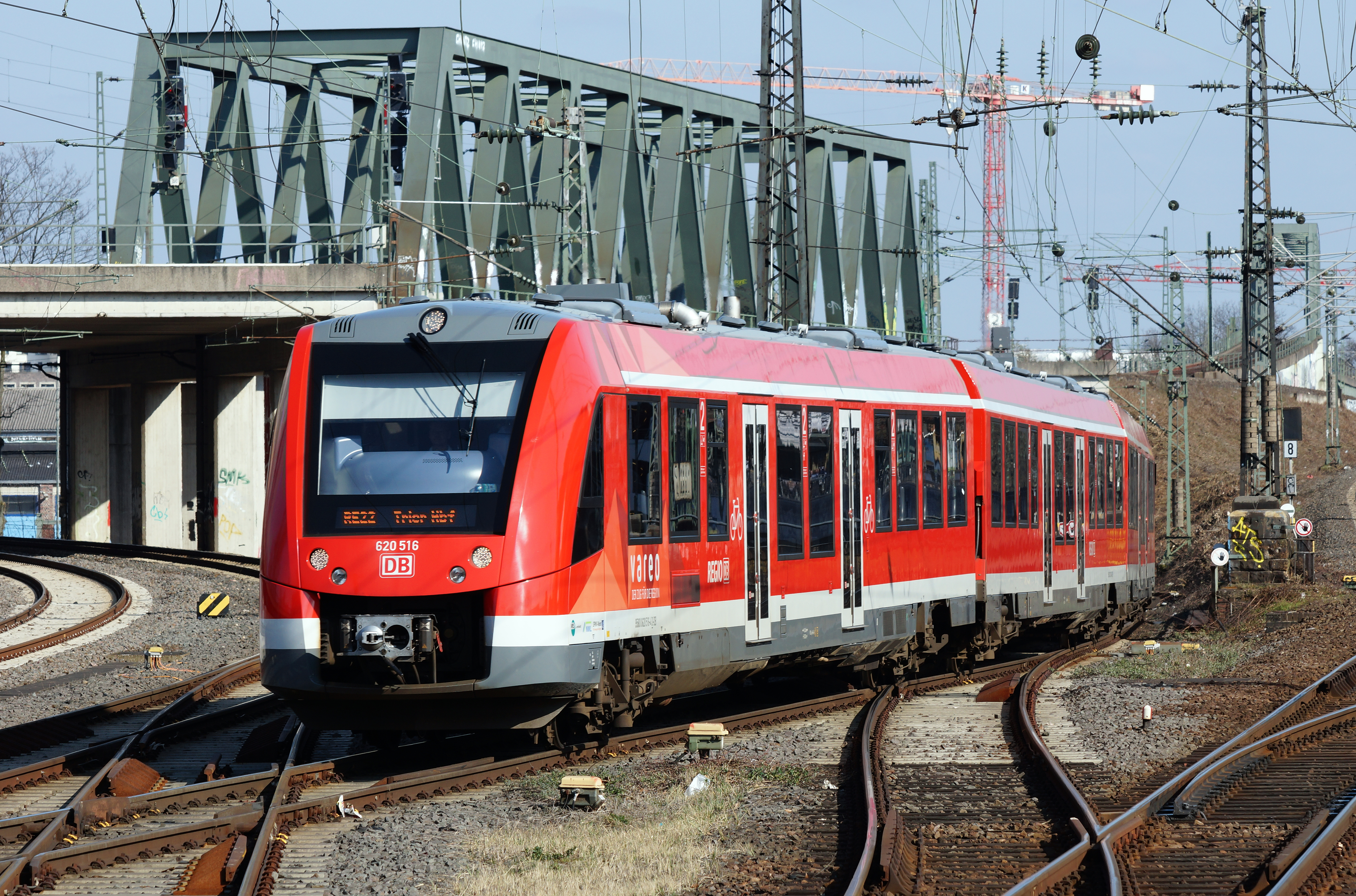
Class 620 DMU of DB

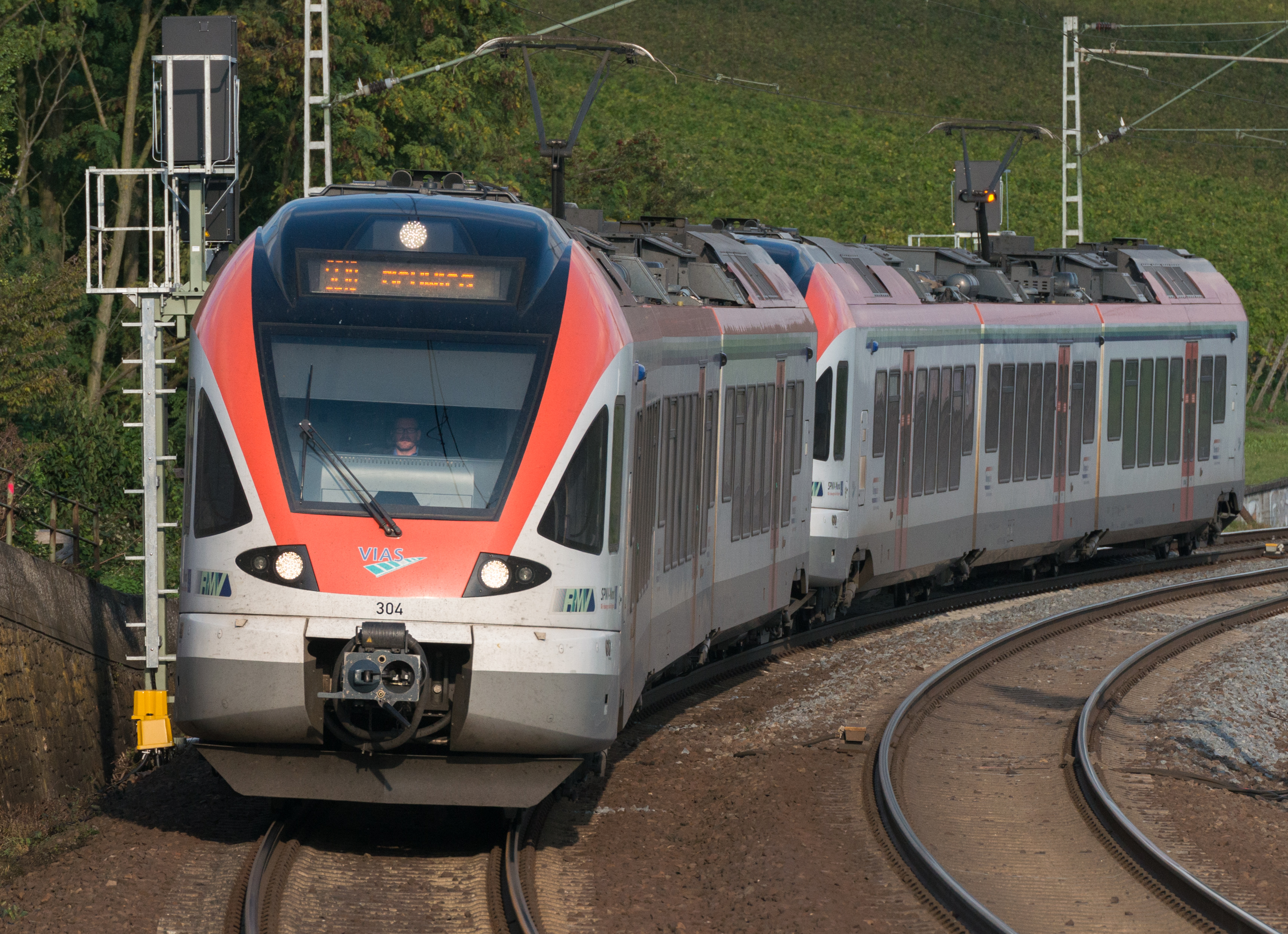
Stadler FLIRT EMU of Vias

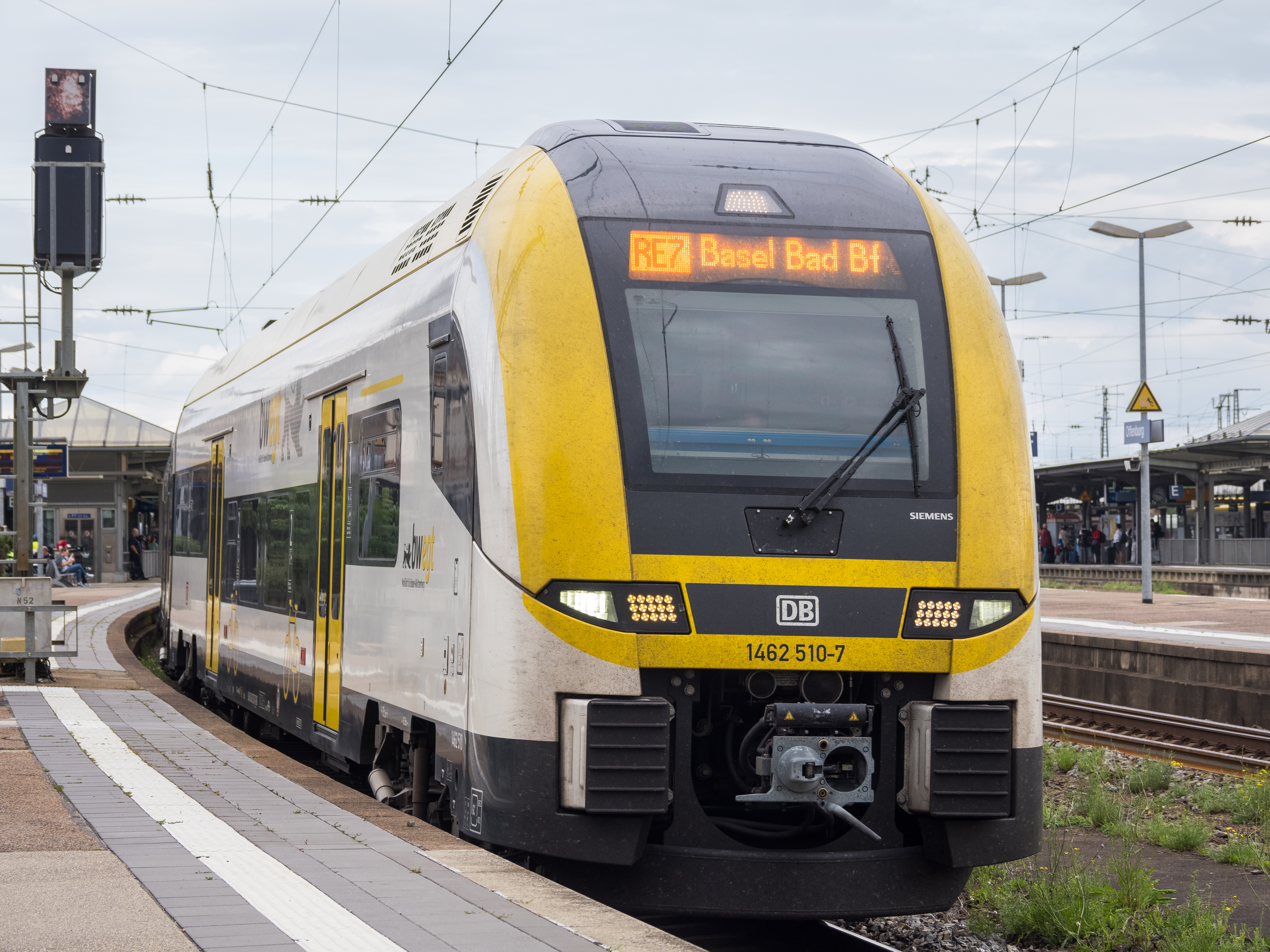
DB Class 462 EMU of BWegt

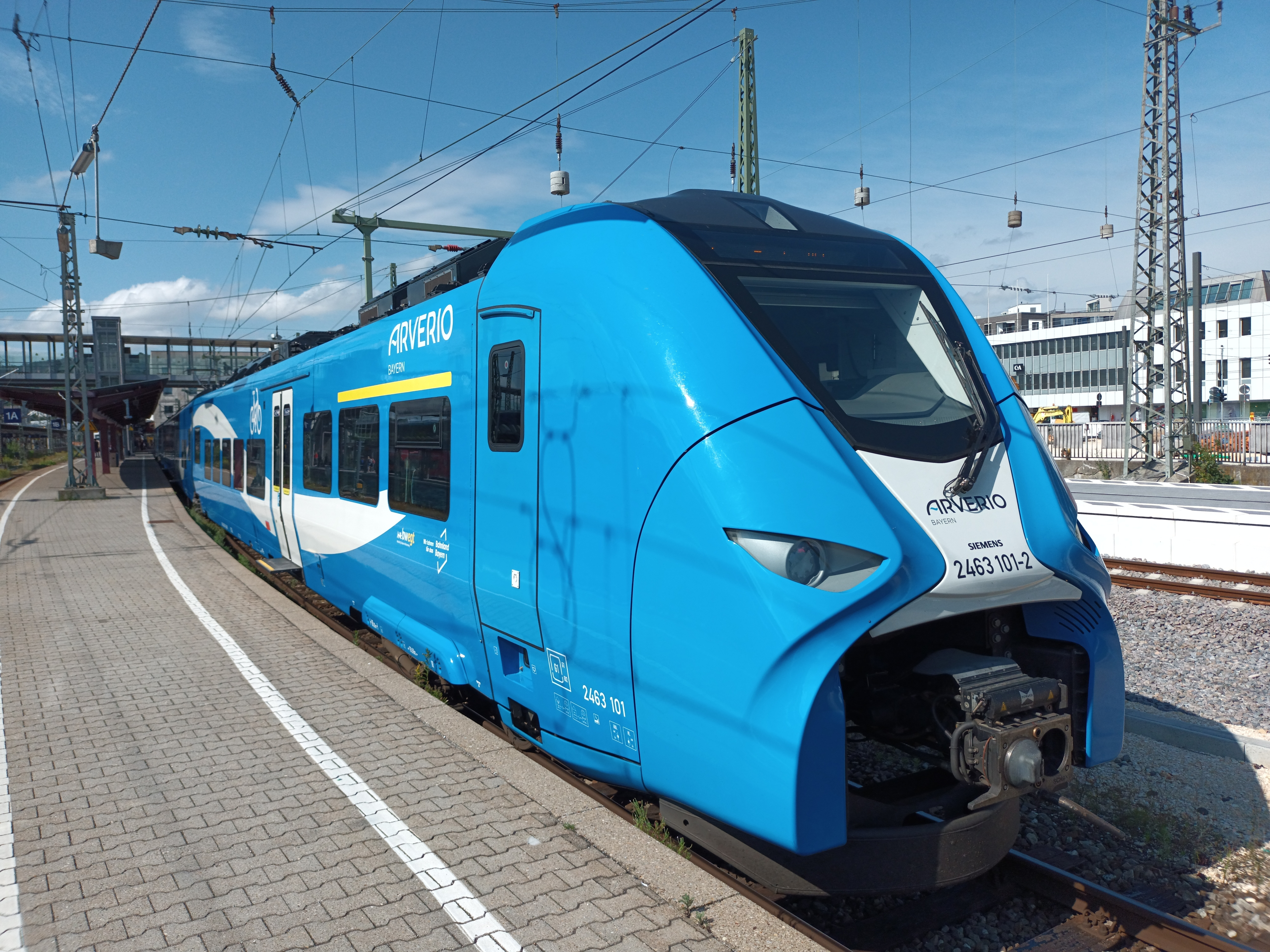
Siemens Mireo of Arverio

== Services ==
=== Long-distance services of Deutsche Bahn ===
Long-distance services of Deutsche Bahn (DB) are operated by its DB Fernverkehr (lit. 'DB Long-Distance Traffic') division:

- InterCity-Express (ICE) – high speed train, largely national but some routes to the Netherlands, Belgium, Switzerland, Austria, France, and Denmark
- EuroCity (EC) – international long-distance trains to larger cities in Europe.
- InterCity (IC) – national long-distance trains
- EuroNight (EN) – international night trains

InterRegio services, introduced in 1988 to replace the former Schnellzug (lit. 'fast train') and InterCity, were discontinued in Germany in 2003.

The UrlaubsExpress (lit. 'Holiday Express'), national night trains to the Alps and the Baltic Sea during vacation times, were abolished in 2007.

Deutsche Bahn is gradually increasing the percentage of InterCity-Express services and downgrading the remaining InterCity services to the role formerly played by the InterRegio.

=== Long-distance services of other operators ===
- EuroStar Red (previously Thalys) – high-speed services to Belgium and France, using modified French TGV trains.
- Eurocity / InterCity – trains operated by non-German companies that cross the border
- EuroCity-Express (ECE) – on two routes (Frankfurt (Main) – Basel – Milano and Munich – Zurich) since 2020, operated by Swiss Federal Railways (runs as EuroCity/EC in Switzerland and Italy)
- Flixtrain – operates a handful of long-distance trains; Flixtrain is a subsidiary of Flixbus, mostly an operator of long-distance buses
- Railjet (RJ) – operated by ÖBB, runs services to Austria
- NightJet (NJ) – a sleeper train operated by ÖBB to destinations in mainland Europe
- Westbahn – operates services to Austria

Cisalpino (discontinued in December 2006) provided services to Switzerland and Italy.

Veolia Verkehr (Now merged into Transdev) offered services on certain former InterRegio routes (Harz-Berlin-Express, Ostseeland Express) until 2014.

=== Regional and local ===
S-Bahn networks in Germany

Regional and local rail traffic is organised and funded (as the fares usually do not cover the running costs) by the federal states. The usual procedure under EU legislation is to award the contract to the lowest bid by means of a tender procedure. The respective states are free to announce short- or long-term contracts as well as to stipulate further conditions such as on rolling stock. In recent years, many bids have been won by private rail companies like NordWestBahn or Netinera, although some states have awarded long-term contracts to local DB Regio subsidiaries. The train types for regional and local traffic are as follows (see also: List of suburban and commuter rail systems).

- Regional-Express (RE) and InterRegio-Express (IRE) – medium-distance semi-fast trains for regional services
- Regionalbahn (RB) – basic local service, usually calling at all stations
- Metropolexpress (MEX) – local train in the state of Baden-Württemberg
- S-Bahn (S) – suburban rail services mostly provided by Deutsche Bahn
- U-Bahn (U) – underground train services provided by the various cities' transport bodies (not Deutsche Bahn)
- Tram (Straßenbahn) / light rail services – tramways are in place in several cities, in a few major cities these run underground in the city centre (often called Stadtbahn, especially if they have been upgraded to railway standards)

Previously, there were also other regional train types, the Stadt-Express (SE), formerly named City-Bahn (CB).

=== By state ===
State	Services
Baden-Württemberg	List of railway routes in Baden-Württemberg
Bavaria	List of railway routes in Bavaria
Berlin; Brandenburg	List of railway routes in Berlin and Brandenburg
Bremen	Bremen S-Bahn
Hamburg	Hamburg S-Bahn / U-Bahn
Hesse	List of railway routes in Hesse
Lower Saxony	List of railway routes in Lower Saxony
Mecklenburg-Vorpommern	List of railway routes in Mecklenburg-Vorpommern
North Rhine-Westphalia	List of regional rail lines in North Rhine-Westphalia
Rhineland-Palatinate	List of rail services in Rhineland-Palatinate
Saarland	—
Saxony	List of railway routes in Saxony
Saxony-Anhalt	List of railway routes in Saxony-Anhalt
Schleswig-Holstein	List of railway routes in Schleswig-Holstein
Thuringia	List of railway routes in Thuringia

== Rail links to adjacent countries ==
Germany has rail links to all of its nine neighbouring nations. These countries use the same mainline gauge (1,435 mm / 4 ft 8 1/2 in standard gauge), although electrification (15 kV AC 16.7 Hz) and other systems such as signalling may differ.

- Denmark — voltage change to 25 kV AC 50 Hz
- Poland — voltage change to 3 kV DC
- Czech Republic — voltage change to 3 kV DC
- Austria — same voltage
- Switzerland — same voltage, but different pantographs
- France — voltage change to 25 kV AC 50 Hz (no direct connection to France's 1500 V DC network)
- Luxembourg— voltage change to 25 kV AC 50 Hz
- Belgium — voltage change to 3 kV DC
- The Netherlands — voltage change to 1500 V DC or 25 kV AC 50 Hz (at Emmerich / Zevenaar; for trains to Arnhem, a further change to 1500 V DC follows)

There are also train ferries (carrying only goods wagons) between Rostock and Trelleborg (Sweden) across the Baltic Sea. Until December 2019, there were also train ferries carrying EuroCity and ICE services between Puttgarden (Fehmarn island) and Rødby, Denmark (Vogelfluglinie). The Lake Constance train ferries linked Germany with Switzerland (1869−1976) and Austria (1884−1917) across Lake Constance (Bodensee).

=== International passenger trains ===
The table includes operational cross-border services, most of which run either as EuroCity (EC), EuroCity-Express (ECE), InterCity (IC), Intercity-Express (ICE) or Regionalexpress (RE). Local border services are not listed.

Service	Route	Countries
Eurostar	Dortmund — Köln Hbf — Brussels-South — Paris Nord	Germany – Belgium – France
RJ 27	(Copenhagen / Kiel —) Hamburg — Berlin Hbf — Prague (— Bratislava — Budapest)	Germany – Czech Republic (– Slovakia – Hungary)
ICE 62	Dortmund — Stuttgart — Bregenz — Feldkirch — Innsbruck	Germany – Austria
ICE 62	Münster / Frankfurt (Main) — Stuttgart — Salzburg — Klagenfurt – Graz	Germany – Austria
ECE 85	Frankfurt (Main) — Basel — Lucerne — Milan	Germany – Switzerland – Italy
ECE 88	Munich — Bregenz — Zurich	Germany – Austria – Switzerland
EC 89	Munich — Innsbruck — Verona — Bologna	Germany – Austria – Italy
EC 95	Berlin — Warsaw Wschodnia / Gdynia	Germany – Poland
ICE 11	(Hamburg-Altona —) Berlin — Leipzig Hbf — Frankfurt (Main) — Stuttgart Hbf — München Hbf — Innsbruck Hbf	Germany – Austria
ICE 12	Berlin — Frankfurt (Main) — Basel SBB — Interlaken Ost / Zurich HB	Germany –Switzerland
IC 17	(Warnemünde —) Rostock Hbf — Berlin — Chemnitz / Wien Hbf	Germany (– Austria)
ICE/ECE 20	Kiel / Hamburg-Altona — Fulda — Basel — Chur	Germany – Switzerland
ICE 24	Hamburg-Altona — Hannover Hbf — Munich — Wörgl Hbf — Schwarzach-St. Veit	Germany – Austria
ICE 27	Berlin — Dresden Hbf — Prague — Wien Hbf — Graz	Germany – Czech Republic – Austria
IC 37	Düsseldorf — Köln Hbf — Koblenz Hbf — Trier Hbf — Luxembourg	Germany – Luxembourg
ICE 43	Amsterdam / Dortmund — Cologne — Basel	(Netherlands –) Germany – Switzerland
ICE 60	(Basel Bad Bf —) Karlsruhe — Munich	(Switzerland –) Germany
ECE 75	Copenhagen — Hamburg	Denmark – Germany
IC 77	Amsterdam — Berlin Ostbahnhof	Netherlands – Germany
ICE 78	Amsterdam — Frankfurt	Netherlands – Germany
ICE 79	Brussels-South — Frankfurt (Main)	Belgium – Germany
ICE/TGV 82	Paris East — Saarbrücken / Frankfurt (Main)	France – Germany
ICE/TGV 83	Paris East — Strasbourg-Ville — Munich	France – Germany
ICE/TGV 84	Marseille — Frankfurt (Main)	France – Germany
IC 87	Stuttgart — Singen — Konstanz / Zurich	Germany (– Switzerland)
ICE/RJX 90	Budapest — Vienna West — Munich — Frankfurt (Main)	Hungary – Austria – Germany
ICE 91	Dortmund/Hamburg-Altona — Nürnberg Hbf — Vienna	Germany – Austria
blue	Stuttgart — Munich — Salzburg — Vienna West	Germany – Austria
green	Lindau-Insel — Feldkirch — Innsbruck — Vienna West	Germany – Austria
IRE Kulturzug	Berlin-Lichtenberg — Berlin Ostkreuz — Cottbus — Wrocław Główny	Germany – Poland
RE 3	Basel Bad Bf — Waldshut — Schaffhausen — Friedrichshafen Stadt / Ulm Hbf	Germany – Switzerland
RE 11	Koblenz — Trier Hbf — Luxembourg	Germany – Luxembourg
RE 25	Munich — Prague	Germany – Czech Republic
EuroNight	Berlin / Hamburg — Odense — Malmö	Germany – Denmark – Sweden
EN Stuttgart-Zagreb	Stuttgart — Munich — Salzburg — Ljubljana — Zagreb / Rijeka	Germany – Austria – Slovenia – Croatia
NightJet	Berlin / Hamburg — Zurich	Germany – Switzerland
NightJet	Hamburg / Düsseldorf — Vienna / Innsbruck	Germany – Austria
NightJet	Vienna — Břeclav — Berlin-Charlottenburg / Warsaw Wschodnia	Austria – Czech Republic – Germany / Poland
NightJet	(Stuttgart —) Munich — Salzburg — Venice / Rome	Germany – Austria – Italy
European Sleeper	Prague — Dresden — Berlin — Amsterdam — Brussels	Czech Republic – Germany – Netherlands – Belgium

== Long distance train service ==
In Germany, currently (2026) following distance train categories exist:

=== High-speed rail ===
- ECE (Eurocity-Express)
- ICE (Intercity-Express)
- TGV, French high speed train
- Railjet, Austrian high speed train

=== IC/EC ===
- IC (Intercity)
- EC (Eurocity)

=== Sleeper trains ===
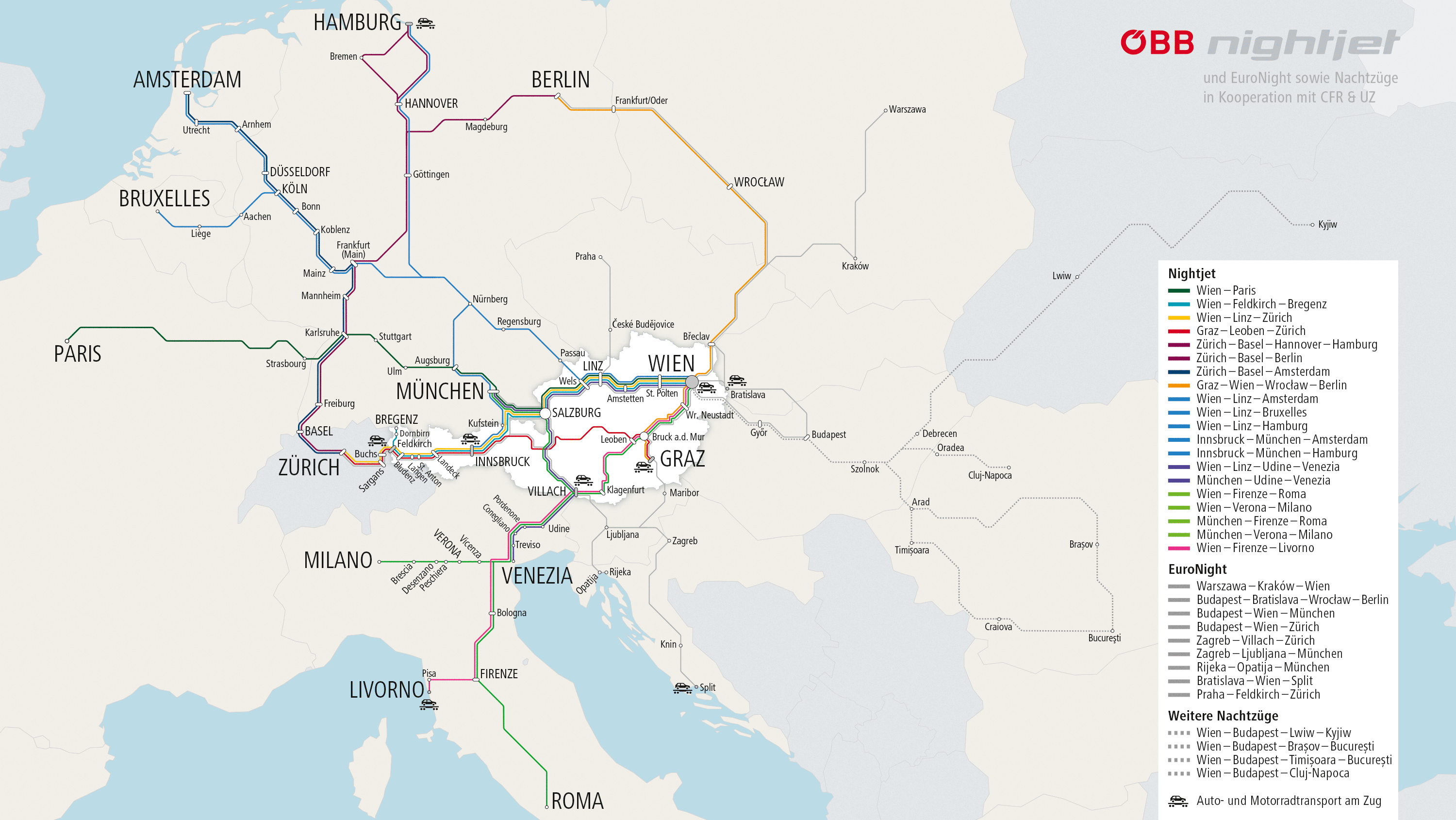
Nightjet Route Map (2023)

- EN (Euronight)
- ES (European Sleeper)
- NJ (Nightjet)

=== Private long distance trains ===
- FLX (Flixtrain)

== Urban rail ==
=== Rapid transit ===
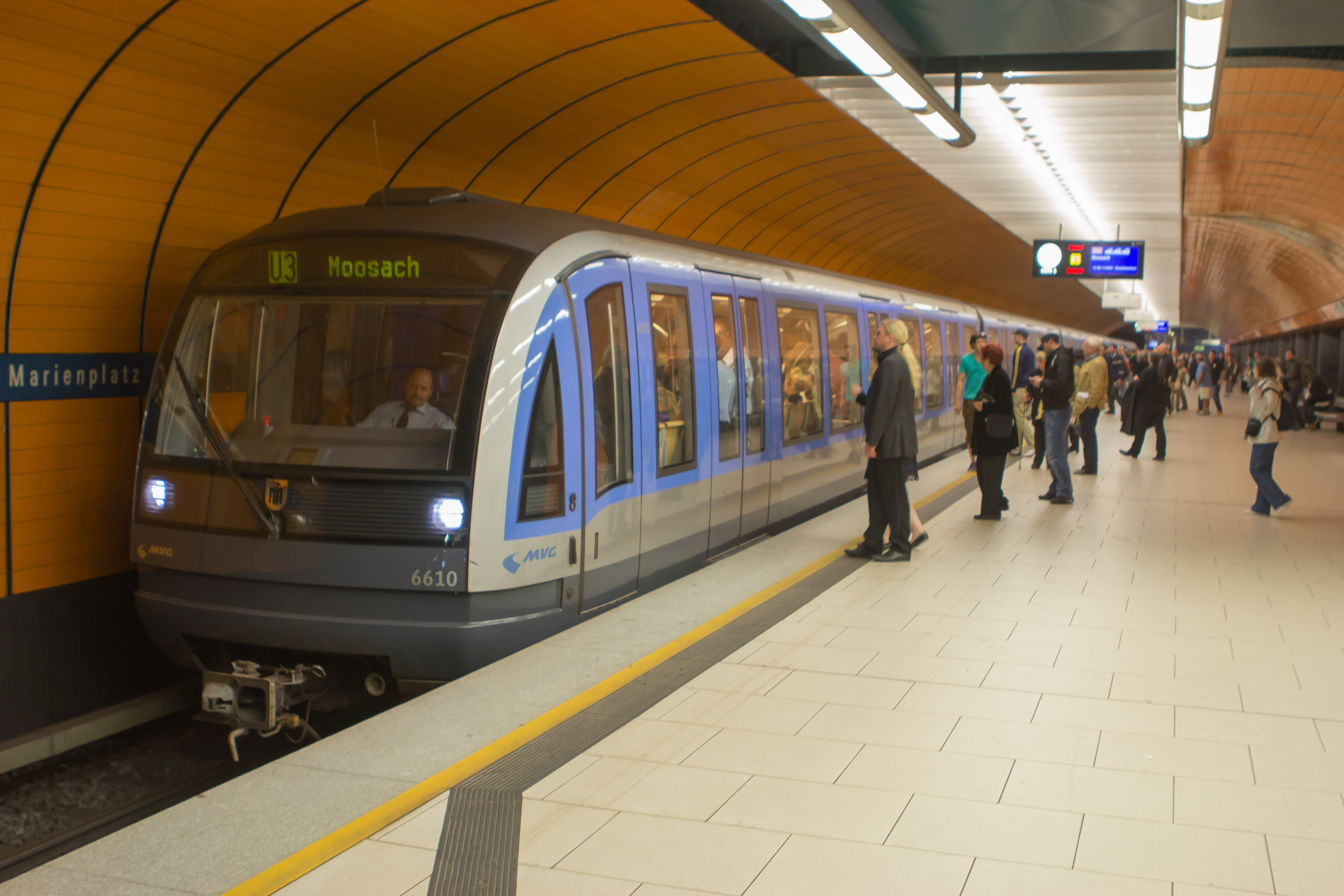
Class C of Munich U-Bahn

There are four rapid transit (U-Bahn) systems in Germany:

- Berlin U-Bahn
- Hamburg U-Bahn
- Munich U-Bahn
- Nuremberg U-Bahn

=== Commuter rail ===
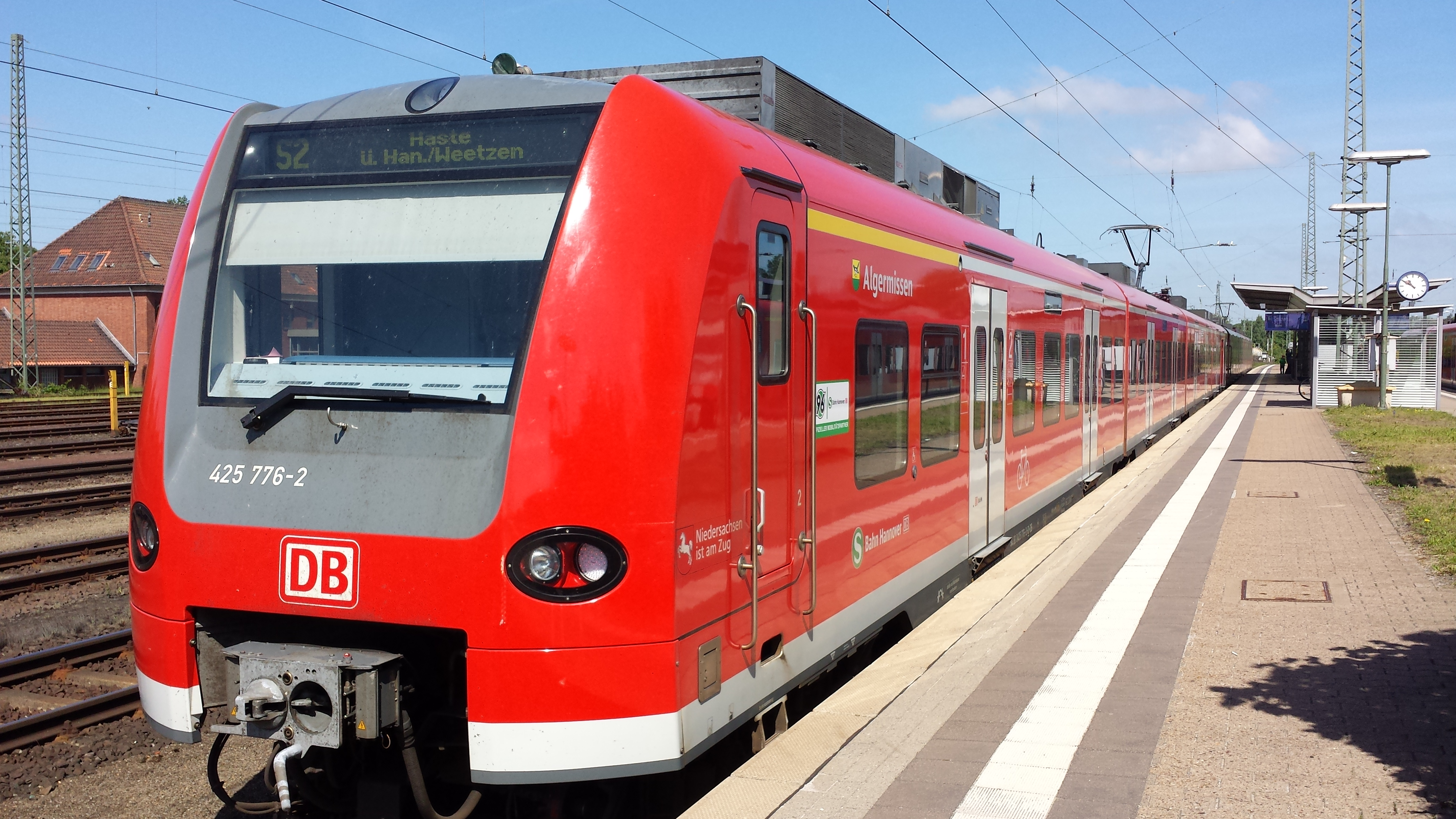
DB Class 425 of Hanover S-Bahn

The following is a list of S-Bahn systems that serve, or served, stations in Germany (cross-border systems are marked with an *):

- Aargau S-Bahn*
- Basel S-Bahn*
- Bodensee S-Bahn*
- Berlin S-Bahn
- Breisgau S-Bahn
- Bremen S-Bahn
- Dresden S-Bahn
- Erfurt S-Bahn (1976–1995)
- Hamburg S-Bahn
- Hanover S-Bahn
- Kiel S-Bahn
- Mitteldeutschland S-Bahn
- Mittelelbe S-Bahn
- Munich S-Bahn
- Nuremberg S-Bahn
- Ortenau-S-Bahn*
- Rhine-Main S-Bahn
- Rhine-Neckar S-Bahn
- Rhine-Ruhr S-Bahn
- Ringzug
- Rostock S-Bahn
- Salzburg S-Bahn*
- Schaffhausen S-Bahn*
- St. Gallen S-Bahn*
- Stuttgart S-Bahn
- Tyrol S-Bahn*
- Ulm S-Bahn
- Vorarlberg S-Bahn*
- Zurich S-Bahn*

=== Tramways and Stadtbahn ===
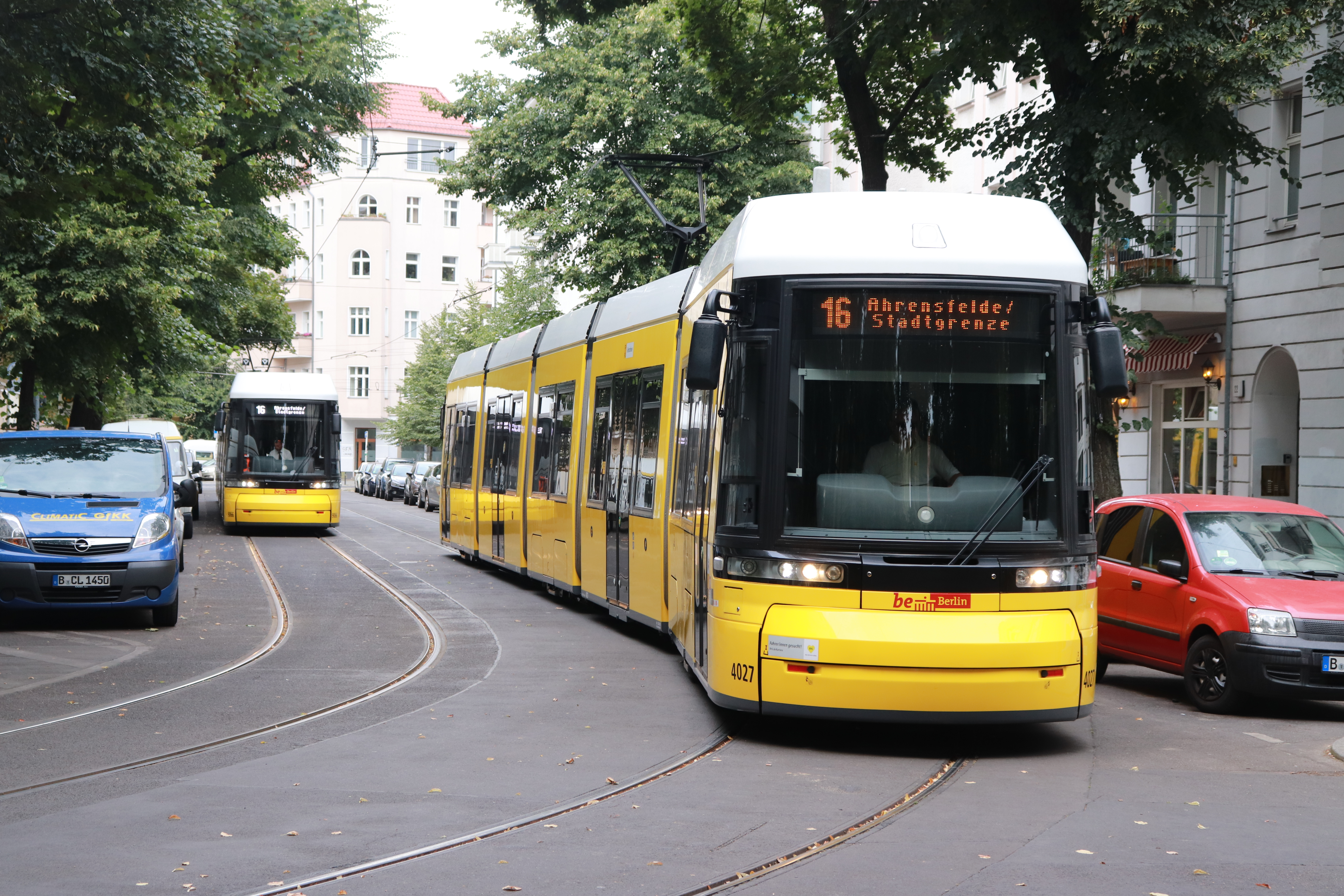
Bombardier Flexity Berlin of Straßenbahn Berlin

The list below summarizes tram-train / light rail / premetro (Stadtbahn) systems in Germany (systems included in the Rhine-Ruhr Stadtbahn are marked with an *):

- Bochum Stadtbahn*
- Bonn Stadtbahn
- Cologne Stadtbahn
- Dortmund Stadtbahn*
- Duisburg Stadtbahn*
- Düsseldorf Stadtbahn*
- Erfurt Stadtbahn
- Essen Stadtbahn*
- Karlsruhe Stadtbahn
- Kassel RegioTram
- Frankfurt (Main) Stadtbahn
- Saarbahn
- Stuttgart Stadtbahn
- Trams in Chemnitz
- Trams in Görlitz
- Trams in Leipzig

== History ==
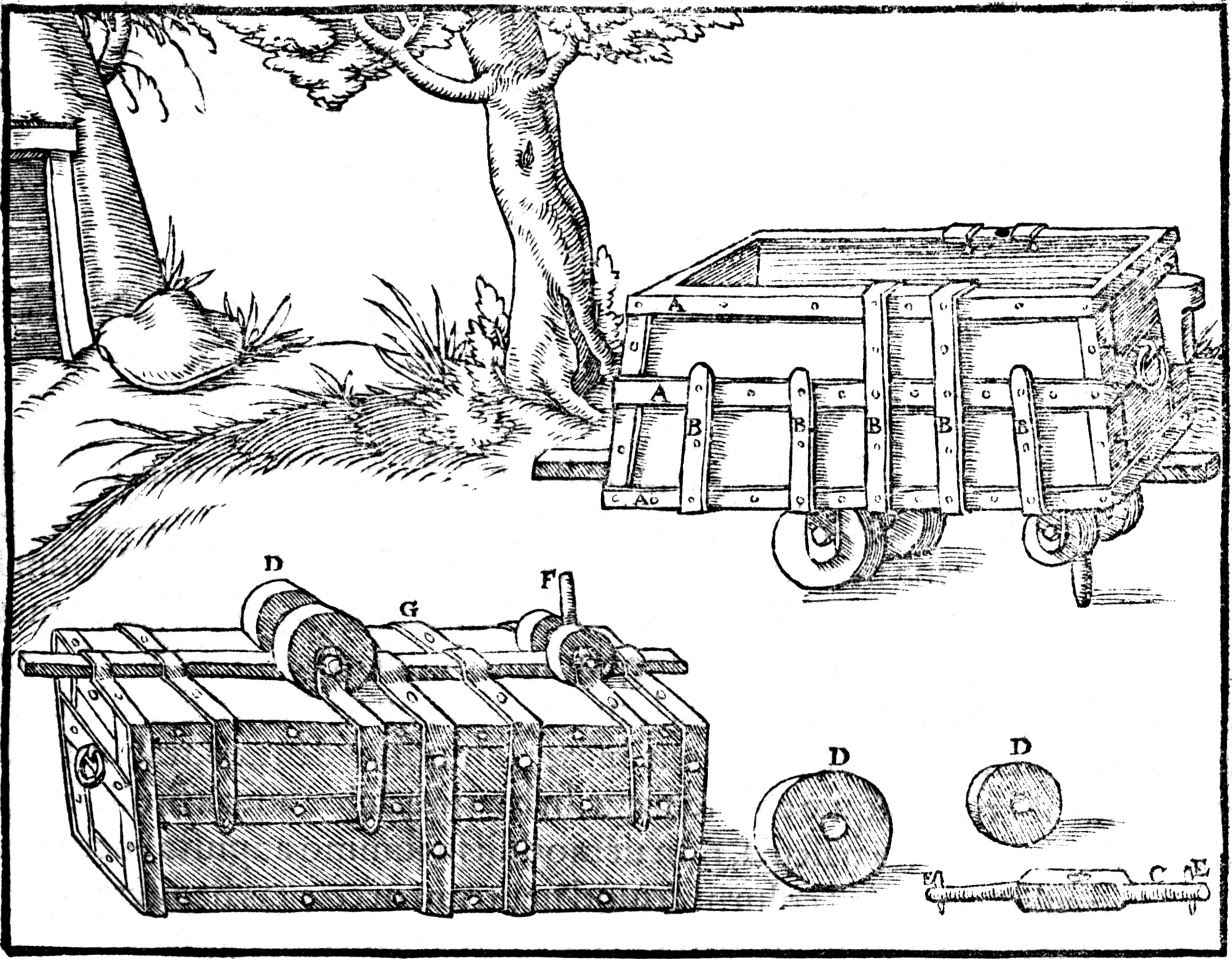
A German mine cart with a guide pin (in Fig. F), in a 1556 drawing by Georgius Agricola (De re metallica Libri XII), the forerunner of all modern railway wagons

The earliest form of railways, wagonways, were developed in Germany in the 16th century. A wagonway operation was illustrated in Germany in 1556 by Georgius Agricola (image right) in his work De re metallica. This line used "Hund" carts with unflanged wheels running on wooden planks and a vertical pin on the cart fitting into the gap between the planks to keep it going the right way. The miners called the wagons Hunde ("dogs") from the noise they made on the tracks. Such wagonways soon became very popular in Europe.

Modern German rail history officially began with the opening of the steam-hauled Bavarian Ludwig Railway between Nuremberg and Fürth on 7 December 1835. The first long-distance railway was the Leipzig-Dresden railway, completed on 7 April 1839. The Dresden Leipzig railway station was the first railway station in Dresden and was the terminus of the first German long-distance railway Leipzig–Dresden. The following years saw a rapid growth: By the year 1845, there were already more than 2,000 kilometres (1,200 mi) of railroads in Germany, and ten years later that number was above 8,000.

German unification in 1871 stimulated consolidation, nationalization into state-owned companies, and further rapid growth. Unlike the situation in France, the goal was support of industrialization, and so heavy lines crisscrossed the Ruhr and other industrial districts and provided good connections to the major ports of Hamburg and Bremen. By 1880, Germany had 9,400 locomotives pulling 43,000 passengers and 30,000 tons of freight, and forged ahead of France. 1915 Leipzig Hauptbahnhof had become one of the largest stations worldwide.

Under the Weimar Republic, the Deutsche Reichseisenbahnen (later Deutsche Reichsbahn) was created on 1 April 1920.

During the Second World War, austere versions of the standard locomotives were produced to speed up construction times and minimise the use of imported materials. These were the so-called war locomotives (Kriegslokomotiven and Übergangskriegslokomotiven). Absent a good highway network and trucks, the Germans relied heavily on the railways, supplemented by slower river and canal transport for bulk goods.

After the war, the German railway system was split into the Deutsche Bundesbahn of West Germany and the Deutsche Reichsbahn of East Germany.

In 1989, the Berlin Wall fell. Train frequency rapidly increased on the existing East/West corridors; closed links which had formerly crossed the border were re-opened. On 3 October 1990, Germany was reunified; however, this was not immediately the case with the railways. Administrative and organisational problems led to the decision to completely re-organise and reconnect Germany's railways. The so-called Bahnreform (Railway Reform) came into effect on 1 January 1994, when the two state railways were formally reunited to form the current German Railway Corporation (Deutsche Bahn). At the time the Bahnreform was seen as a "first step" towards future railway privatization and Deutsche Bahn operates as a joint stock company (AG) even though the federal government owns all stocks. However, plans for privatization were delayed by the Great Recession and ultimately cancelled altogether. The railway sector was however liberalized insofar as Deutsche Bahn lost its railway monopoly status in 1996; regional services are now subject to open bidding ("Regionalisierung" or "regionalization", as the responsibility for local rail services was transferred from the federal government to the 16 state governments) whereas long-distance services are subject to open access operation. However, while the share of DB in the market of regional rail has declined since 1994 - in the context of an overall expanding market of regional rail service - the vast majority of long-distance trains are still operated by or in cooperation with Deutsche Bahn AG.

The German railways were long protected from competition from intercity buses on journeys over 50 km (31 mi). However, in 2013, this protection was removed, leading to a significant shift from rail to bus for long journeys.

=== National strikes ===
- 2007, by the locomotive engineers union
- 2021, by Deutsche Bahn workers

== See also ==
- Federal Railway Authority
- German Railway Union
- List of named passenger trains of Germany
- Rail transport by country
- Rail transport in Europe
- Railway divisions in Germany
- Transport in Germany
