= Völkerfreundschaft =

Völkerfreundschaft means "peoples' friendship" in the German language. It may refer to:

- MS Völkerfreundschaft, the former name of the cruise ship MV Astoria
- Star of People's Friendship (German: Stern der Völkerfreundschaft), an order awarded by East Germany
- Fountain of Friendship between Peoples (German: Brunnen der Völkerfreundschaft), a fountain in Berlin, at the Alexanderplatz
- Platz der Völkerfreundschaft (German: People's Friendship Square, lit. 'Friendship Between Peoples Place'), the central public square in Rieth (Erfurt), Thuringia, Germany
- Völkerfreundschaft (German: International Friendship, lit. 'Friendship Between People'), a subdivision in Zeitz, Burgenlandkreis, Saxony-Anhalt, Germany
- Amerikahaus (German: Haus der Völkerfreundschaft, lit. 'Peoples' Friendship House'), an American cultural center in Westend (Frankfurt am Main), Germany

== See also ==
- The dictionary definition of Völker at Wiktionary
- The dictionary definition of Völkerschaft at Wiktionary
- The dictionary definition of Freundschaft at Wiktionary
- The dictionary definition of Freund at Wiktionary
- The dictionary definition of Schaft at Wiktionary
