= Erfurt S-Bahn =

German colloquial term

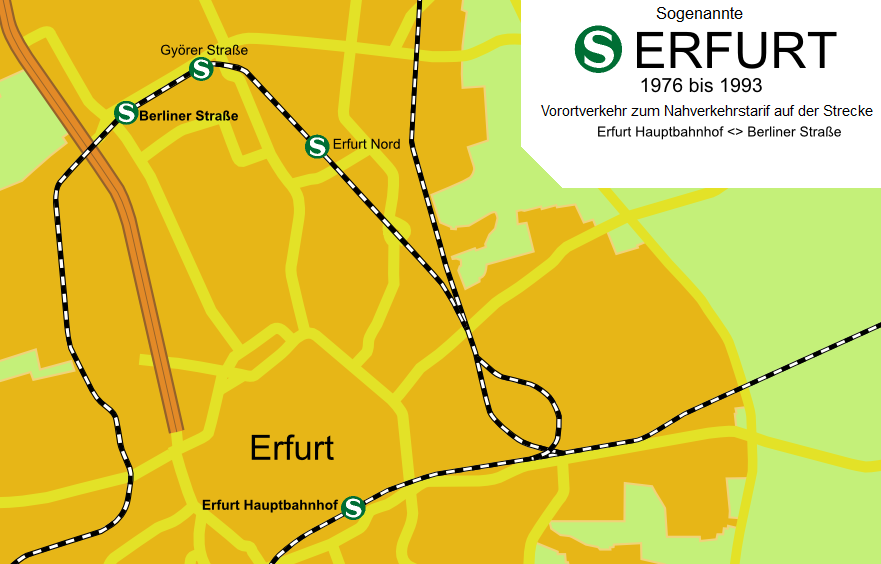
General map of the route travelled by the "S-Bahn Erfurt" trains

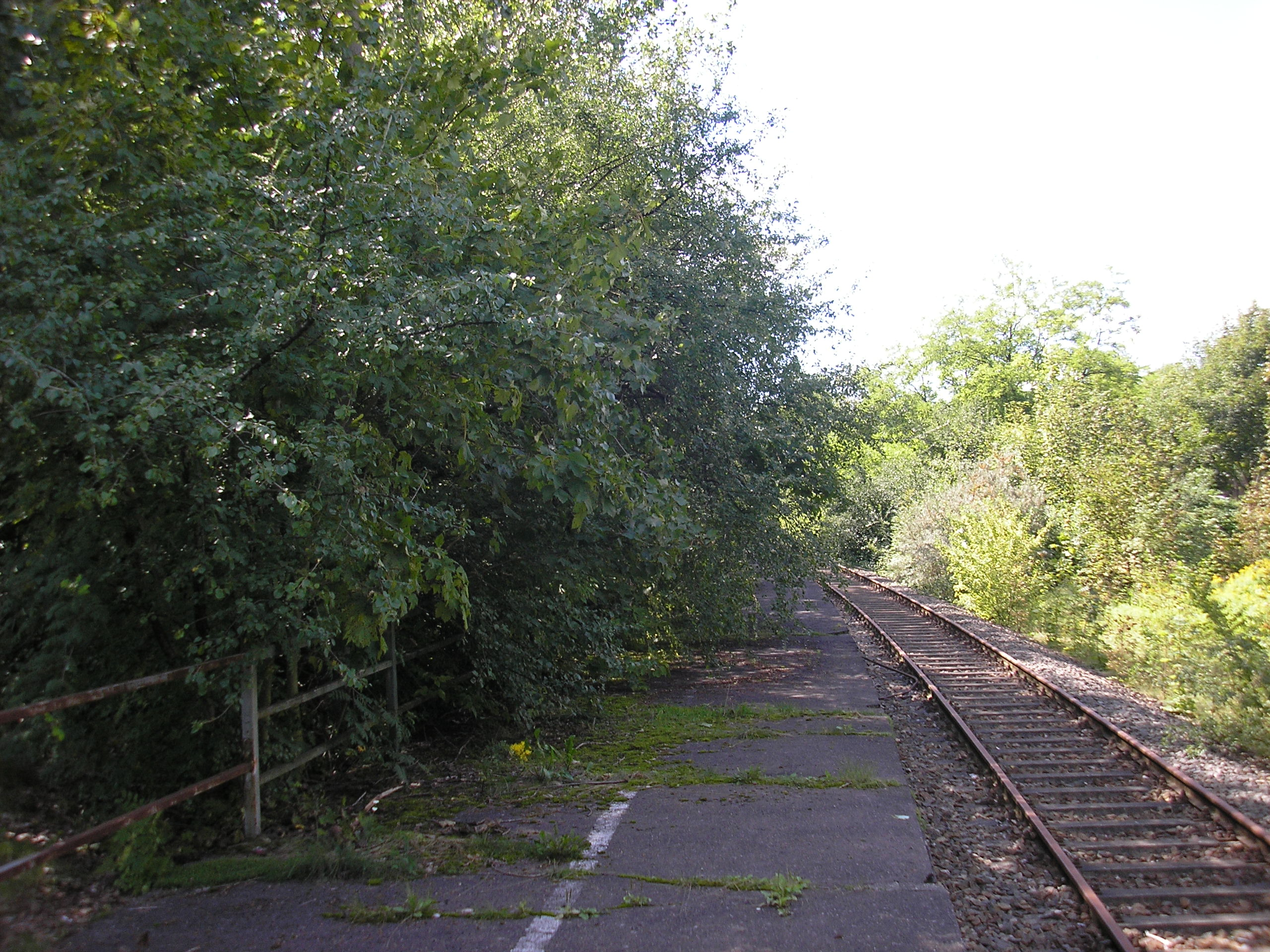
Platform of the former Erfurt Berliner Straße stop in 2010

S-Bahn Erfurt was a colloquial term for a diesel-powered railway connection that existed from 1976 to 1995 in the Thuringian state capital Erfurt, Germany. The term "S-Bahn" is also occasionally used in popular literature. Other contemporary media used terms such as "suburban traffic at the local transport tariff" to describe it. When the line was introduced in 1976, only the "reversible train service" on this line was highlighted as a special feature. In the Kursbuch tables of Deutsche Reichsbahn, the terms "S-Bahn" or "S-Bahn-Tarif" were not used for this line. Riethschleuder was another colloquial term for the connection.

== Route description ==
Starting at Erfurt Hauptbahnhof, the line ran in a semicircle north and east around the city centre. It used the Wolkramshausen-Erfurt railway line route as far as Erfurt Nord station. There it branched off to the west and, using the route of the former Erfurt–Nottleben light railway, developed the new development areas in the north of Erfurt. The four stations served were the stations Erfurt Hauptbahnhof and Erfurt Nord which still exist today, as well as the former stop Erfurt Györer Straße and the former terminal Erfurt Berliner Straße station. The journey time over the entire route was 13 to 14 minutes.

== Operation and history ==
The construction of the new Rieth development area in the north of the city of Erfurt made it necessary to connect this part of the city to the city centre. The existing Erfurt tramway and the supplementary bus lines run by the city's public transport company (Erfurter Verkehrsbetriebe) could no longer meet the growing demand for transport at peak times. Since the track of the former Nebenbahn railway to Nottleben ran directly through the residential area, a plan was drawn up to set up a railway connection between the north of the city and Erfurt's main railway station (Hauptbahnhof) in order to relieve the urban local traffic.

Since all the tracks were already in place, only two new stations had to be built. Thus, the connection could be opened on 13 May 1976 after a construction period of only three months. The line length was 8.6 kilometres, of which 2.7 kilometres were on the line of the former light railway. In the Kursbuch of Deutsche Reichsbahn, the line was listed under route number 642. There was no interval timetable. The trains operated only during the rush hours. On working days, eight (1985) or nine (1990) train pairs commuted on the line. Half of the trains only travelled to or from Erfurt Nord. There were connections to trains in the direction of Erfurt Hauptbahnhof. Because the main patronage of the S-Bahn came from workers of the VEB Pressen- und Scherenbau "Henry Pels" (later VEB Umformtechnik Erfurt "Herbert Warnke"; factory currently owned by the Schuler Group), as well as DR employees, traffic was suspended on Saturdays, Sundays and public holidays.

The only characteristic of the S-Bahn was its independent tariff. Instead of the distance-based tariff generally used by the Deutsche Reichsbahn, a flat-rate tariff was applied. Single tickets were sold in advance at a price of 20 pfennig. They had to be validated before boarding the trains on the platform. They were sold at Erfurt Hauptbahnhof and Erfurt Nord stations. However, the special fare was abolished shortly after German reunification, i.e. before the line was discontinued.

After the political changes of 1989 and 1990, the transport needs of the population changed. In particular, traffic peaks in rush hour traffic were distorted. Since the travel times by tram to the main station were similarly long but significantly shorter in the direction of the city centre, a separate train connection became superfluous. The connection was thinned out and then completely closed on 28 May 1995. At the time of its closure, two pairs of trains operated a day. In 2003, the Erfurt Nord-Erfurt-Marbach line was officially shut down by the Eisenbahnbundesamt. The renovation of the Mittelhäuser Kreuz in 2012 meant that the Mittelhäuser Straße was renovated a bit and the track of the former railway crossing was removed.

In preparation for the Bundesgartenschau 2021 in Erfurt, the idea was born in 2015 to revive the route in order to bring visitors from Erfurt Hauptbahnhof to the Gera-Aue. Alternative ideas would be a cycle path or a trolley route.

== Rolling stock ==
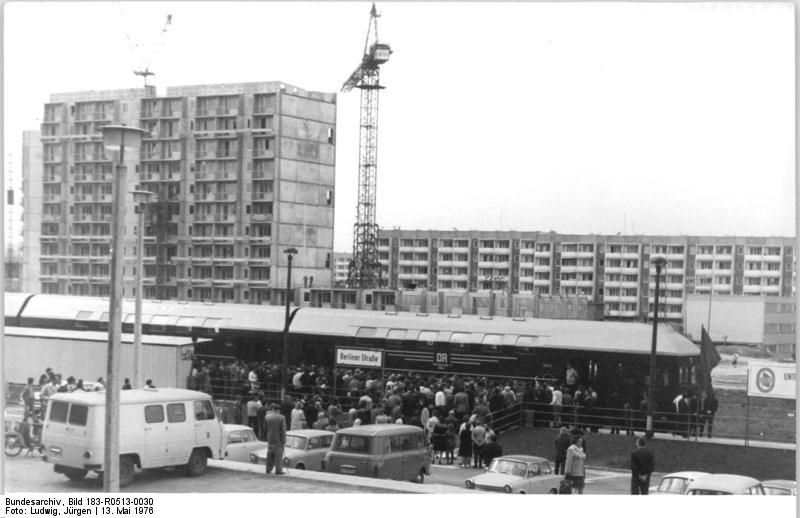
1976: A double-decker turning train at the Erfurt Berliner Straße station

Until 1994, double-decker articulated push-pull trains in four-car formation manufactured by VEB Waggonbau Görlitz (basically, a predecessor of the modern-day Bombardier Double-deck Coach) were primarily used on the Erfurt S-Bahn, pulled by DR Class 100 locomotives (from 1992 reclassified as DR Class 202). This meant that it was not necessary to build a reversing track or turn back siding at the end of the line. In its final year of operation, two three-car DB Class 614 diesel multiple units were used.

== Literature ==
- Günther Barthel: Die Geschichte der Kleinbahn Erfurt (West)–Nottleben. 1. Auflage 2001, Verlag Rockstuhl. ISBN 3-934748-29-5
