= Rieth (Erfurt) =

District in Erfurt, Germany

Coordinates: 51.0047°N 11.0156°E

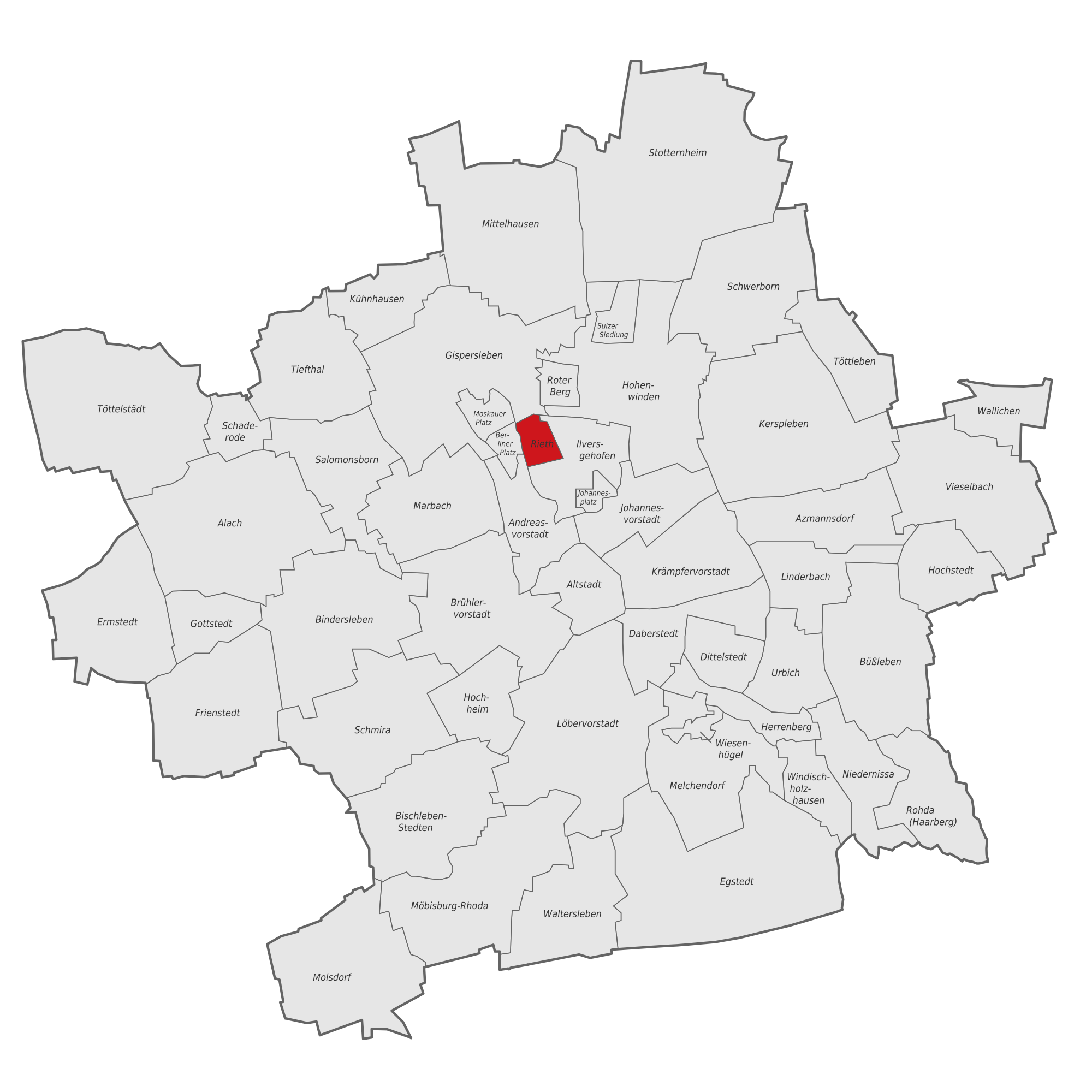
Location of Rieth in Erfurt.

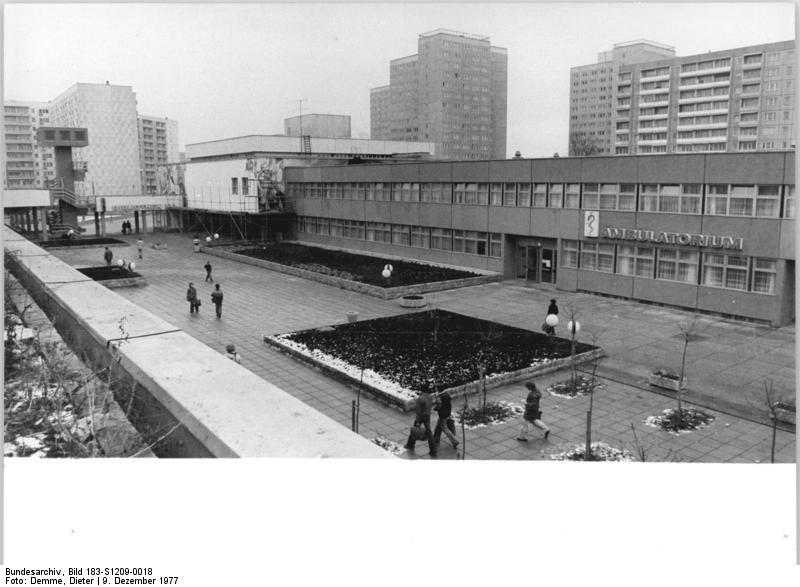
Ambulanz-Zentrum (1977).

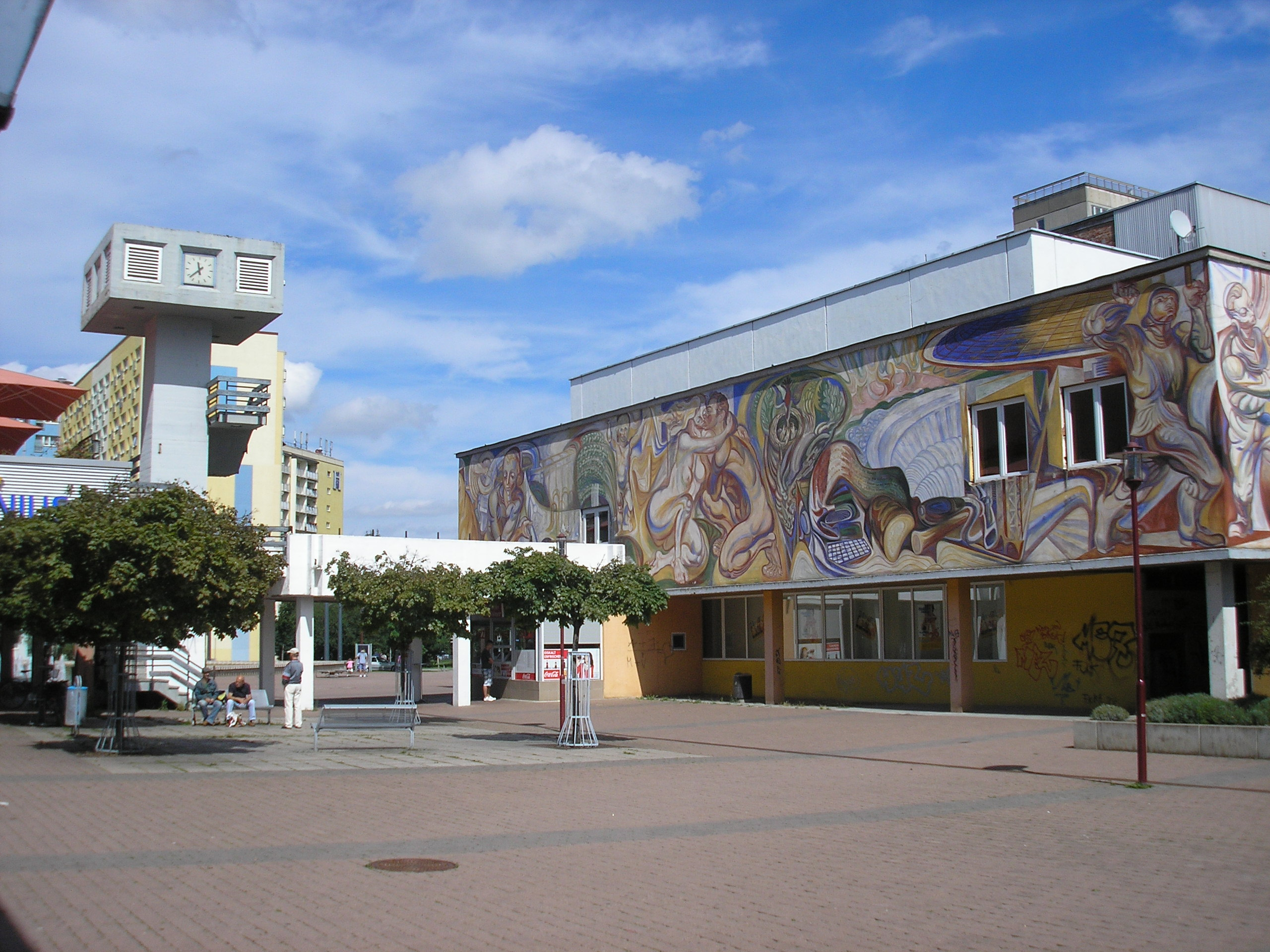
The front part of the square in 2010.

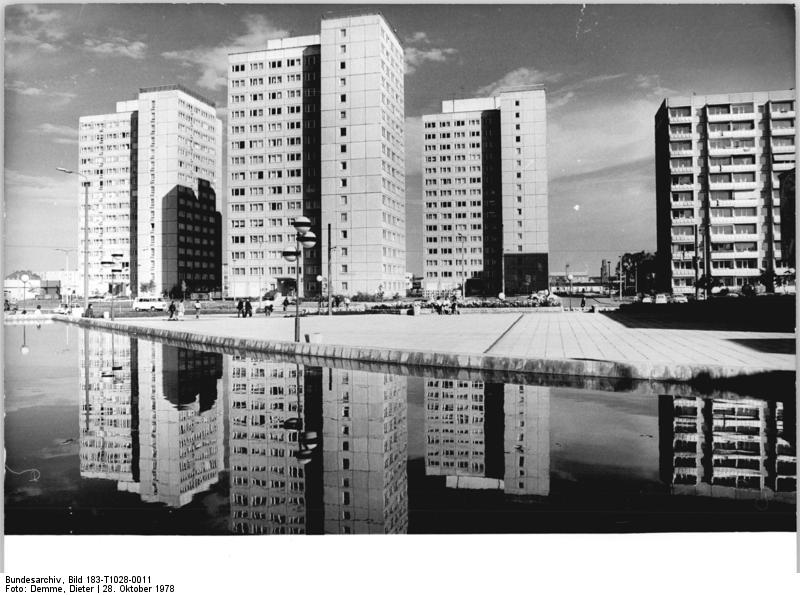
Straße der Völkerfreundschaft (1978).

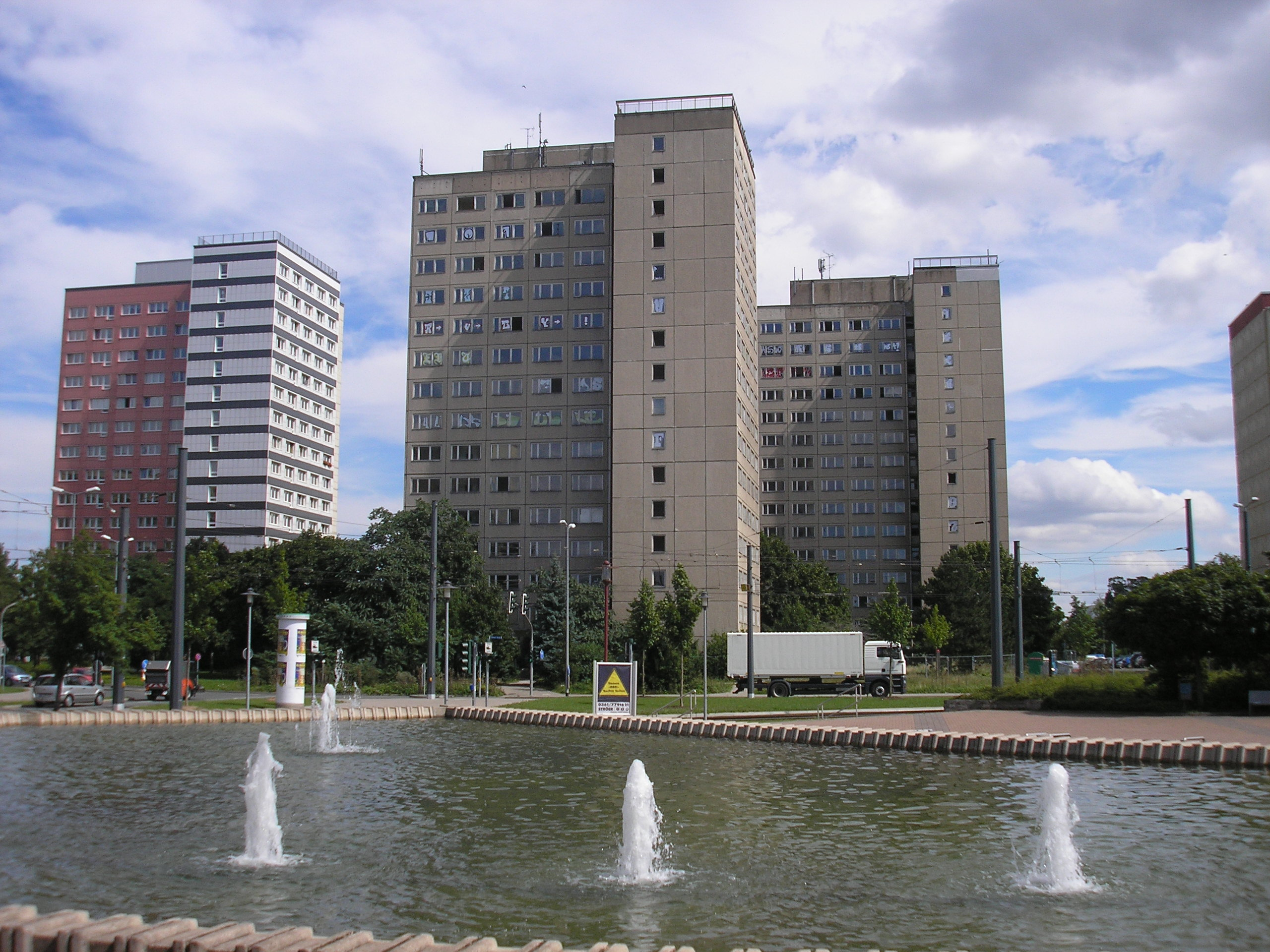
The same view, but in 2010.

The Rieth is a district in the north of the Thuringian state capital Erfurt, Germany.

Rieth is a prefabricated housing estate with 5650 inhabitants (as of 31 December 2012) on an area of 0.72 km^{2}, built in 1969. Before the fall of communism, however, considerably more people lived in this district. Neighbouring districts are Hohenwinden-Sulza (industrial area) in the east, Ilversgehofen (Gründerzeit district) in the south, Berliner Platz (prefabricated housing area) in the west, Moskauer Platz (prefabricated housing area) in the northwest, Gispersleben (village) in the north and Roter Berg (prefabricated housing area) in the northeast. The district is situated on the river Gera, its centre is the Platz der Völkerfreundschaft with the shopping centre Vilnius-Passagen. The adjoining district Berliner Platz is de facto regarded by many Erfurters as belonging to the Rieth and is often referred to as the Rieth.

The Rieth is connected to the Erfurt city centre by Erfurt Stadtbahn tram lines 1 and 6. The name Rieth frequently appears in Thuringia as a component of place names. These are river floodplains reclaimed in the Middle Ages, which had previously become marshy and had been drained. Today's Rieth district is also located in such a floodplain between the Gera River in the west and the river Schmale Gera in the east. The Rieth was the first GDR housing estate with a complex centre in its centre, but the Johannesplatz was the first prefabricated housing estate to be built in Erfurt in 1965.
