= Erfurt Stadtbahn =

Light rail system in Erfurt, Germany

Coordinates: 50.97597°N 11.03416°E

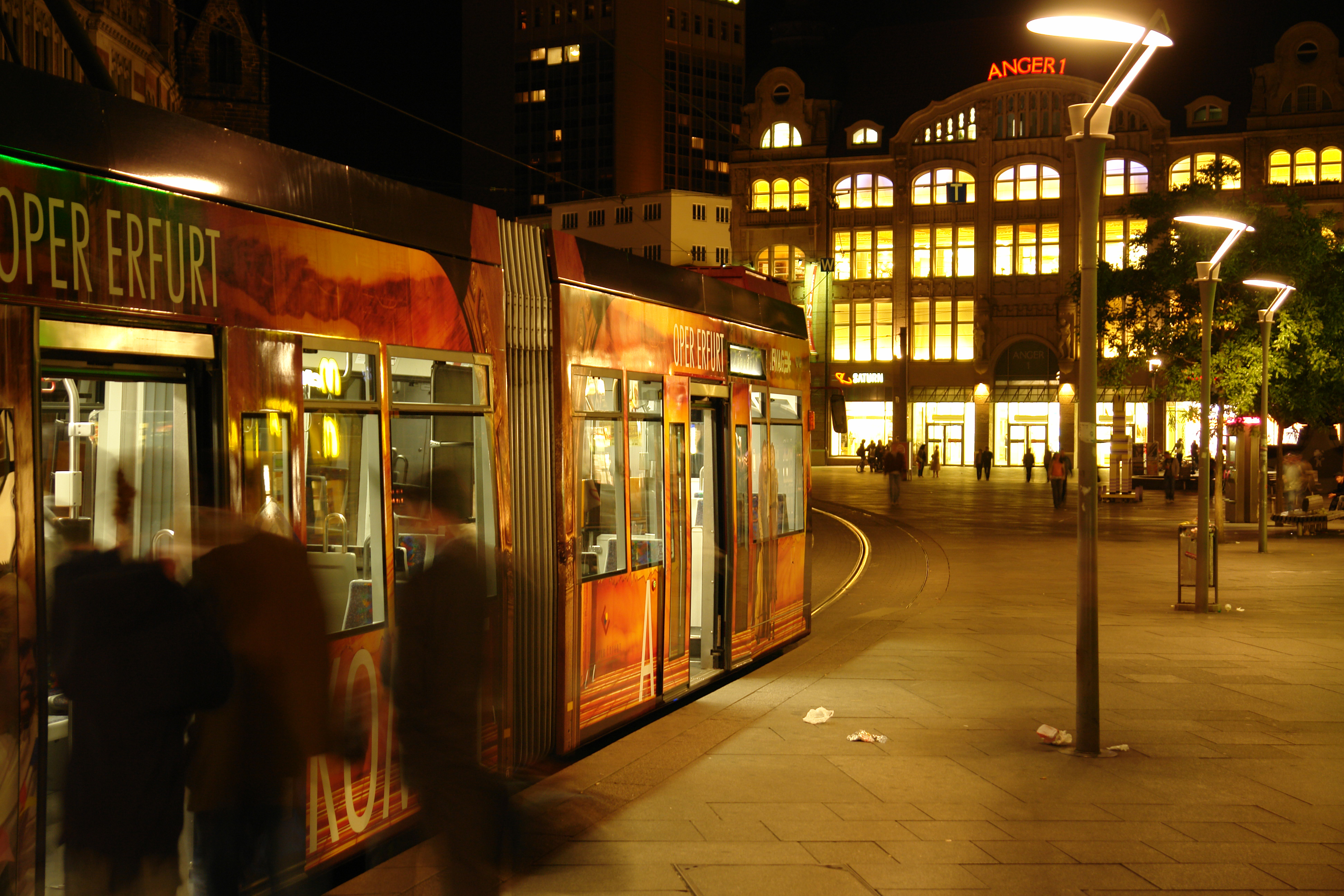
- Erfurt Stadtbahn at Anger station at night

Overview
- Locale: Erfurt, Thuringia, Germany
- Transit type: Tram
- Number of lines: 6
- Number of stations: 192
- Daily ridership: 114,885 (average, 2012)
- Annual ridership: 41.9 million (2012)
- Website: SWE EVAG

Operation
- Began operation: 1893 (as Tram); 1997 (as Stadtbahn)
- Operator: SWE EVAG
- Number of vehicles: 84

Technical
- System length: 45.2 km (28.1 mi)
- Track gauge: 1,000 mm (3 ft 3 3/8 in) (metre gauge)
System map
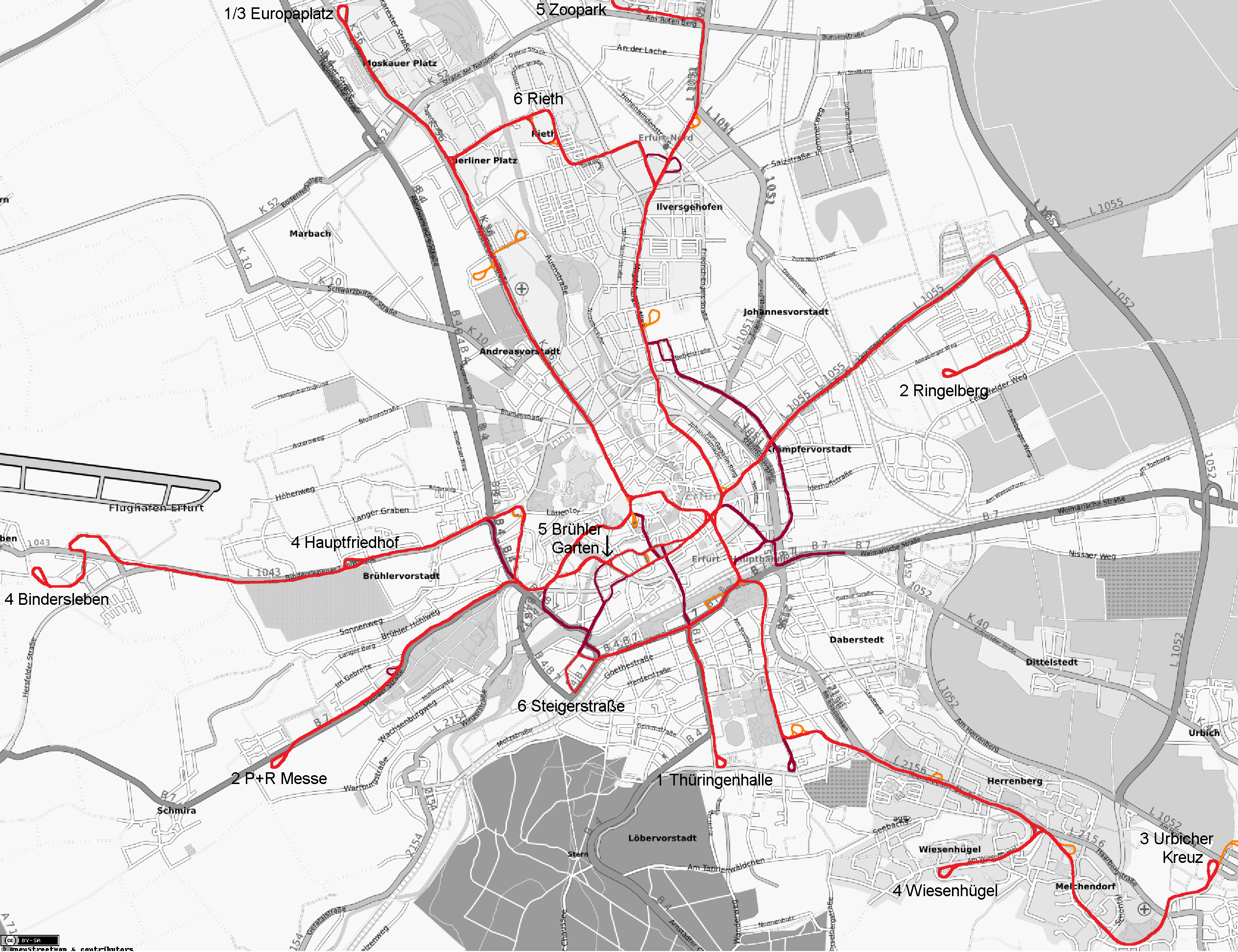
Erfurt Stadtbahn network (2009) with routes in regular service (red), operating routes (orange), and disused lines (dark red)

The Erfurt Stadtbahn is a light rail (German: Stadtbahn) network that is the basic public transit system of Erfurt, the capital of Thuringia in Germany. It represents the evolution of the city's original tramway which, outside of the city center, travels on track in its own right-of-way. The meter gauge network is made up of six lines, and has a total route length of 45.2 kilometers (28.1 mi), making it one of Germany's more moderate-sized Stadtbahn networks. The network is run by Stadtwerken Erfurter Verkehrsbetriebe AG (SWE EVAG), and is integrated in the Verkehrsverbund Mittelthüringen (VMT). The Stadtbahn carried 41.933 million passengers in 2012, which corresponds to about 114,885 passengers per day.

== Network ==
=== Lines ===
With the inauguration of the last extension of the system on 5 October 2007, a new six line daily-service Stadtbahn network, with 10-minute intervals on all lines during peak hours, came into operation.

Also included in the 10-minute interval service category is a single bus line, which therefore also received a one-digit line number – this is the Line 9 bus line, which runs from Daberstedt via Hauptbahnhof, Liebknechtstraße and Johannesplatz, to Nordbahnhof.

For events during the trade fair and during Christmas season, an additional Stadtbahn Line 7 operates over Anger and Domplatz to P+R Platz Messe.

Line	Route	Length (km)	Travel time (min)	Stations	Rolling stock
	Europaplatz^{1} ↔ Rieth ↔ Salinenstraße ↔ Anger ↔ Hauptbahnhof ↔ Thüringenhalle (/ Steigerstraße^{2})	9.4	29	22	**Combino**, Tramlink
	P+R Platz Messe ↔ egapark ↔ Domplatz Süd ↔ Anger ↔ Hauptbahnhof ↔ Wiesenhügel	9.2	24	20	**Combino**
	Europaplatz ↔ Universität ↔ Domplatz Nord ↔ Anger ↔ Hauptbahnhof ↔ Urbicher Kreuz	12.3	36	27	**Combino**, MGT6D, Tramlink
	Bindersleben^{3} ↔ Flughafen Erfurt^{3} ↔ Hauptfriedhof Erfurt (cemetery) ↔ Anger ↔ Hanseplatz/FH ↔ Ringelberg	12.8	39	28	**Combino**, Tramlink
	Zoopark ↔ Anger ↔ Hauptbahnhof^{4}	6.5	19	15	Combino, **Tramlink**
	Rieth ↔ Universität ↔ Domplatz Nord ↔ Anger ↔ Hauptbahnhof ↔ Steigerstraße (/ Thüringenhalle^{2})	7.4	25	17	**Combino**, MGT6D
**bold** = primarily operated vehicle type

^{1} Interim Rieth and Europeplatz only Monday through Saturday in daily service.

^{2} In the early evening and weekend traffic wrong line 1 towards Rieth from Steiger Street and south to Thüringenhalle Line 6, which moves in the direction Rieth from Thüringenhalle and south to Steigerstraße.

^{3} The section Bindersleben ↔ main cemetery is operated during the day with 20 to 30 minute intervals, with the normal in 10-minute intervals available only during peaks hours on weekdays; in the evenings, service is only every 40 minutes.

^{4} Individual trips are carried out instead of the main train station to the gardens Brühler 4 in early-day school transport.

== History ==
=== Erfurt's original tram network ===
By 1873, Erfurt was a fortress city, whose border was the city's walled fortifications from the 15th century. When the walls were torn down in the 1800s the city could expand and grow outward, leading to greater travel distances and the question of a public transport system arose. The first plans to build a tram system were developed from 1880 onwards, and were mainly driven by the then Mayor of Erfurt, Richard Wroclaw. On 13 May 1883, the first horsetram line was put into operation, run by the Erfurter Straßenbahn AG, and offering 5–20 minute headways. Soon, three tramlines were in operation, with the designations Red Line, Green Line, and Yellow Line.

By the early 1890s the population of Erfurt had grown from 55,000 to 76,000 residents, and horse-drawn trams could no longer meet the demands of the local populace. Plans to electrify the Erfurt tram system were undertaken in 1893. The first test drives on the electrified system were carried out on 28 May 1894, and the tram system was converted to electric current by 20 August 1894.

At this time the tram network was still mostly single track with some passing loops, which proved to be a huge obstacle to the further expansion of the tram system. So, starting in 1912, the gradual expansion of all Erfurt's tram routes to double track operation was undertaken. By 1913, tram routes to various suburbs (e.g. Hochheim and Melchendorf) did not seem to be financially viable, so a plan for a supplementary bus network was developed. However, its realization and the further expansion of the tram network were prevented by the outbreak of the First World War in 1914. During World War I, the tram network was used for the transport of troops, cargo and wounded (thus hospital cars were set up) to and from the Erfurt Hauptbahnhof, the hospital on the Nordhäuser Road, and the barracks on the southern edge of the city. A ride then cost just 15 Pfennig, a fare that remained valid until 1989 and Die Wende.

In 1920, the municipality of Erfurt took over the tram network. In the 1918–1922 period, some tram lines were cut, especially for the purposes of the demilitarization of those lines that had led to the barracks, but also those lines which had become unprofitable. Only in 1924 could new investments in the network be made, which led to a further doubling of the network by 1930 and the procurement of new tram vehicles. Also, in 1925, the first bus routes were opened for service. In 1930, tram lines, which had previously been identified by colors, were converted to a numbered lines system.

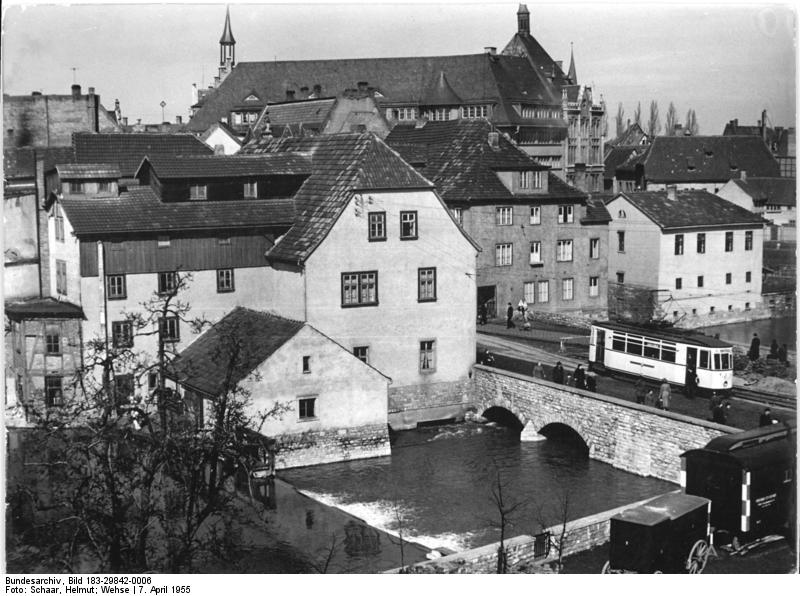
Erfurt, Hermann-Jahn-Straße (1955)

The tram network was damaged by artillery fire at the end of World War II in April 1945, and tram operations were temporarily suspended until 1946. However, electrical power was intermittent in the post-war period, through 1951, which affected tram operations and traffic.

Trolleybus operation was introduced in Erfurt in 1948, and operated conintinually until 1975. In 1951, the municipal VEB Erfurter Verkehrsbetriebe enterprise took over tram operations. Further, during the 1950s tram operations recovered and became increasingly profitable.

By the 1960s, trams everywhere, including in Erfurt, were increasingly perceived as slow and backward. This changed only with the general transport plans of the 1970s which brought a wave of modernization to Erfurt's tram system.

=== Modernization of Erfurt's tramway and the origins of the Stadtbahn ===
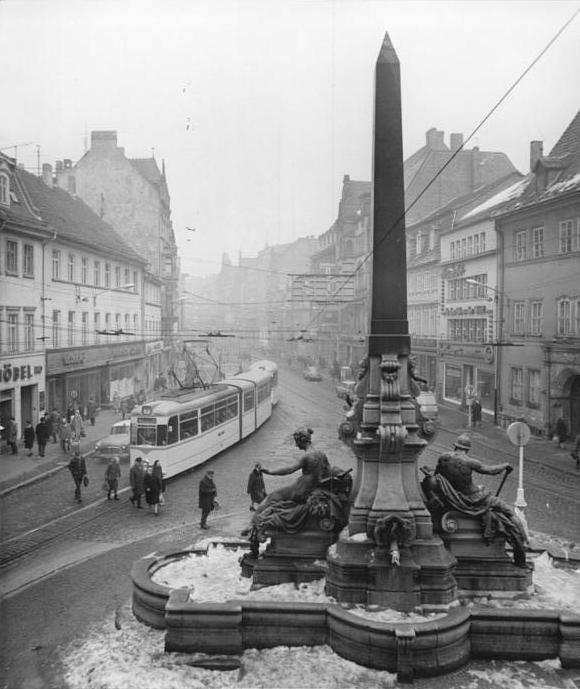
Erfurt, Anger, Anger fountain (1970)

A decisive development in the urbanization of Erfurt took place with the construction of residential areas Erfurt-Nord (50,000 inhabitants) and Erfurt-East (40,000 inhabitants) in the 1970s and 1980s. The result was that the city's transport needs had evolved considerably, whereupon Erfurter Verkehrsbetriebe had to respond. So old, narrow routes in the city center were shut down and separate new lines to the newly built residential areas were constructed. This was a first step in the direction of the development of Erfurt's modern Stadtbahn network, and included some routes that were fully grade-separated from other traffic (e.g. cars). Going hand-in-hand with the expansion of the network was the complete conversion of the railcar fleet. In 1975, the first Tatra KT4 traincars were introduced to replace the old Gotha cars in use at that time on the tramway, and through 1987 the old Gotha cars were removed from service.

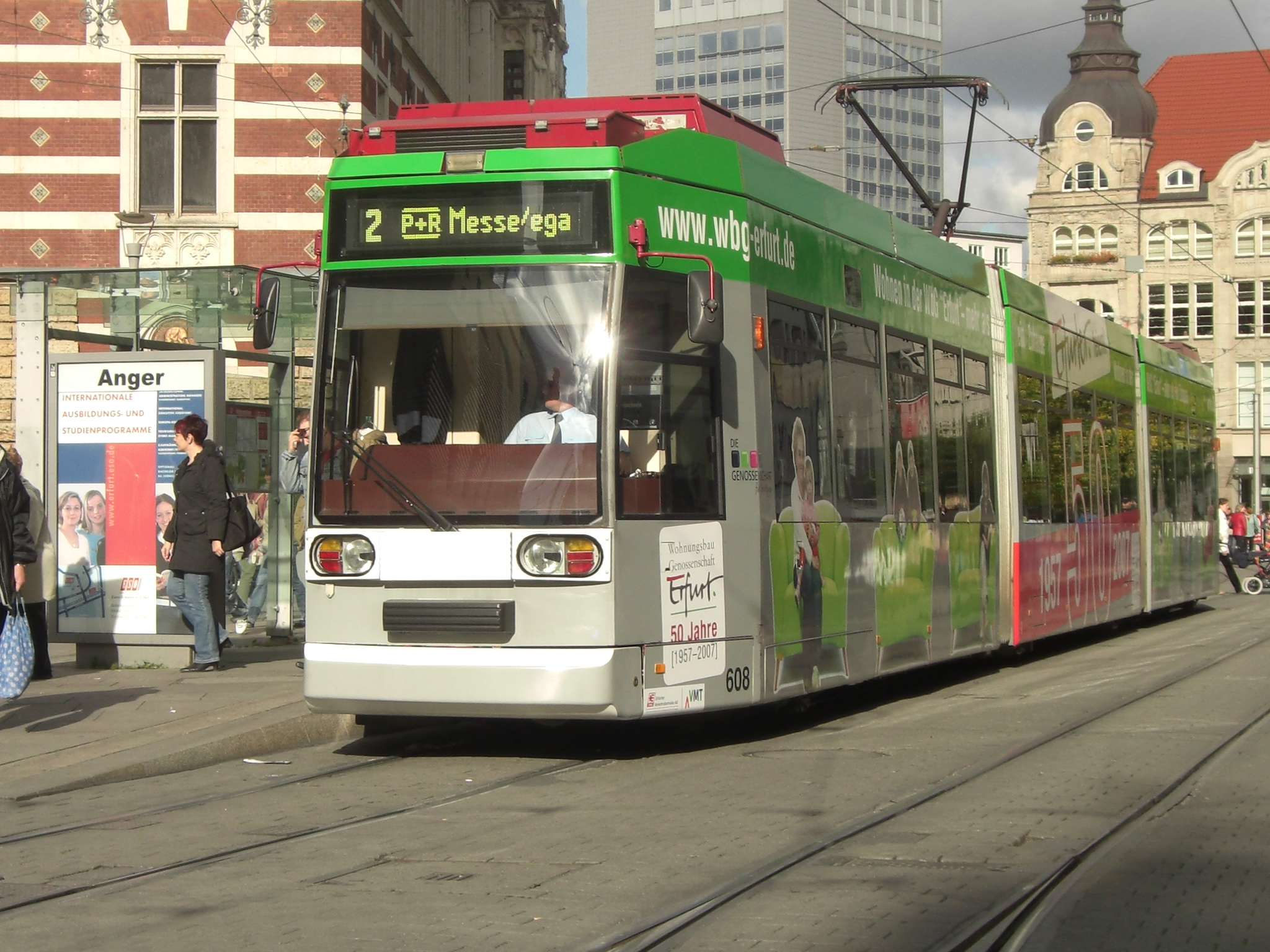
MGT6D(E) 608 tramcar at Anger (2009)

After German reunification in 1990, the previous VEB Erfurter Verkehrsbetriebe enterprise became the Erfurter Verkehrsbetriebe AG (EVAG), but it remained owned by the city. Since 1996, EVAG has been a division of the city's public utilities company (Stadtwerken), and since 2008 has been known as SWE EVAG. In the early 1990s, stops and passenger information systems were revitalized, and the fleet was modernized with the first low-floor MGT6D Duewag tramcars operating from 1994. In 2000, Combinos Siemens traincars were added to the fleet. Moreover, after 1990, fares were increased for the first time since 1914, from 15 Pfennig per trip to a level that allowed for a tram operation that was economically sustainable.

=== Development of the Erfurt Stadtbahn ===
In 1996, the Erfurt City Council decided on the extension of the tramway network, and its upgrading into a true "Stadtbahn" system. In this case, Stadtbahn, as opposed to tramway, means routes largely separated from other traffic, resulting in more efficient operation. The lines previously constructed during the 1970s and 1980s GDR era had already been built as grade-separated routes, so now almost all Erfurt routes could be operated in this manner.

The Erfurt system was officially christened as a Stadtbahn in 1997 with the conversion of the Anger crossing and the abandonment of the Magdeburger Allee depot.

In addition, the new city Stadtbahn plan included five new lines that would once again significantly increase the size of Erfurt's Stadtbahn network. Between 1997 and 2000, a Stadtbahn line was built from Anger on Leipziger Street to Ringelber in the east (Line 2). In 2000–2001, a gap in the network between Domplatz near the city center and the Gothaer Platz to the west was closed (Line 4), and tracks were extended from egapark in the west of the city to P+R Platz Messe (Line 2). From 2002 to 2005, tracks were extended from Hauptfriedhof Erfurt (cemetery) in the west of the city to Flughafen Erfurt (Erfurt–Weimar Airport) and Bindersleben (Line 4). The last new line opened in 2007, and served as a connection from Salinenstraße station (an der Magdeburger Allee) to Rieth (Line 1). As part of the Stadtbahn construction program, a network of six lines that run at 10-minute intervals was introduced. The bundling of several lines on the same route (e.g. in Erfurt city center between Hauptbahnhof and Domplatz) leads to even shorter headways on those sections.

A major snow storm in winter 2010 completely closed the network between Christmas Eve and 27 December 2010, and full service was not restored until 3 January 2011. Significant portions of the Stadtbahn network were closed between 11 March to 25 October 2013, as the route between Anger and Cathedral Square was not passable due to the redesign of the Fish Market and the rerouting of the Stadtbahn's castle route.

== Future service ==
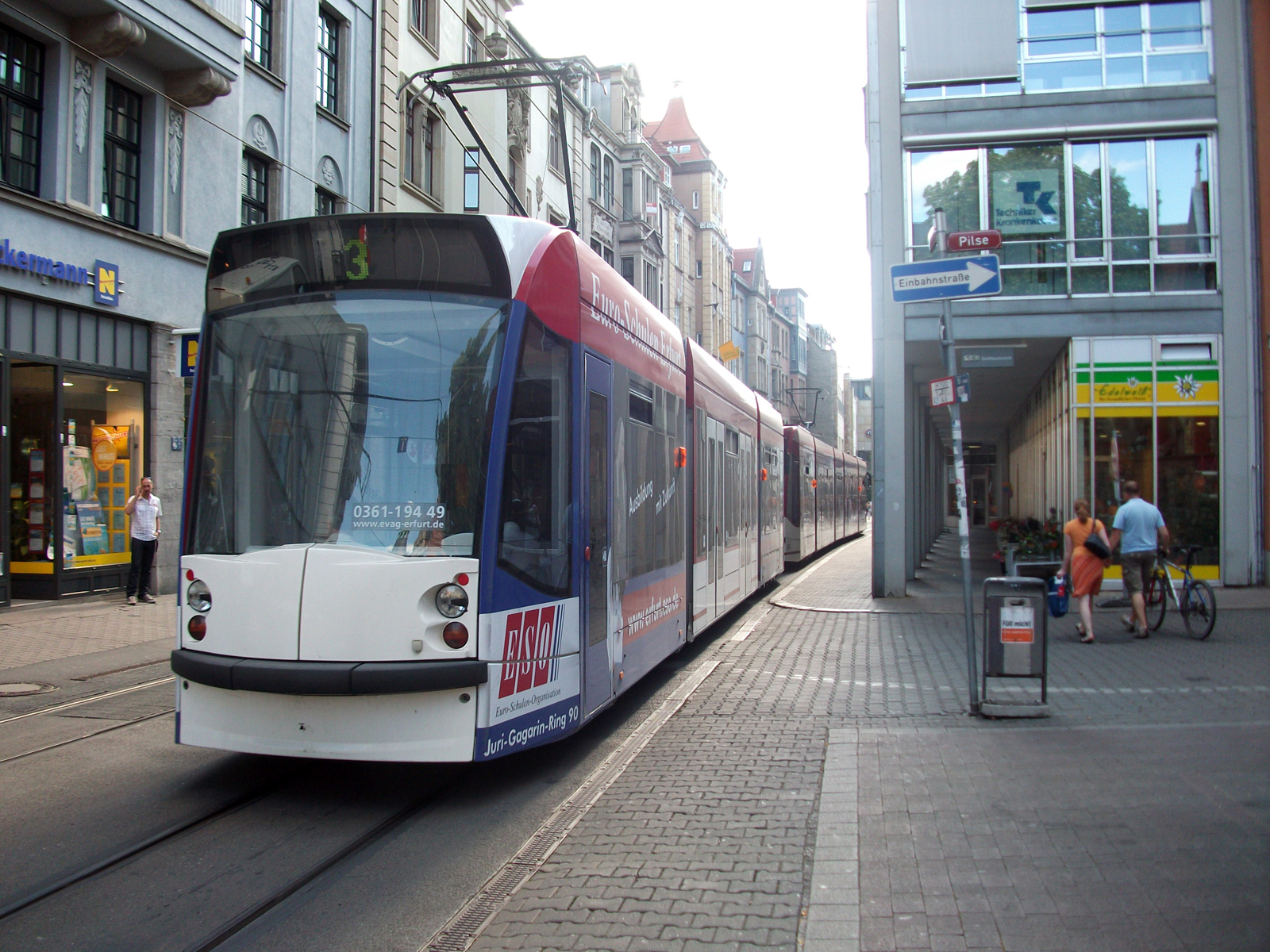
Combino Advanced 3-car train at Schlösserstraße (2010)

In the near future, the rail fleet will again be modernized, the Combino tramcars having already having been refurbished. In addition, twelve new three-car Combino trainsets were purchased. Furthermore, the route network will also be modernized. This will be done in the context of road upgrades in the relevant areas, as done with the 2008–2009 work in the Gotha court. In addition, the outer ends of the network will be fitted with electronic destination displays at all stop.

Additional new lines are not planned – the land-use plan for the city of Erfurt contains only a new extension from P+R Platz Messe to Schmira, which was originally included in the rail-building program, but which has not yet been realized. There are no concrete plans to build that extension currently. A new network plan is not expected until 2017, since the current alignments of light rail are approved until 31 March 2017.

It has been recommended in the coming years that 10-minute headways be extended to 18:30 at night on some sections of the network.
