= Mannheim Kurpfalzbrücke–Edingen–Heidelberg railway =

German railway line

Mannheim Kurpfalzbrücke–Heidelberg

Overview
- Line number: 669 (until 1970: 300g; until 1992: 568)
- Locale: Baden-Württemberg, Germany

Service
- Route number: 9402

Technical
- Number of tracks: 2
- Track gauge: 1,000 mm (3 ft 3 3/8 in) metre gauge
- Electrification: 750 V DC overhead catenary
- Operating speed: 80 km/h (50 mph)

The Mannheim Kurpfalzbrücke–Heidelberg railway is a metre-gauge railway between central Mannheim and Heidelberg-Bergheim. It was built by the former Oberrheinischen Eisenbahn-Gesellschaft AG (Upper Rhine Railway Company, OEG), later MVV OEG AG and is now operated by MVV Verkehr GmbH (infrastructure owner) and RNV (operations manager and train operator) according to Eisenbahn-Bau- und Betriebsordnung für Schmalspurbahnen (narrow-gauge railway regulations; ESBO). The route connects the Mannheim tram network with the Heidelberg tram network. However, the line is still owned by MVV Verkehr AG (the City of Mannheim's transport utility) as the successor to the OEG. It is operated as a branch line using electronic direct traffic control.

== History ==
=== The first years of operations ===
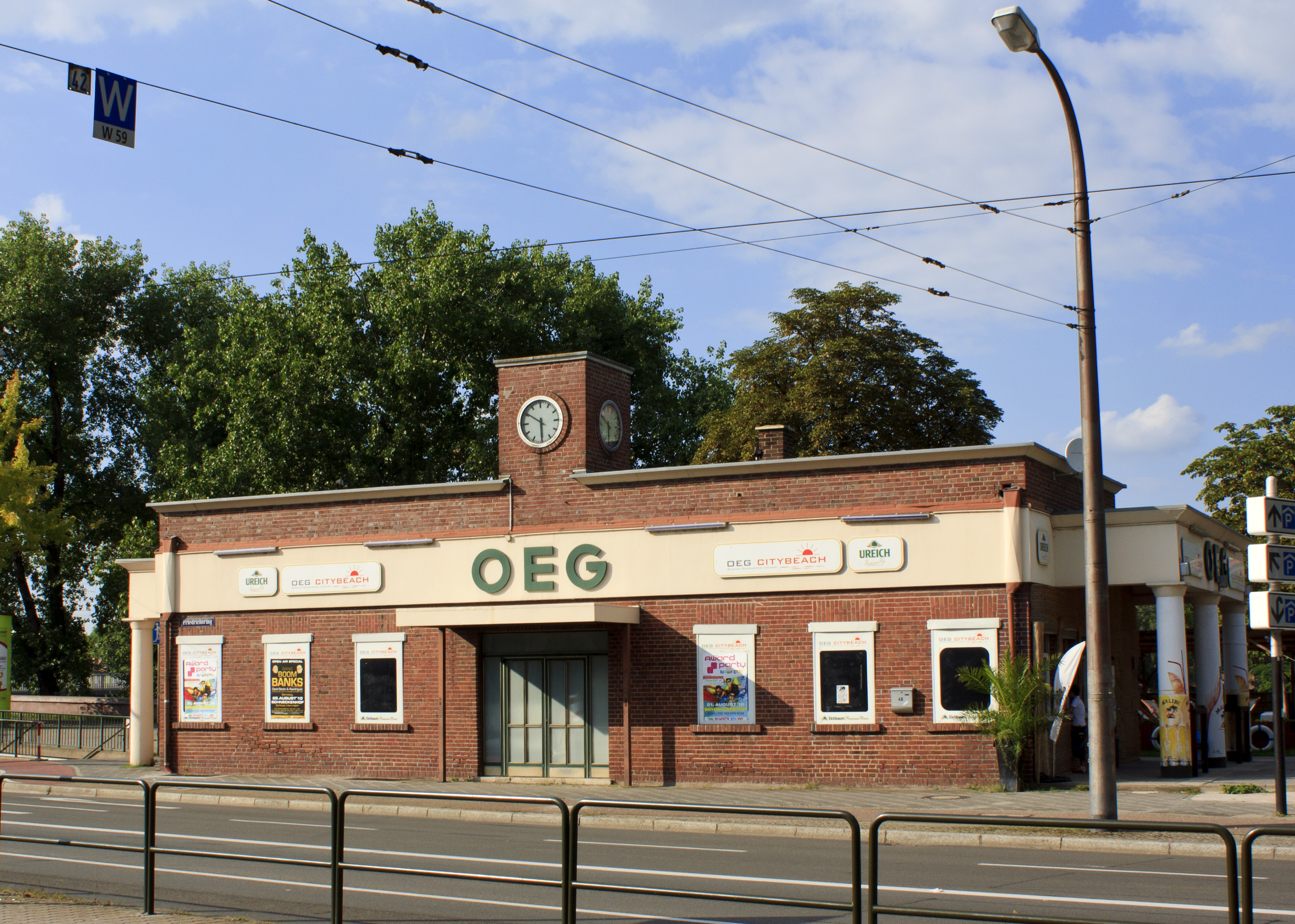
Mannheim Kurpfalzbrücke station, opened in 1891

Although Mannheim and Heidelberg were already connected by the Rhine Valley Railway since 1840, there were efforts in the 1880s to build a narrow-gauge railway between these cities in order to connect the smaller towns along the Neckar.

The Centralverwaltung für Secundärbahnen Herrmann Bachstein (Hermann Bachstein Branch Line Central Organisation), which had opened the Weinheim–Heidelberg railway along the Bergstraße ("Mountain Road") in 1890, opened the line from Heidelberg to Edingen on 6 June 1891 and opened the remaining section via Neckarhausen and Seckenheim to Mannheim on 13 July.

In 1892, the existing gap between the two OEG stations in Mannheim (the Weinheimer Bahnhof on the Mannheim–Weinheim railway north of the Neckar and Heidelberger Bahnhof south of the Neckar) was closed. However, this connection via the Friedrich bridge (now the Kurpfalz—"Palatinate"—bridge) was not used for public traffic.

=== Takeover by the SEG ===
The Bachstein company was absorbed into the South German Railway Company (Süddeutsche Eisenbahn-Gesellschaft AG, SEG), founded by Bachstein in 1895, which took over the operations of the Mannheim-Weinheim-Heidelberg-Mannheimer Eisenbahn (MWHME) in 1897.

The construction of a freight only railway line from the Heidelberg SEG freight yard over its own bridge over the Neckar and through the Neuenheimer Feld to Dossenheim and continuing to Schriesheim was opened on 16 July 1906 to provide a direct connection to the Schriesheimer and Dossenheimer quarries, meaning that freight trains no longer had to run through downtown Heidelberg. This line was dual gauge so it could be used by metre-gauge and standard-gauge traffic, with some stations and company sidings being built for standard gauge only.

The first changes to the route in Heidelberg occurred in 1913. Until then, the line had run from the OEG station through Bergheimer Straße and then turned into Karl-Metz-Straße. At the end of the street there were the tracks of the state railway, which ran west to Ochsenkopf. The line had to be relocated later for the relocation of Heidelberg Hauptbahnhof. After that it ran along Blücherstraße to Ochsenkopf. At the same time, the Heidelberg OEG freight yard was opened at the southern end of Karl-Metz-Straße and at the end of the goods line through the Neuenheimer Feld. The new works were opened on 10 August 1913.

The First World War delayed the first planned extension of the electrification. Eventually, in 1928, the Mannheim–Seckenheim–Neckarhausen–Edingen line was electrified and the line between Mannheim and Seckenheim was duplicated. A new station at the Kurpfalz bridge in Mannheim called Bahnhof Mannheim-Kurpfalzbrücke or Heidelberger Bahnhof (meaning the station for the line to Heidelberg) connected the tracks to the Mannheim tram network. Some of the OEG trains now ran on the Paradeplatz–Schloss–Bismarckstraße route to the forecourt of Mannheim Hauptbahnhof (with a link through Tattersallstrasse to Bismarckstraße), but this link was closed in 1943 after devastating Allied air raids.

A direct, double-track, electrified line was also built in 1928 between Seckenheim and Wieblingen south of Edingen; this was opened on 6 October 1929 and was about six kilometres shorter than the single-track line through Neckarhausen. The original Edingen–Wieblingen section along the country road was replaced by a two-track and electrified line on a new alignment on 28 October 1928; the Wieblingen–Heidelberg section was simultaneously double-tracked and electrified. At the same time, Edingen (Baden) station was relocated to its present location and a new wagon hall was built.

Joint operations with the Heidelberg Tramway (HSB) started in 1929.

=== After the Second World War ===
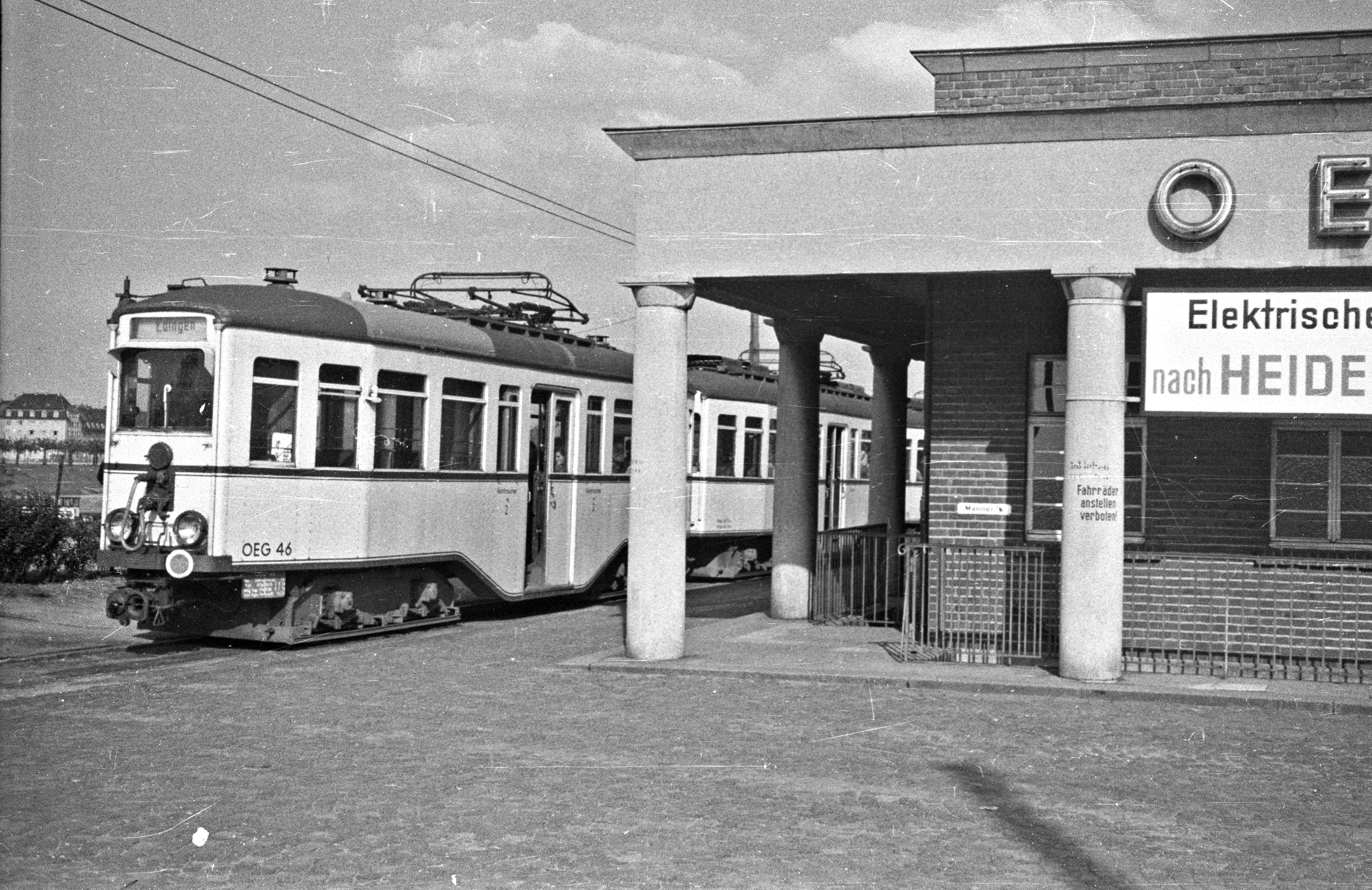
OEG station near the Kurpfalz Bridge in the 1950s

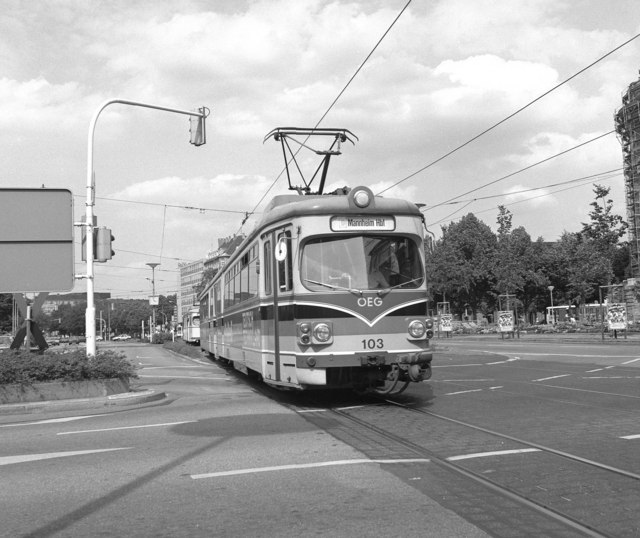
OEG train on the Mannheim Friedrichsring (1986)

In 1960, the local signal boxes began to be replaced by an automatic block signaling system. The first line to be modernised was from Mannheim to Seckenheim. In 1967, the Schriesheim–Handschuhsheim section was re-signalled. Today, the line is controlled by Edingen signal box.

Because the Seckenheim–Neckarhausen–Edingen line was lightly used because of the direct line that was opened in 1928/29, it was replaced by a bus route in 1969. The kilometre stones on the Neckar river embankment in Neckarhausen are still visible today.

The halt of Neu-Edingen was opened on 10 April 1989.

After planning began in 1983, the OEG opened a new route in Heidelberg in 1993: instead of using Bergheimer Straße, it now runs on the tram line along Kurfürstenanlage to Heidelberg Hauptbahnhof. This required a new track to be built from the direction of Wieblingen, starting shortly before the former OEG freight yard, which was partially demolished at the same time, passing under the Czerny bridge to the Hauptbahnhof and connecting with the existing tram route.

The Berufsschule – Alter Güterbahnhof section was closed on Friday, 7 May 1993. On the following Sunday night, the Güterbahnhof–Blücherstraße section was closed and the Berufsschule–Hauptbahnhof section was opened, running towards the Hauptbahnhof only. The Blücherstraße–Berufsschule section was closed on the next Friday and the Hauptbahnhof–Berufsschule section was opened on the following Monday, 17 May. A development on the site of the freight yard was completed on 17 August 1998.

In 1995, the concept of MVG 2000 was implemented that also brought big changes for the OEG. Up to this time, trains coming from Weinheim terminated in the forecourt of the Mannheim Hauptbahnhof and from Heidelberg in Mannheim Kurpfalz Bridge station (Bahnhof Mannheim Kurpfalzbrücke). The circuit was now closed with trains running through the centre of Mannheim. To achieve this, a short connecting line was built from the front of the Collini-Center, bypassing the Kurpfalz bridge station branch and connecting to the tram line on Friedrichsring. This connection was a restoration; there had been a similar link until 1928 or 1974. The OEG was connected to the Mannheim tram network and now ran with the line designation of 5R (and 5 for trains running only on the Käfertal–Mannheim–Edingen section).

The connection of the OEG to Deutsche Bahn's two main stations in Mannheim and Heidelberg thus took place within a few years of each other.

As a result of the upgrade, the OEG was integrated into the Heidelberg tram network as a full line from June 1999.

However, the Heidelberg stop of Adenauerplatz between Bismarckplatz and Poststraße was not served by the OEG due to the short distance to the neighbouring stops before it was abolished in 2015.

=== Transition to the RNV and modernisation from 2005 ===
Since the unification of the line names in the RNV area on 10 December 2006, the OEG has used the designation 5 for the entire route.

The whole signal infrastructure and signalling operations has been renewed since 2010. The entire line has been equipped with the "Ks" signalling system (Ks-Signalsystem, a new colour light signals system being introduced in Germany) since the spring of 2014. A control centre covering the entire traffic area of Rhein-Neckar-Verkehr GmbH was built in the Möhlstraße depot in Mannheim. The adaption of equipment for computer-based interlocking technology also takes place here. Control of the Edingen signal box was transferred to the central control centre on 10 March 2011, so this station along with Schriesheim is now unstaffed.

== Operating points ==
Renaming
Formerly	Now	Date
Schlachthaus	Mittermaierstraße	between 1934 and 1944?
Lessingschule	Lessingstraße	
Friedrichsbrücke	Kurpfalzbrücke	
Mittermaierstraße	Betriebshof	
Wieblingen Süd	Fachhochschule	2005
Mühlfeld	Berufsakademie	2006
Berufsakademie	Duale Hochschule	June 2009
Wieblingen OEG-Bahnhof	Wieblingen Mitte	June 2010
Fachhochschule	SRH Campus	December 2016

== Operations ==
Originally passenger traffic on the line was operated as one of four independently operated OEG lines and was referred to as line B. The carriage shed was in Edingen.

After electrification in 1929, express trains ran from Heidelberg Bismarckplatz to Mannheim Hbf in 43 minutes.

There were hourly long-distance trains running non-stop between Kurpfalzbrücke and Bismarckplatz, hourly express trains stopping in Neuostheim, Seckenheim Rathaus, Edingen and Wieblingen, as well as trains running via Neckarhausen stopping at all stations. On Sundays and public holidays, there were additional express trains in the early afternoon and evening, producing a quarter-hourly cycle.

Trains in Mannheim ended at the OEG station and no longer ran into the city centre from 6 September 1943 as a result of wartime bombing raids. Operations stopped due to the war from 26 March. Services first resumed from Seckenheim to Neckarhausen and directly via Edingen to Heidelberg on 1 July. The Neuostheim–Seckenheim section followed on 15 July, the Lessingschule–Neuostheim and Neckarhausen–Edingen sections on 12 November and the last section to Kurpfalz bridge on 23 May 1946.

A 20-minute regular service was introduced on the line on 1 April 1946.

Trains ran every 24 minutes from 2 June 1957.

It was the last OEG line to lose the first class section of its carriages on 26 May 1963. At the same time, the express trains were abolished and afterwards only one express train ran each morning from Heidelberg to Mannheim.

A common fare system with Heidelberg trams was introduced in 1974.

After the completion of electrification of the OEG Mannheim–Heidelberg–Weinheim–Mannheim triangular route in 1956, the two train services running to Weinheim were joined, with every second train continuing to Heidelberg, creating so-called "round trip" services. Normal train services were also joined in Heidelberg from 30 May 1965, so that all trains now ran on round trips except for additional peak-hour services. A round trip took 122 minutes. Thus, the two services on the line were:

- A: Mannheim – Käfertal – Weinheim – Heidelberg – Seckenheim – Kurpfalzbrücke and
- B: Kurpfalzbrücke – Seckenheim.

Half-hourly services were introduced on 25 September 1966. On the Neckarhäusen line, trains ran every hour from Seckenheim, continuing to Mannheim Kurpfalzbrücke. Between Mannheim Kurpfalzbrücke and Seckenheim there were additional trains, so that on this section there were services every quarter of an hour. It led to considerable delays until 20 October because of the short turnaround of only 6 minutes in Mannheim Kurpfalzbrücke. As a result, the cycles were changed on 23 October and the turnaround time in Mannheim Kurpfalzbrücke was extended to 21 minutes.

A reduced timetable with less regular intervals was operated from 1 July 1971 to 31 June 1973. Afterwards, the operation of regular-interval trains every half hour was restored, with 20-minute intervals in the peak hours. Between Kurpfalzbrücke and Seckenheim in the peak, trains ran at alternative intervals of 5/8/7 minutes (from 18 September 1975 in a 13/7 minute cycle only). This also meant that no trains were scheduled to stop at Bismarckplatz, previously it was only served by a morning train.

On 23 May 1993, another half-hourly cycle was introduced and between Kurpfalzbrücke and Seckenheim there were additional trains. The top speed was increased from 60 km/h to 80 km/h.

In 1995, the Weinheim and Heidelberg train services were also joined in Mannheim. So OEG trains have circulated around the circuit since then, except for trains that reverse in Edingen/Schriesheim or Käfertal/Weinheim. Trains running the entire circuit were initially designated as line 62 and services between Käfertal and Edingen 63, as the VRN envisaged adopting a network-wide naming scheme. However, since the MVV used the designation 5 for the OEG service running within Mannheim on its light rail network, the VRN eventually used the designation 5^{R} (instead of 62) for trains running on the whole circuit and 5 (instead of 63) for the short services between Käfertal and Edingen. Line 5^{R} ran on a 20-minute cycle (every half hour on weekends), between Edingen and Käfertal services ran every 10 minutes, taking into account line 5 services (every 15 minutes on Sundays). In the VRN's timetable book, however, the timetable was listed in table "R 65". The distinction between 5 (for the trains running only between Käfertal and Edingen) and 5R was finally abandoned at the end of 2006 and since then only the designation 5 has been used. This designation is now also used in the timetable book.

OEG trains between Mannheim and Neuostheim were diverted over the tram line on Seckenheimer Straße, Theodor-Heuss-Anlage and Dürerstraße for the first time from 30 October to 3 November 2000.

On 27 April 2008, the RNV Express was introduced, which runs on Sundays from Bad Dürkheim to Heidelberg, stopping at only the most important intermediate stops, taking 80 minutes. Since June 2016, it has been operated as line 9, running together with RHB express trains.

The OEG circuit describes an "8" with an intersection in the city of Mannheim on the left bank of the Neckar (at the Friedrich-Ebert-bridge). It is not possible to change at this barely perceptible intersection.

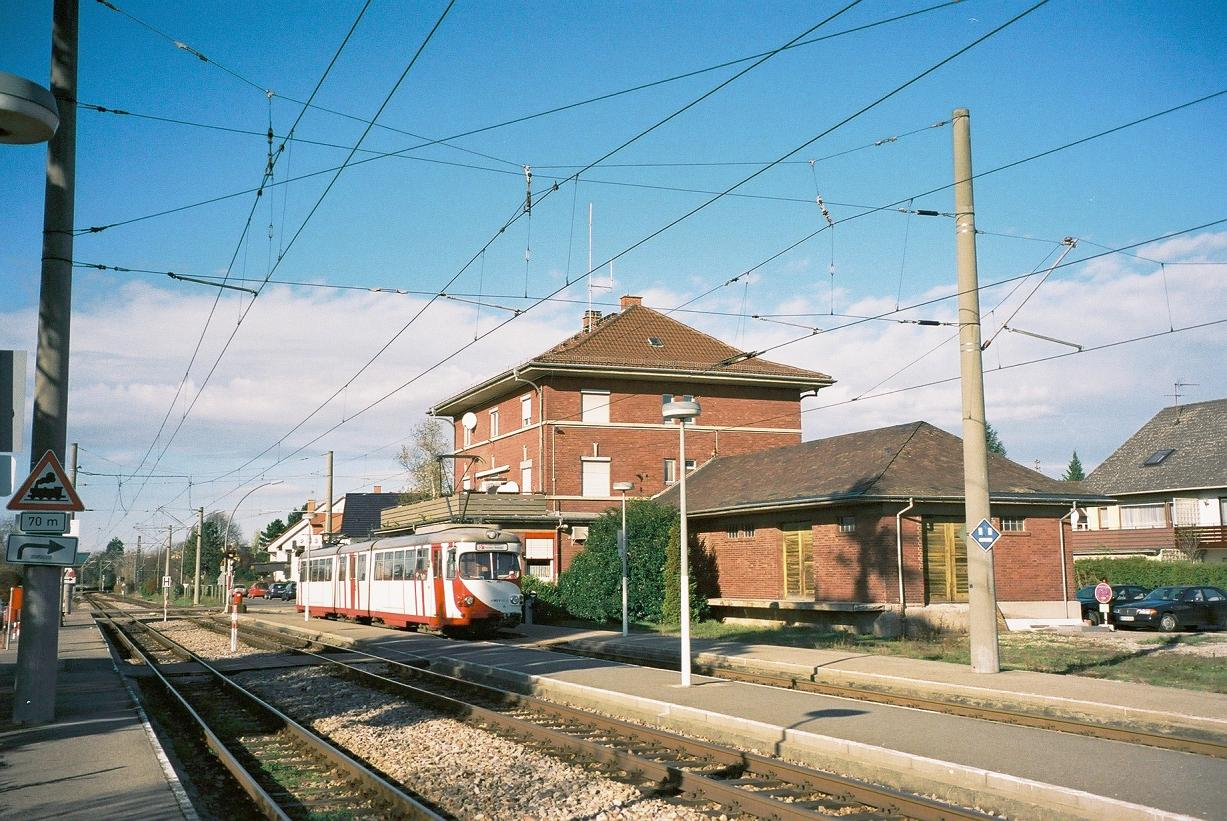
Edingen (Baden) station

The operation of services on the complete circuit creates a need for high reliability and punctuality. The OEG does not have overtaking tracks in Mannheim or in Heidelberg. It also has no recovery time in the timetable in the cities, because this would disrupt tram traffic. At times, for example, there were considerable irregularities in the OEG services: delays of ten minutes or more were frequent at certain times of the day. Scheduled connections were often not met. The OEG timetable has therefore contained more recovery time in Schriesheim, Edingen and Käfertal since 12 June 2005.

The line is served exclusively by bi-directional vehicles, which have driver's cabs at both ends of the set and thus do not require turning loops. Line 5 is the only line in Mannheim which requires such vehicles, while the Heidelberg tramway has only used bi-directional vehicles since 1974.
