= Weinheim–Heidelberg railway =

German metre-gauge railway

Weinheim–Heidelberg

Overview
- Line number: 669 (until 1970: 300g; until 1992: 568)
- Locale: Baden-Württemberg, Germany

Service
- Route number: 9401

Technical
- Line length: 16.3 km (10.1 mi)
- Number of tracks: 2
- Track gauge: 1,000 mm (3 ft 3 3/8 in) metre gauge
- Minimum radius: 23 m (75 ft)
- Electrification: 750 V DC overhead catenary
- Operating speed: 80 km/h (50 mph)

The Weinheim–Heidelberg railway is a metre-gauge railway between Weinheim and Heidelberg in the German state of Baden-Württemberg. It was built by the former Oberrheinischen Eisenbahn-Gesellschaft AG (Upper Rhine Railway Company, OEG), later MVV OEG AG and is now operated by MVV Verkehr GmbH (infrastructure owner) and RNV (operations manager and train operator) according to Eisenbahn-Bau- und Betriebsordnung für Schmalspurbahnen (narrow-gauge railway regulations; ESBO). A short dual gauge section between Heidelberg and Schriesheim was formerly operated to carry standard gauge freight. It is operated as a branch line using electronic direct traffic control.

== History ==
=== Construction and opening ===
Although Weinheim and Heidelberg were already connected by the Main-Neckar Railway since 1846, there were efforts in the 1880s to build a narrow-gauge railway between these cities in order to connect the smaller towns along the Bergstraße (mountain road) with a railway. In particular, the operators of the quarries in Schriesheim and Dossenheim wanted a rail connection, since the Main-Neckar Railway ran some distance from them.

In 1883, the Leferenz brothers who were active as entrepreneurs in the region, were granted a concession for the route from Heidelberg to Schriesheim with an extension to Weinheim. For financial reasons, however, this could not be realised for the time being.

=== The first years of operation ===
The Centralverwaltung für Secundärbahnen Herrmann Bachstein (Hermann Bachstein Branch Line Central Organisation) acquired the concession for the Mannheim–Weinheim railway from the Leferenz brothers and opened the line from Weinheim along the Bergstraße ("Mountain Road") via Lützelsachsen, Hohensachsen, Großsachsen, Leutershausen, Schriesheim, Dossenheim and Handschuhsheim to Heidelberg in 1890.

The Bachstein company was absorbed into the South German Railway Company (Süddeutsche Eisenbahn-Gesellschaft AG, SEG), founded in 1895, which took over the operations of the Mannheim-Weinheim-Heidelberg-Mannheimer Eisenbahn (MWHME) in 1897.

To provide a direct connection to the Schriesheimer and Dossenheimer quarries, the construction of a freight only railway line from the Heidelberg SEG freight yard over its own bridge over the Neckar and through the Neuenheimer Feld to Dossenheim and continuing to Schriesheim was approved on 14 August 1903. In July 1904, with the construction of 230 m long three-arched bridge over the Neckar designated as the Schwarze Brücke (Black Bridge) by Maschinenbau Anstalt Humboldt began. After its completion was delayed by an accident, the line was opened on 16 July 1906, so that freight trains no longer had to run through downtown Heidelberg. This line was dual gauge so it could be used by metre-gauge and standard-gauge traffic, with some stations and company sidings being built for standard gauge only. For a period in 1924, the track on the Neckar bridge was laid with four rails, since it was also used by a 900 mm gauge temporary construction railway for the building of the Schwabenheim Neckar canal and the reconstruction of Mannheimer Straße. This work included the extension of the Neckar bridge by a fourth span and its raising by 2.40 m. This meant that the bridge now passed over the road to Wieblingen, which had previously run over a level crossing. Just south of the Neckar bridge, the mixed-gauge track separated into a standard-gauge and a metre-gauge track. The bridge was blown up by German troops during the Second World War on 27 March 1945.

=== The OEG era ===
In 1913, the OEG Heidelberg freight yard was relocated from the southern end of Karl-Metz-Straße to the long-standing location at the end of the freight line through Neuenheimer Feld.

Joint operations with the Heidelberg Tramway (HSB) started in 1929. The last scheduled steam trains between Heidelberg and Handschuhsheim ran on 5 October.

The line between Handschuhsheim and Dossenheim was laid on a new track separated from the road in 1941.

The Black Bridge, which was blown up at the end of the Second World War in 1945, was rebuilt as a temporary bridge and the operation of the freight railway resumed in April 1947.

After being delayed by the war, the planned electrification of the OED lines was completed with the last section being the Weinheim–Heidelberg line, which was electrified between 1949 and 1956 in several sections. Electrification on the section from Handschuhsheim to Dossenheim was completed on 18 December 1949, which involved the electrification of the freight line through Neuenheimer Feld so power could be supplied from Seckenheim. Electrical operations commenced on the Dossenheim–Schriesheim section on 15 December 1950. The section from Schriesheim to Weinheim was completed on 1 September 1956, allowing the continuous operation of trains around the circuit to be resumed with electric railcars.

After the Second World War, the route network was partly out of date. The not yet electrified, single-track line along the Bergstraße from Handschuhsheim to Weinheim was still in its original condition. It ran on the edge of federal highway 3 and therefore had a high accident rate. Therefore, it was relaid on a separate track from 1952 to 1955, although the section through the narrow passage through the centre of Großsachsen still runs on the road. The carriage shed in Schriesheim was completed in 1952; at that time it housed not only buses but also rail rolling stock (until 1969).

The concession for the operation of the railway was extended in 1959. This was granted on a temporary basis because there were appeals against its continued operation. Eventually the concession was reissued in 1964 for passenger operations until 2009 and for freight until 1989.

Duplication of the line from the junction with the HSB line at Steubenstrasse in Handschuhsheim to the municipal limits in Dossenheim was completed on 30 June 1963. Up to then the line had been served by line 6 of the Heidelberg Tramway.

The Schriesheim–Handschuhsheim section was resignalled with automatic block signaling in 1967. Resignalling of the whole line from Weinheim to Heidelberg was completed in 1969. Over the next few years, the line came under the control of a signal box in Schriesheim.

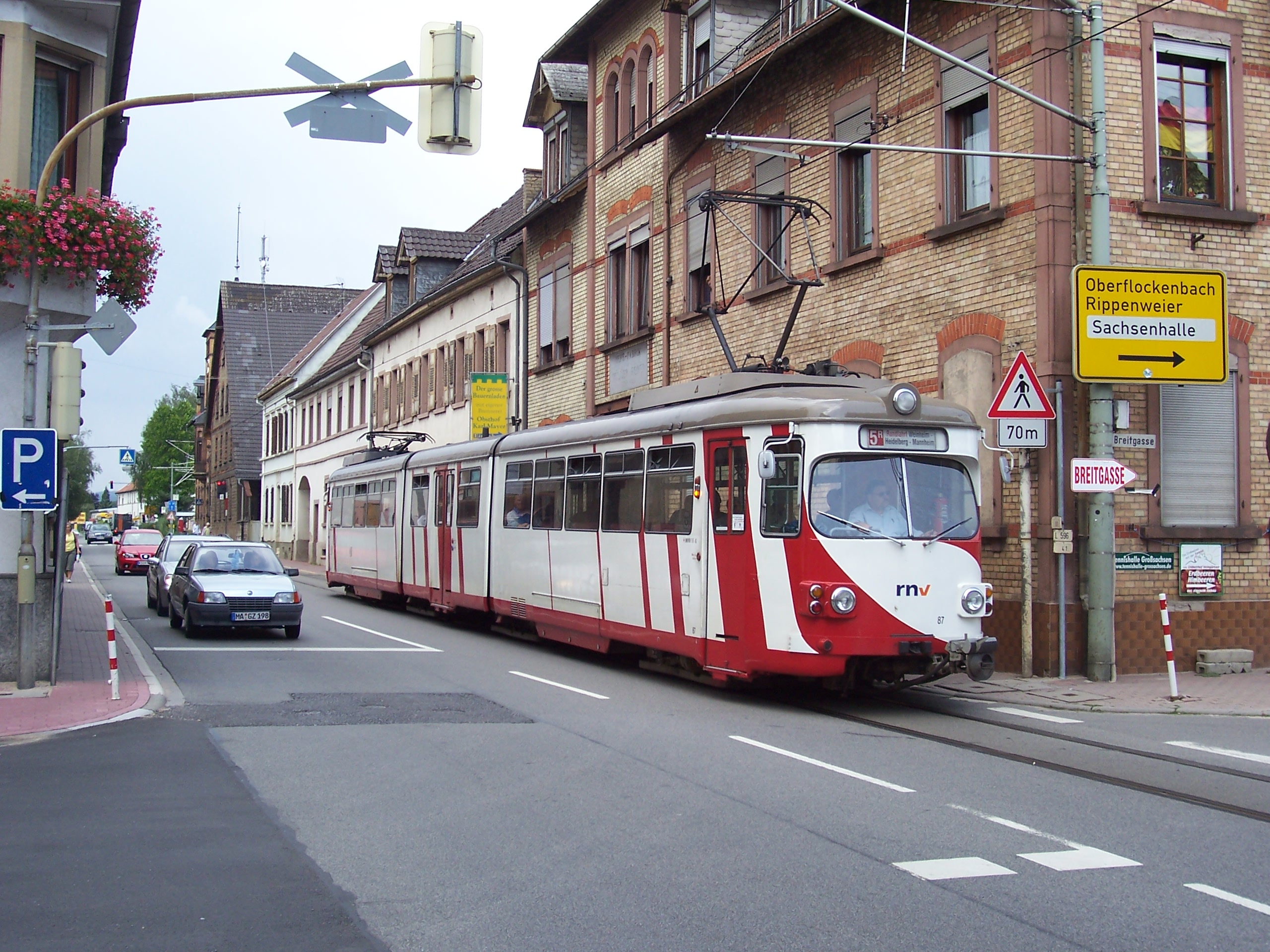
Single track in Großsachsen

In the 1960s, continuously welded rail began to be installed. The remaining semaphore signals were replaced by colour light signals, which are easier to maintain.

Because of growing competition from road transport for freight, profitability fell significantly in the 1960s, so that the closure of the dual gauge freight line between Heidelberg and Schriesheim was sought on 12 December 1969, approved on 19 January 1970 and closed on 1 July 1970. The carriage of general freight was abandoned by 1971. The Black Bridge was demolished from October 1970 to June 1971. An exception was the annual sugar beet harvest, which was transported using Rollbocks, which operated until 1983. Otherwise, the OEG operated freight traffic until the early 1990s using road transport.

=== Further modernisation ===
In 1980, Schriesheim OEG station was adapted for the needs of the time and upgraded and the local carriage shed was converted into a central bus depot.

In 1995, the concept of MVG 2000 was implemented that also brought significant changes for the OEG. Up to this time, trains coming from Weinheim terminated in the forecourt of Mannheim Hauptbahnhof and from Heidelberg in Mannheim Kurpfalzbrücke (Kurpfalz bridge) station. The circuit was then completed with trains running through the centre of Mannheim. To achieve this, a short connecting line was built from the front of Collini-Center, bypassing Kurpfalzbrücke station junction and connecting to the tram line on Friedrichsring. This connection was a restoration; there had been a similar link until 1928 or 1974. The OEG was connected to the Mannheim tram network and now ran with the line designation of 5R (and 5 for trains running only on the Käfertal–Mannheim–Edingen section). In the 1990s, the Heidelberg–Schriesheim section was duplicated to allow denser regular-interval traffic. The Handschuhsheim Nord–Dossenheim section has been double-track since 28 February 1999. The second track was completed in the spring of 1999 and was the only one used while the old track was renewed. Two-track operations started and the two new halts of Dossenheim Nord and Schriesheim Süd were commissioned on 12 June 1999. The duplication of the remaining section of the line between Schriesheim and Weinheim was carried out from March 2011 with a seven-month closure of the line with trains replaced by buses.

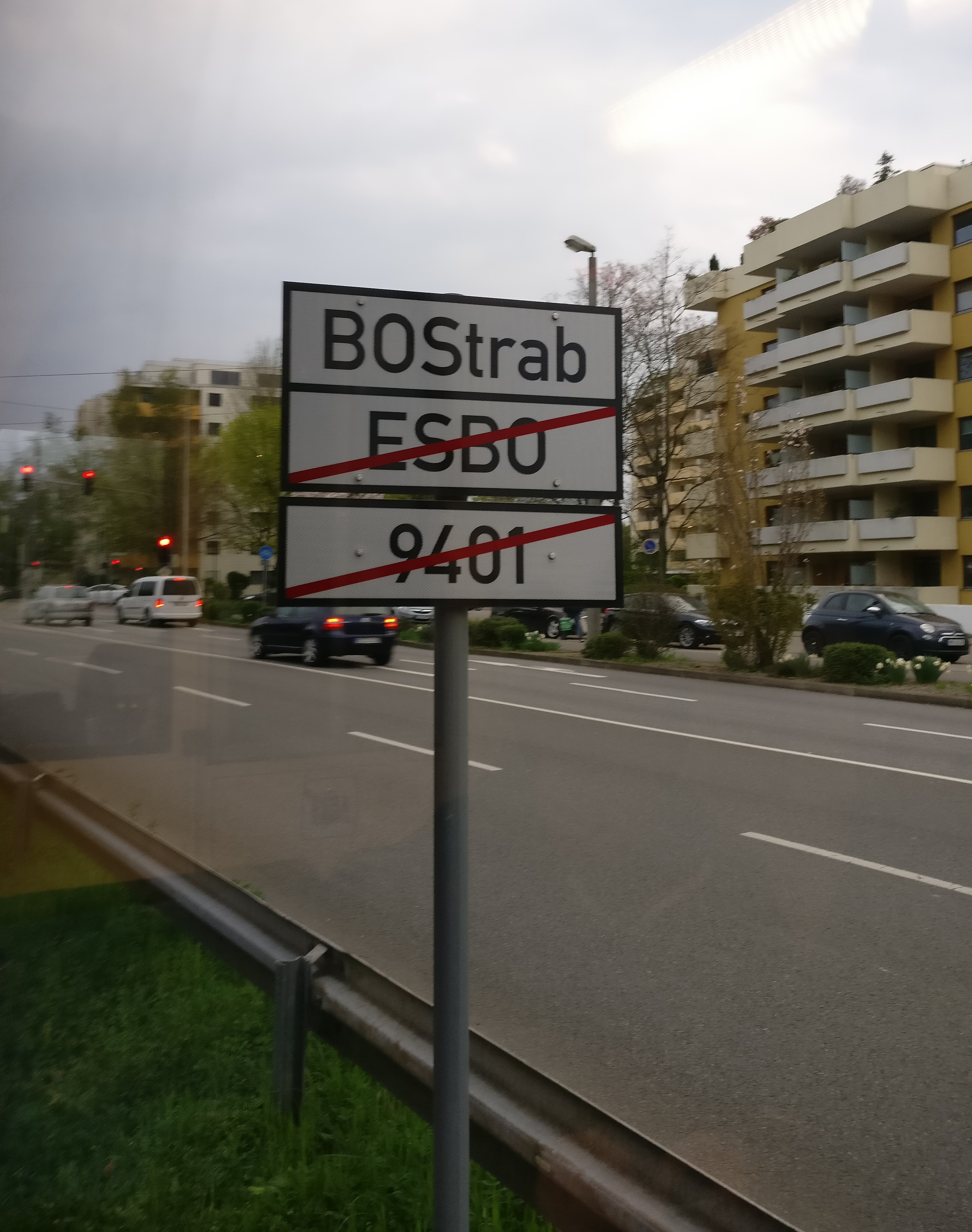
The end of the ESBO section before Burgstraße station

As a result of the upgrade of the OEG, it was integrated as a full line of the Heidelberg tram network in June 1999. Having formerly only stopped been between Bismarckplatz and Handschuhsheim Nord at Burgstraße, Handschuhsheim OEG-Bahnhof and Kußmaulstraße, OEG trains has since served all stops (except for the Froschäckerweg stop, but this has now been closed) and replaced tram line 1 on this section; this had previously been operated by the Heidelberg Tramway (HSB).

=== Transition to the RNV modernisation from 2005 ===
Since the OEG service has been unified with the RNV, it has operated as line number 5 since 10 December 2006.

Since the switchover to a computer-based interlocking on 10 April 2008, the Weinheim–Schriesheim–Handschuhsheim Nord section has been remotely controlled. Since then, the Schriesheim dispatcher has worked from the RNV central control centre at the Mannheim-Möhlstraße depot.

The long-planned modernisation of the nine kilometre long single-track line between Weinheim and Schriesheim began on 10 March 2010 with a symbolic groundbreaking ceremony. The duplicated track has allowed operations at 10-minute intervals and reduced journey times by 15%. The modernisation cost about €60 m, of which about €42 m was financed under the Municipal Transport Financing Act (Gemeindeverkehrsfinanzierungsgesetz).

The main reconstruction was done during a full closure of the line. Between 21 March 2011 and 5 November 2011, all trains on the section between Weinheim OEG station and Schriesheim station were replaced by buses, resulting in most cases in a significant extension of travel time. Weinheim OEG station was rebuilt during the summer school holidays. The trains during this period ran through Händelstraße station without stopping; it was equipped for this purpose with a temporary set of points connecting the tracks. Trains ran again on the now double-track line from 5 November.

Only two short sections in the streets of Großsachsen and Schriesheim remain as single track. In the course of restructuring, the entire Weinheim–Heidelberg route was equipped with a new electronic signalling system. The newly built Großsachsen Süd stop was also opened at the timetable change on 11 December 2011. The rebuilding of Schriesheim station was completed in mid 2012. Nine months after the completion of the construction work in August 2012, the journey time for the complete Mannheim–Heidelberg–Weinheim–Mannheim ring was reduced from 140 to 130 minutes, which corresponds approximately to the travel time ten years earlier. Already in December 2012, however, the travel time had been extended to 140 minutes to reduce delays compared to the timetable.

The whole signal infrastructure and signalling operations were renewed between 2010 and 2014. Since the spring of 2014, the entire line has been equipped with the "Ks" signalling system (Ks-Signalsystem), a new colour light signals system being introduced in Germany.

== Operations ==
Originally passenger traffic on the line was operated as one of four independently operated OEG lines and was referred to as line C. The carriage shed was in Schriesheim.

Operations were discontinued due to the Second World War from 26 March to 18 June 1945.

Steam locomotives were replaced by diesel locomotives on the last non-electrified section, between Weinheim and Schriesheim, on 8 January 1954.

Trains ran every 24 minutes from 2 June 1957.

After the completion of electrification of the OEG Mannheim–Heidelberg–Weinheim–Mannheim triangular route in 1956, the two train services running to Weinheim were joined, with every second train continued in Heidelberg, creating so-called "round trip" services. Normal train services were also joined in Heidelberg from 30 May 1965, so that all trains now ran on round trips except for additional peak-hour services. A round trip took 122 minutes.

Half-hourly services were introduced on 25 September 1966. The point where trains crossed had been relocated from Schriesheim to Schriesheim Süd. On 25 September, the crossing point was moved back to Schriesheim and the crossing loop in Schriesheim Süd was closed.

A reduced timetable with less regular intervals was operated from 1 July 1971 to 31 June 1973. Afterwards, the operation of regular-interval trains every half hour was restored, with 20-minute intervals in the peak hours. After the morning peak, services between Weinheim and Schriesheim ran hourly until 27 May 1979. The circuit route was interrupted in Schriesheim until 28 September 1974 (and in Mannheim since 1943). Duewag-GT8 sets were used on the northern part of the line, while trains with B4 trailer cars and "half and full trains" (Halb- und Ganzzüge) were used on the southern part.

Another half-hour cycle was introduced on 23 May 1993 and additional trains ran between Schriesheim and Heidelberg. The top speed was increased from 60 km/h to 80 km/h.

In 1995, the Weinheim and Heidelberg train services were also joined in Mannheim. So OEG trains have circulated around the circuit since then, except for trains that reverse in Edingen/Schriesheim or Käfertal/Weinheim. Trains running the entire circuit were initially designated as line 62 in 1995, as the VRN envisaged adopting a network-wide naming scheme. However, since the MVV used the designation 5 for the OEG service running within Mannheim on its light rail network, the VRN eventually used the designation 5R for trains running on the whole circuit. In the VRN's timetable book, however, the timetable was listed in table "R 65". The distinction between 5 (for the trains running only between Käfertal and Edingen) and 5R was finally abandoned at the end of 2006 and since then only the designation 5 has been used. This designation is now also used in the timetable book.
