= Trams in Heidelberg =

Overview of the tramway network in Heidelberg

Heidelberg tramway network
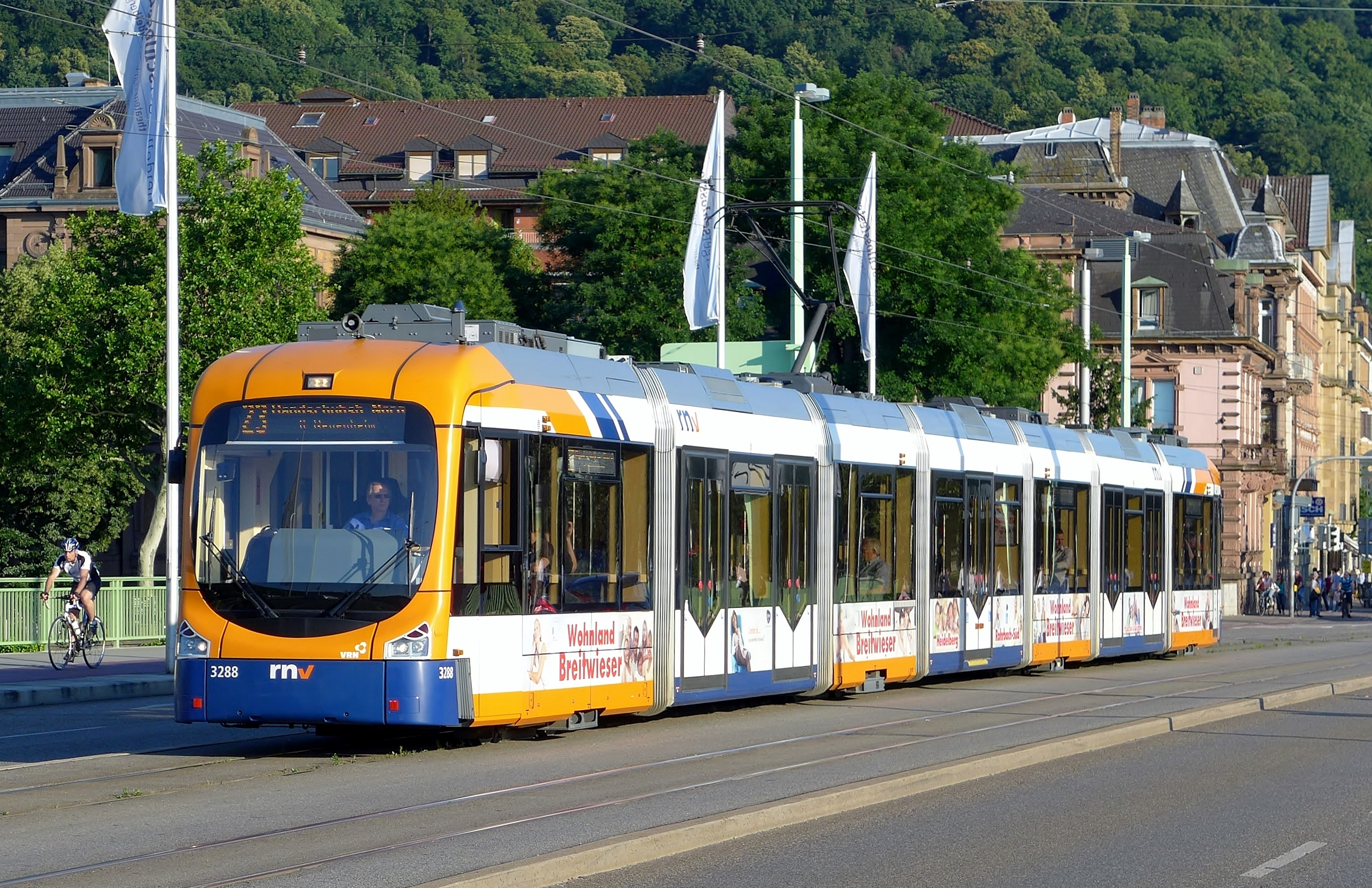
- A tram on line 23 crosses the Theodor-Heuss-Brücke, 2014

Operation
- Locale: Heidelberg, Baden-Württemberg, Germany
- Operator: Rhein-Neckar-Verkehr

Statistics
Horsecar era: 1885–1901
- Status: Superseded
- Track gauge: 1,000 mm (3 ft 3 3/8 in) metre gauge
- Propulsion system: Horses
Electric tram era: since 1901
- Status: Operational
- Lines: 6
- Track gauge: 1,000 mm (3 ft 3 3/8 in)
- Propulsion system: Electricity
- Electrification: 750 V DC
- Heidelberg tramway network as of 2023.
- Website: https://www.rnv-online.de/ Rhein-Neckar-Verkehr (in German)

The Heidelberg tramway network (German: Straßenbahnnetz Heidelberg) is a network of tramways forming an important element of the public transport system in Heidelberg, a city in the federal state of Baden-Württemberg, Germany.

Opened in 1885, the first electric tram ran in 1901. The network has been operated since 2009 by Rhein-Neckar-Verkehr (RNV) within the Verkehrsverbund Rhein-Neckar (VRN). The network includes line 5 of the Mannheim/Ludwigshafen tram system, which is connected with Heidelberg’s tram system via the Upper Rhine Railway Company (Oberrheinische Eisenbahn-Gesellschaft, OEG).

== Lines ==
As of 2013, the Heidelberg tramway network had the following lines:

| Line | Route |
|---|---|
| 5 | Weinheim – Mannheim – Heidelberg – Weinheim: (OEG) Weinheim – Viernheim – Käfertal – Mannheim – Edingen – Wieblingen – Hauptbahnhof – Bismarckplatz – Neuenheim – Handschuhsheim – Dossenheim - Schriesheim – Weinheim |
| 21 | Bismarckplatz – Hauptbahnhof – Technologiepark – Hans-Thoma-Platz: Bismarckplatz – Adenauerplatz – Poststraße – Stadtbücherei – Stadtwerke – Hauptbahnhof – Betriebshof – Jahnstraße – Bunsengymnasium – Technologiepark – Heiligenbergschule – Hans-Thoma-Platz → no evening service, Mon–Fri only |
| 22 | Bismarckplatz – Bergheimer Straße – Pfaffengrund – Eppelheim: Bismarckplatz – Seegarten – Stadtbücherei – Ringstraße – Montpellierbrücke – Hauptbahnhof Süd – Gadamerplatz – Eppelheimer Terrasse – Henkel-Teroson-Straße – Marktstraße – Kranichweg/Stotz - Jakobsgasse - Eppelheim Rathaus - Kirchheimer Straße |
| 23 | Handschuhsheim – Neuenheim – Bismarckplatz – Weststadt – Rohrbach – Leimen: Burgstraße – Biethsstraße – Hans-Thoma-Platz – Kapellenweg – Blumenthalstraße – Kußmaulstraße – Brückenstraße – Bismarckplatz – Adenauerplatz – Poststraße – Stadtbücherei – Römerkreis Süd – Christuskirche – S-Bahnhof Weststadt/Südstadt – Bergfriedhof – Bethanien-Krankenhaus – Rheinstraße – Markscheide – Eichendorffplatz – Rohrbach Markt – Ortenauer Straße – Freiburger Straße – Rohrbach Süd – Zementwerk – Johannes-Reidel-Straße – Georgi-Marktplatz – Kurpfalz-Centrum – Moltkestraße – Leimen Friedhof → After 21:00, departs from Bismarckplatz; evening and early morning weekend services towards Handschuhsheim are served by line 5 |
| 24 | (Schriesheim –) Handschuhsheim – Technologiepark – Hauptbahnhof – Weststadt – Rohrbach Süd: (Schriesheim Bahnhof – Schriesheim Süd – Dossenheim Nord – Dossenheim Bahnhof – Dossenheim Süd –) Burgstraße – Biethsstraße – Hans-Thoma-Platz – Heiligenbergschule – Technologiepark – Bunsengymnasium – Jahnstraße – Betriebshof – Hauptbahnhof – Stadtwerke – Römerkreis Süd – Christuskirche – S-Bahnhof Weststadt/Südstadt – Bergfriedhof – Bethanien-Krankenhaus – Rheinstraße – Markscheide – Eichendorffplatz – Rohrbach Markt – Ortenauer Straße – Freiburger Straße – Rohrbach Süd → Serving Schriesheim only weekdays in the rushhour every 20 minutes (10 times a day) |
| 26 | Burgstraße – Bismarckplatz –Bahnstadt – Messplatz – Kirchheim: Burgstraße – Biethsstraße – Hans-Thoma-Platz –Kapellenweg – Blumenthalstraße – Kußmaulstraße – Brückenstraße – Bismarckplatz – Altes Hallenbad – Campus Bergheim – Volkshochschule – Betriebshof – Czernybrücke – Gadamerplatz – Hauptbahnhof Süd – Rudolf-Diesel-Straße – Messplatz – Ilse-Krall-Straße – Albert-Fritz-Straße – Odenwaldstraße – Kirchheim Rathaus – Kirchheim Friedhof |

== Current fleet ==
The current fleet of RNV trams at operating in Heidelberg currently consists of:

- 16 eight-axle Rhine-Neckar Variobahns from Bombardier, built in 2002 and 2003 (numbers 3273 to 3280 without energy storage), as well as 2009 and 2010 (numbers 3281 to 3288 with energy storage)
- 10 six-axle Rhine-Neckar Variobahns from Bombardier, built between 2005 and 2006 (numbers 4133–4138 and 4140–4142 without energy storage) and 2009 (number 4143 with energy storage)

Since 2024/2025, RNV has been operating the newly built Rhein-Neckar Tram 2020 on several routes within the city, as well as on the line 5 circulator. This has allowed for the retirement of many remaining Düwag vehicles in the city, which have been experiencing increased technical difficulties in regular service.

== History ==
=== Early suburban trains ===
In 1883, the Leferenz brothers received a concession for a local railway from Heidelberg to Schriesheim, extending to Weinheim, but they were unable to realize the project for financial reasons. In 1887, they sold the concession to Herrmann Bachstein, who had already received the concession for the Mannheim–Weinheim line in 1886. Bachstein, opened this line in the same year. In 1890, the Weinheim–Heidelberg line followed, running along the Bergstrasse (Mountain Road) via Leutershausen, Schriesheim, Dossenheim, and Handschuhsheim.

The Mannheim–Heidelberg line via Wieblingen, Edingen, and Neckarhausen was completed in 1891. In 1897, the railway was incorporated into the South German Railway Company (SEG) and in 1911 became the Upper Rhine Railway Company.

=== Horse-drawn Trams ===
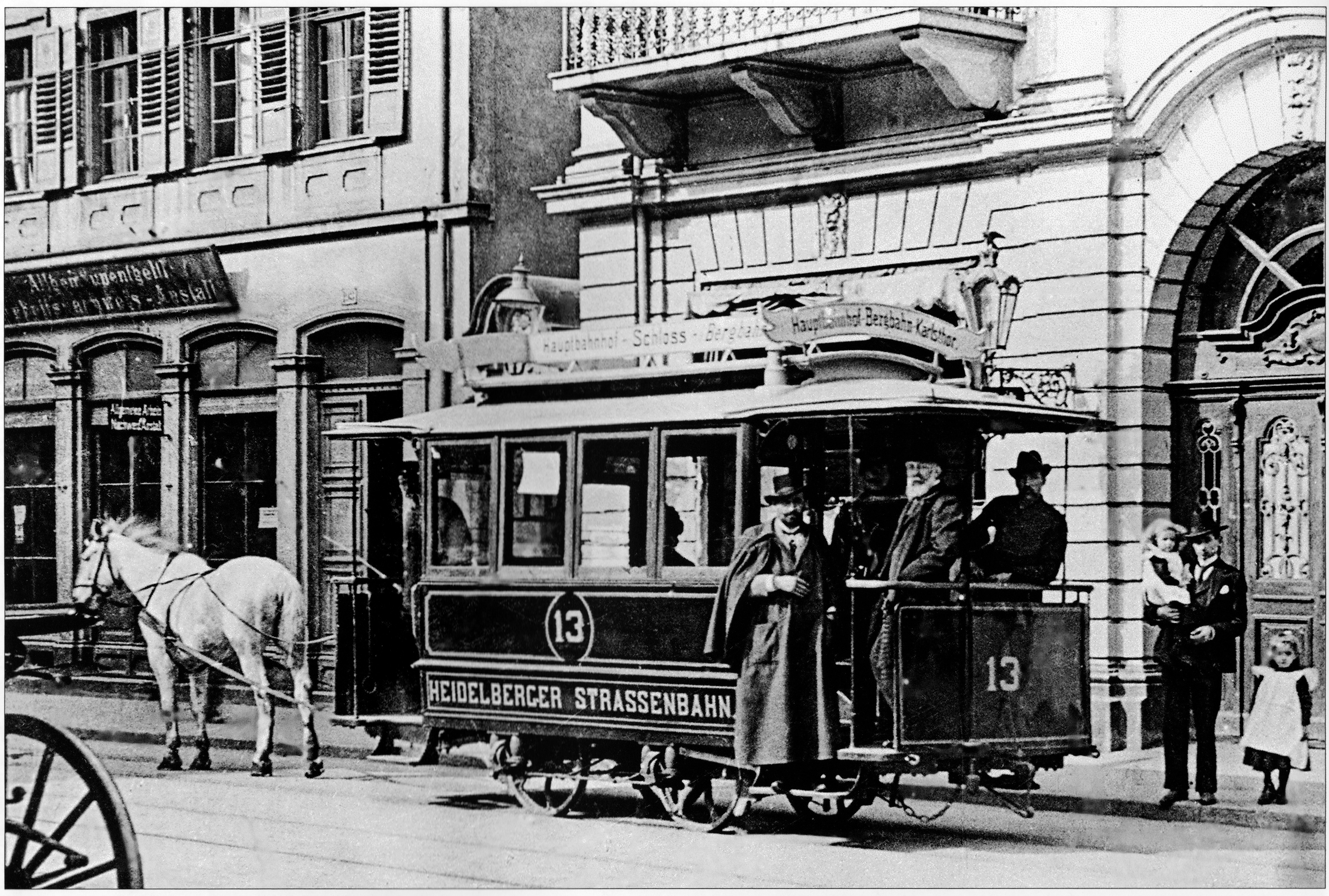
Wagen 13 der Heidelberger Pferde-Straßenbahn in der Ausweiche am Kornmarkt. (1896)

The history of inner-city local transport in Heidelberg began in 1871. Concession applications for the construction of a horse-drawn tram were submitted, but all of them were initially rejected. Even when the horse-drawn tram was opened in neighboring Mannheim in 1878, the residents of Heidelberg were still skeptical. It was not until 1883 that a concession for a horse-drawn tram was granted, albeit subject to conditions. In March 1885, the Heidelberg Tram and Mountain Railway Company Leferenz and Co. (HSB) was founded, which immediately began construction work and on 13 May opened the first line from Heidelberg Hauptbahnhof to Marktplatz. On 8 September the line from Bayrischer Hof to Römerplatz followed and on 22 July, 1886 the route network reached a length of 3.7 Kilometers with the opening of the line from the main station to Steigerweg. In 1887, the company was renamed Heidelberger Straßen- und Bergbahn AG (HSB). On 30 March 1890, the first section of the Heidelberg mountain railway was opened. On 1 April 1890, a 6-minute interval was introduced in Bergheimer Straße, and exactly eight years later also on the route to Rohrbach.

In 1892, the horse-drawn tram carried 934,685 passengers with its 12 closed carriages, 8 open carriages, 37 horses, and 33 human employees. Due to the rapidly increasing number of passengers on the horse-drawn tram, there were considerations as early as 1895 to build a more powerful electric tram instead of the horse-drawn tram. Here, too, there were numerous negotiations that delayed implementation.

On 28 February 1900, the city of Heidelberg bought three quarters of the shares in HSB. In 1901, the horse-drawn tram carried about 1.61 million passengers with 45 equestrian and 40 human employees as well as 14 closed and 10 open cars.

=== 1901-1926: Electric Trams ===
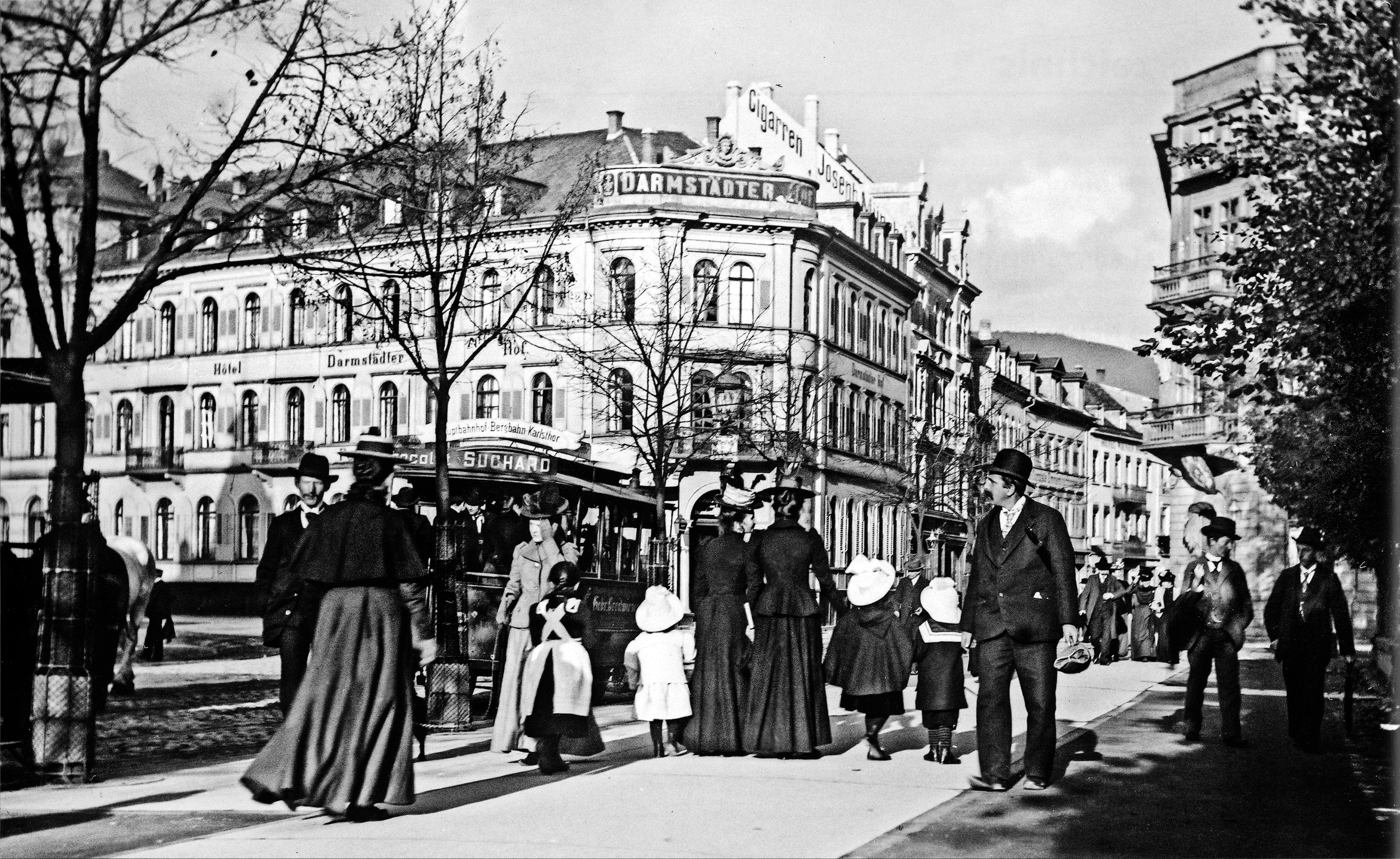
Fußgänger und Straßenbahn in Heidelberg am Bismarckplatz, Blickrichtung Hauptstraße (Hotel Darmstädter Hof, heute Darmstädter-Hof-Centrum) (ca. 1895)

South of Heidelberg the villages of Rohrbach, Leimen, Nußloch, and Wiesloch were also striving for better transport connections, as the Rhine Valley Railway had bypassed their historic centers. On 6 June, 1900 the Deutsche Eisenbahn-Gesellschaft was granted permission for the Heidelberg–Wiesloch electric tramway, the first section of which was opened on 23 July 1901, almost a year after construction began on 1 August. It purchased its wagons from the local Fuchs wagon factory in Rohrbach. Between Heidelberg Central Station and the cemetery, the tracks of the horse-drawn tram were also used, which had initially delayed construction due to negotiations. Therefore, operations from the cemetery to Kaiserstraße did not start until 22 August. Four days later the extension to Bunsenstraße also entered service. The remaining section to the central station forecourt followed on 21 October 1901.

In the early days, the railway was able to generate good profits by also transporting stones from the quarry in Nußloch to the Leimen cement works. This freight traffic did not end until 1918, when the Leimen–Nußloch material ropeway was built for this task.

In March 1902, construction work began on the electric tram in Heidelberg. The first tram ran in the same month – from 16 March – between the main station and the cemetery, as the electrified tram line to Wiesloch could be used there. Construction work on the rest of the line lasted until October. The depot west of the slaughterhouse was handed over on 5 October. On October 6, 1902, the last horse-drawn tram car ran, and the next day the electric tram service between Schlachthof, Hauptbahnhof and Karlstor was opened with a four-minute interval in Hauptstraße. Some horse-drawn tram cars continued to be used as trailers for the electric tramway; the last surviving horse-drawn tram car is now in the Hanover Tram Museum. The horse-drawn tram depot between Poststraße and Römerstraße was sold in 1903.

Approval for the first extensions followed on 23 October 1903, and construction began on 16 November. The section to Kußmaulstraße in Neuenheim was opened on 1 March, and on 30 April 1904 the rest of the line to the Grüner Hof in Handschuhsheim. It ran single-track next to the single-track line of the SEG, as it had already done in Bergheimer Straße, and ended at today's day-care centre in Handschuhsheimer Landstraße. In 1912, the line was moved to Mittelstraße (today's Steubenstraße) and ran west past the Tiefburg to Biethstraße. From 1919, the trains ended at the turnout at Grahampark south of the Tiefburg.

On 1 July 1905, the Heidelberg – Wiesloch electric tram was purchased by the city of Heidelberg for 1.9 million marks and leased to the HSB as operator. On 24 July 1923, the HSB took over the suburban railway – which had received a branch line from Rohrbach to Kirchheim in 1910 – from the city of Heidelberg and paid the purchase price with shares, making the city the majority shareholder of HSB.

Now further route extensions followed: On 30 April 1910, the line to Schlierbach was approved, which went into operation on 1 November 1910, after a bus line established at the end of October 1905 was discontinued on this route in July 1906 due to unprofitability; on 4 November 1912, the permit for the extension to Neckargemünd Hanfmarkt followed, the construction of which began on 15 May 1913 and which went into operation on 1 April 1914.

On 16 April 1914, the construction of the single-track line to Eppelheim Rathaus was decided, after the city of Heidelberg had been granted the concession for this on 9 August 1905. The Schlachthaus–Czernystraße line was opened to passenger traffic on 8 June 1914 and the section from Güteramtsstraße (today's Czernyring) to the new freight yard on 1 September 1914, where hospital transports were carried out until 1 June 1915. From 20 January 1919, the tram tracks in the freight yard were dismantled. Construction of the actual line began on 13 July. After the outbreak of the First World War, construction was temporarily suspended, but resumed in November. This meant that the line could be opened on 3/4 April 1919 despite the difficult economic situation.

On November 2, 1914, a "war timetable" came into force.

With 16.7 million passengers in 1919, HSB transported more passengers this year than in previous years. In the previous year, there were only 8.9 million passengers.

During the hyperinflationary period, the HSB came under such severe economic pressure that it completely ceased operations from 26 November 1923 to 21 January 1924. Gradually, the HSB then put its route network back into operation. By 13 April 1924, the tracks at Bismarckplatz had been rebuilt. In the autumn of 1925, the pre-war level was reached again.

=== 1926–1945: Further Network Expansion ===
In the mid 1920s, thanks to improved financial conditions, two further lines could be built:

- On March 17, 1926, a highly controversial line to Wieblingen was opened, which was in direct competition with the OEG (Oberrheinische Eisenbahn-Gesellschaft). The OEG offered to electrify the line to Wieblingen and allow the HSB (Heidelberg-Stadt Railway) to operate its own service there until the OEG itself was able to implement better connections. However, at the request of the residents of Wieblingen, this was rejected by the city, and the construction of the new line through the center of Wieblingen was chosen on September 15, 1921. The final construction permit was granted on August 10, 1925.
- On August 8/9, 1925, the line to Wieblingen was opened. In April 1927, the interurban tram line from Eppelheim via Plankstadt to Schwetzingen was opened, where it connected to the Schwetzingen–Ketsch tramway. It had already been approved by the state of Baden on September 13, 1912, and by the citizens' committee on May 14, 1914. Construction began on November 8, 1926.

== See also ==
- List of town tramway systems in Germany
- Trams in Germany

== Bibliography ==
- Basten, Robert; Jeanmaire, Claude (1986). Heidelberger Strassenbahnen. Villingen (Schweiz), ISBN 3-85649-053-1 (in German)
- Höltge, Dieter (1999). Straßen- und Stadtbahnen in Deutschland [Tramways and Stadtbahnen in Germany] (in German). Vol. Band 6: Baden [Volume 6: Baden]. Freiburg i. B., Germany: EK-Verlag. ISBN 3882553375.
- Muth, Frank (2003). Straßenbahnen in Heidelberg. München, ISBN 3-7654-7197-6 (in German)
- Röth, Helmut (2006). Auf Schienen zwischen Odenwald und Pfalz. Fotografien 1955–1976. Ludwigshafen am Rhein, Verlag Pro Message. ISBN 3-934845-18-5. (in German)
- Verkehrsverbund Rhein-Neckar (Hrsg.) (2004). An einem Strang. Eisenbahngeschichte im Rhein-Neckar-Dreieck. Ludwigshafen, Verlag Pro Message. ISBN 3-934845-17-7 (in German)
