= Rohrbach, Heidelberg =

Rohrbach
- Stadtteil of Heidelberg
- Coat of arms

- Location of Rohrbach within Heidelberg
- Interactive map of Rohrbach
- Location within Germany Location within Baden-Württemberg
- Coordinates: 49°22′48″N 08°41′14″E
- Country: Germany
- State: Baden-Württemberg
- City: Heidelberg

Area
  - Total: 6.39 km^{2} (2.47 sq mi)

Population (2021-12-31)
  - Total: 16,105
  - Density: 2,520/km^{2} (6,530/sq mi)
- Time zone: UTC+01:00 (CET)
  - Summer (DST): UTC+02:00 (CEST)

Rohrbach is a district of the city of Heidelberg in Baden-Württemberg, Germany.

== Location ==
Rohrbach is located approximately three kilometers south of Heidelberg's city center, about halfway to Leimen.

Besides Alt-Rohrbach (Old Rohrbach) with the Melanchthon Church and the old town hall, Rohrbach is divided into the districts of Kühler Grund, Gewann See, Hasenleiser, and Rohrbach-Süd (industrial park). Also belonging to Rohrbach is the somewhat secluded, wooded, and agricultural area around the Bierhelderhof. The now independent Heidelberg districts of Boxberg and Emmertsgrund were formerly part of the Rohrbach cadastral area as well.

Including all its districts, Rohrbach has a total population of 16,105 (as of December 31, 2021).

Since Rohrbach's incorporation into Heidelberg in 1927, the southern border with Rohrbach has been Sickingenstraße. Before then, the border between Heidelberg and Rohrbach lay approximately 200 meters to the north – along Saarstraße and Markscheide (boundary line), whose names still reflect the former border.

== History ==
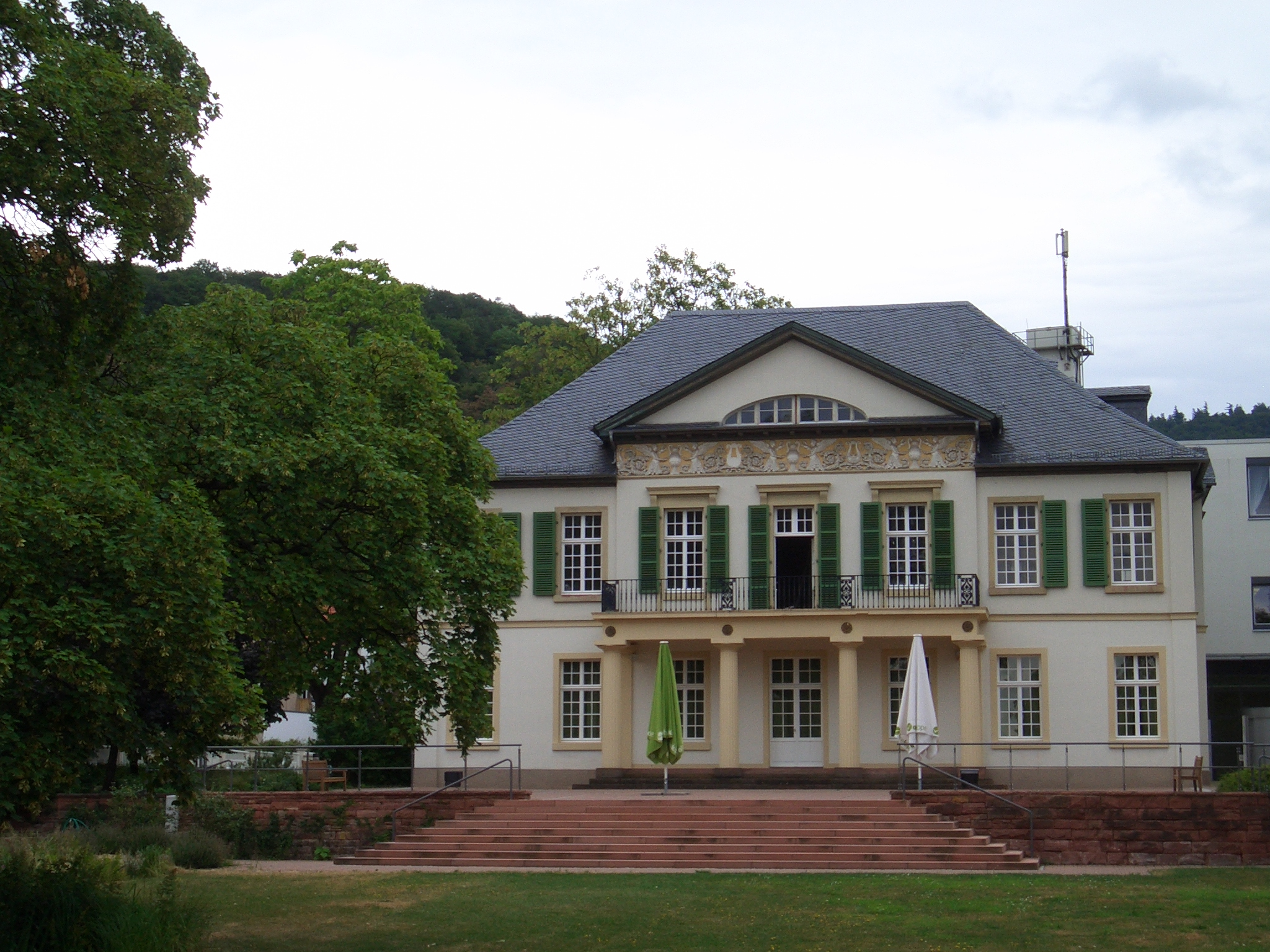
Rohrbach Castle

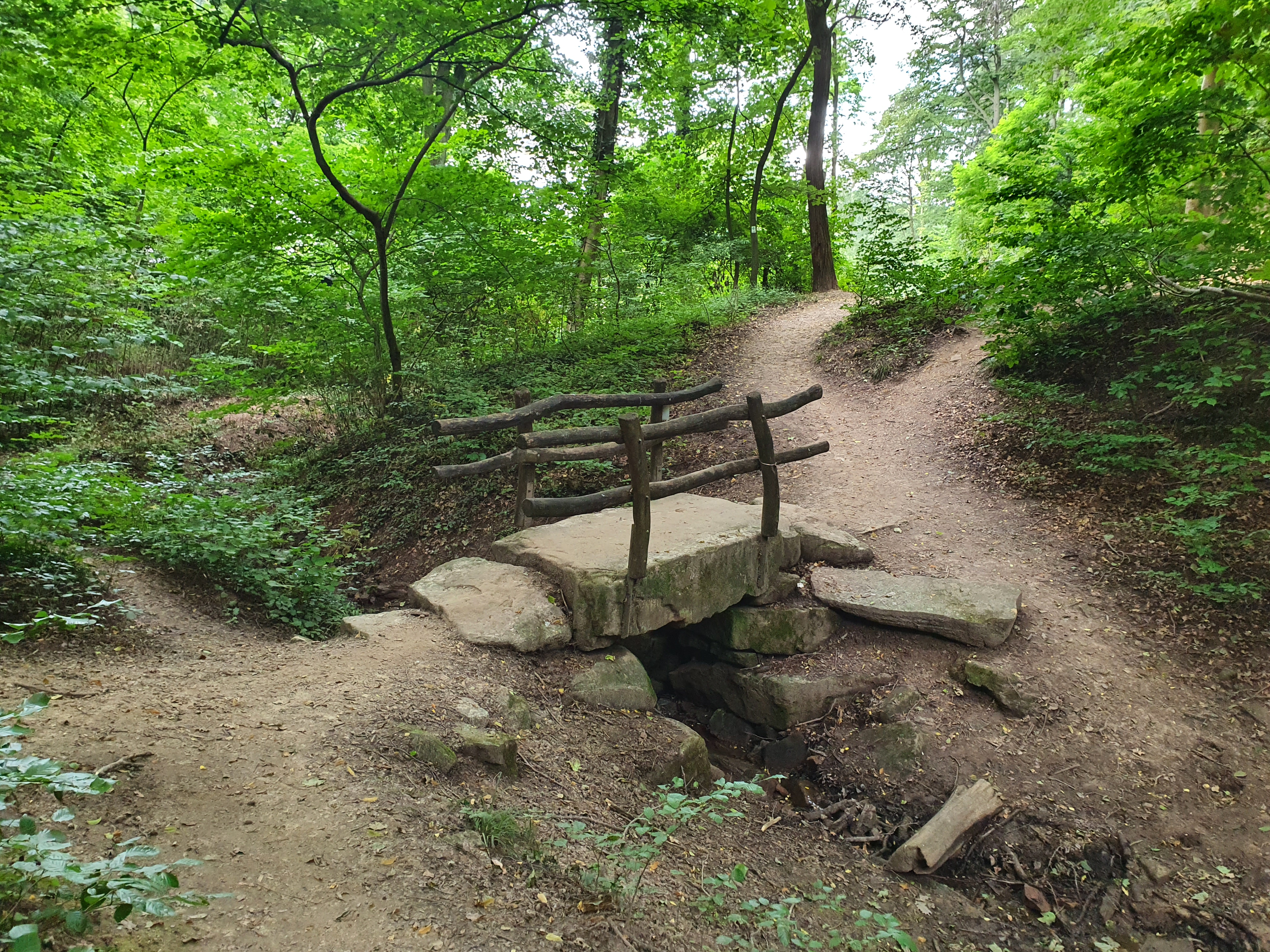
Bridge over the namesake Rohrbach brook

Rohrbach was first documented in the Lorsch Codex in 766, spelled Rorbach, where the donation of a vineyard to Lorsch Abbey is recorded there. The name Rohrbach is derived from the reeds (Rohr) growing along a local brook (Bach). Today, the lower reaches of the Rohrbach are canalized, completely built over, and part of the sewage system. Only in its upper reaches, in the area of the Kühlen Grund, can the Rohrbach still be seen in its open, though largely straightened, bed.

The village of Rohrbach, originally probably belonging to Kirchheim, was in the possession of the Counts Palatine of the Rhine from 1234 onwards. During the Thirty Years' War, which left hardly any survivors in Rohrbach, and during the War of the Palatine Succession, the village was repeatedly destroyed.

In 1901, Rohrbach was connected to the Heidelberg-Leimen-Wiesloch tram network for the first time. It was later incorporated into Heidelberg in 1927.

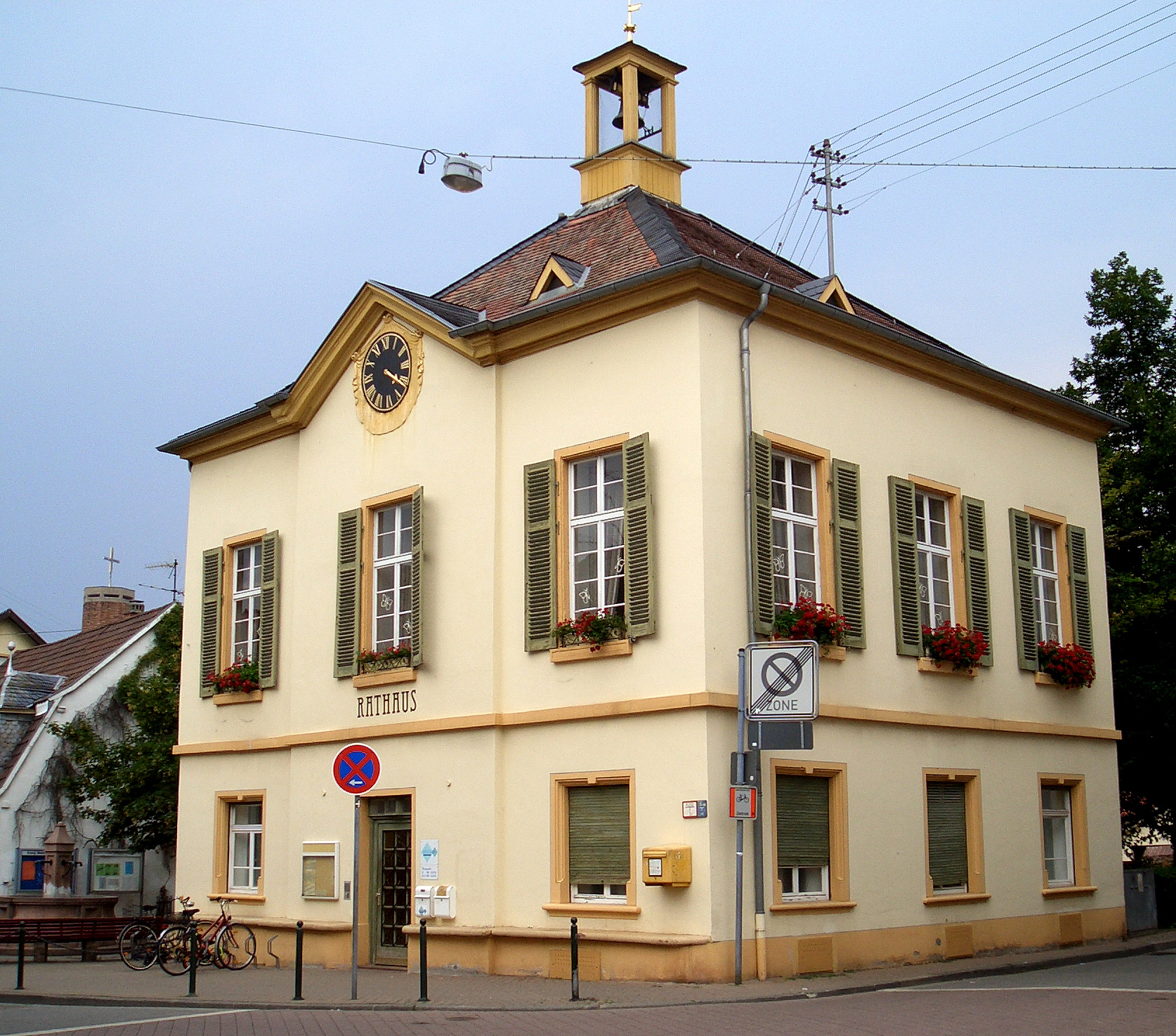
Old Rohrbach Town Hall

During the Kristallnacht in 1938, the village synagogue, built in 1845 and located on the site of today's town hall square, was completely destroyed. This was perpetrated in the early morning hours of November 10 by the same individuals who had already destroyed the former synagogue in Heidelberg's old town during the night of November 9 to 10. Today, the event is commemorated by a memorial stone.

From 1970 onwards, the Rohrbach South industrial park was created as part of the construction of the new Emmertsgrund district, which adjoins Rohrbach to the southeast. in which the several thousand inhabitants of Emmertsgrund were to find local employment and shopping opportunities.

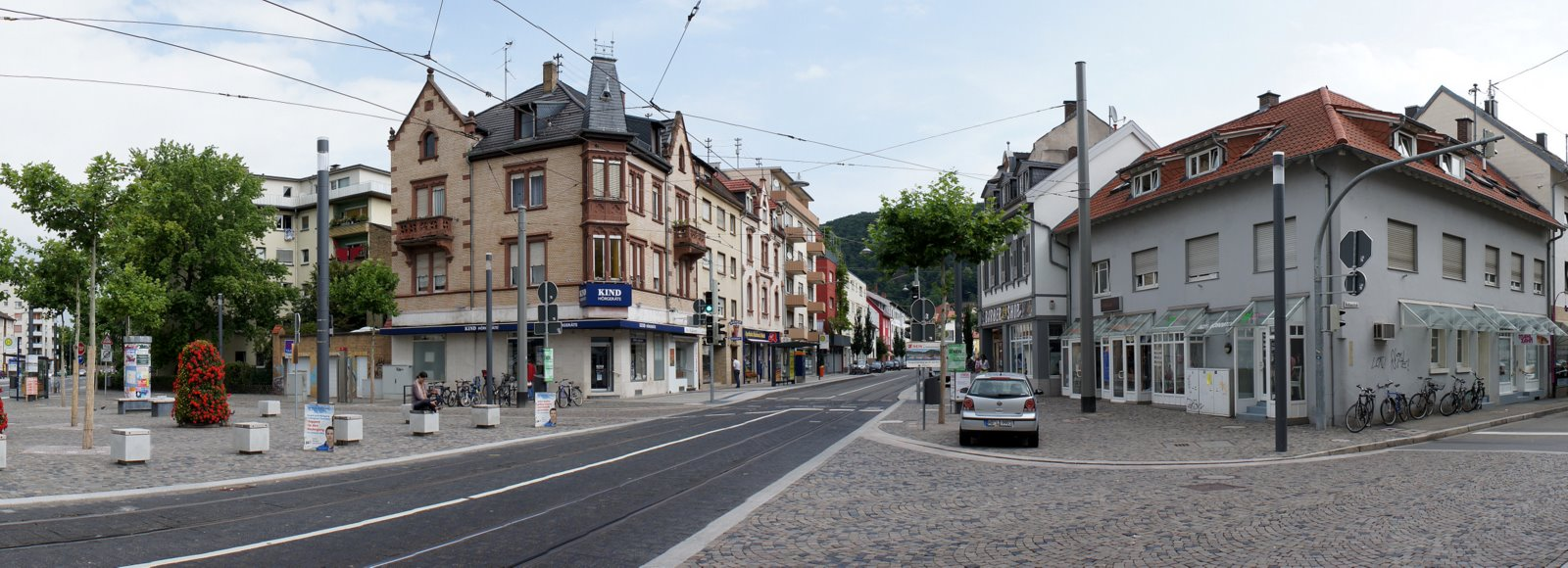
Newly designed market

== Coat of arms ==
Rohrbach Coat of Arms

Until its incorporation into Heidelberg, Rohrbach had its own coat of arms, which is still presented at local celebrations today.

Blazon: The letters r o r are drawn in a shield divided with an upper yellow field and a base of five blue wavy lines atop a white field.

The letters stand for the first part of the place name Ro(h)r(bach), while the blue wavy lines symbolize the brook of the same name.

Symbolism: The reed over the brook.

== Sightseeing ==
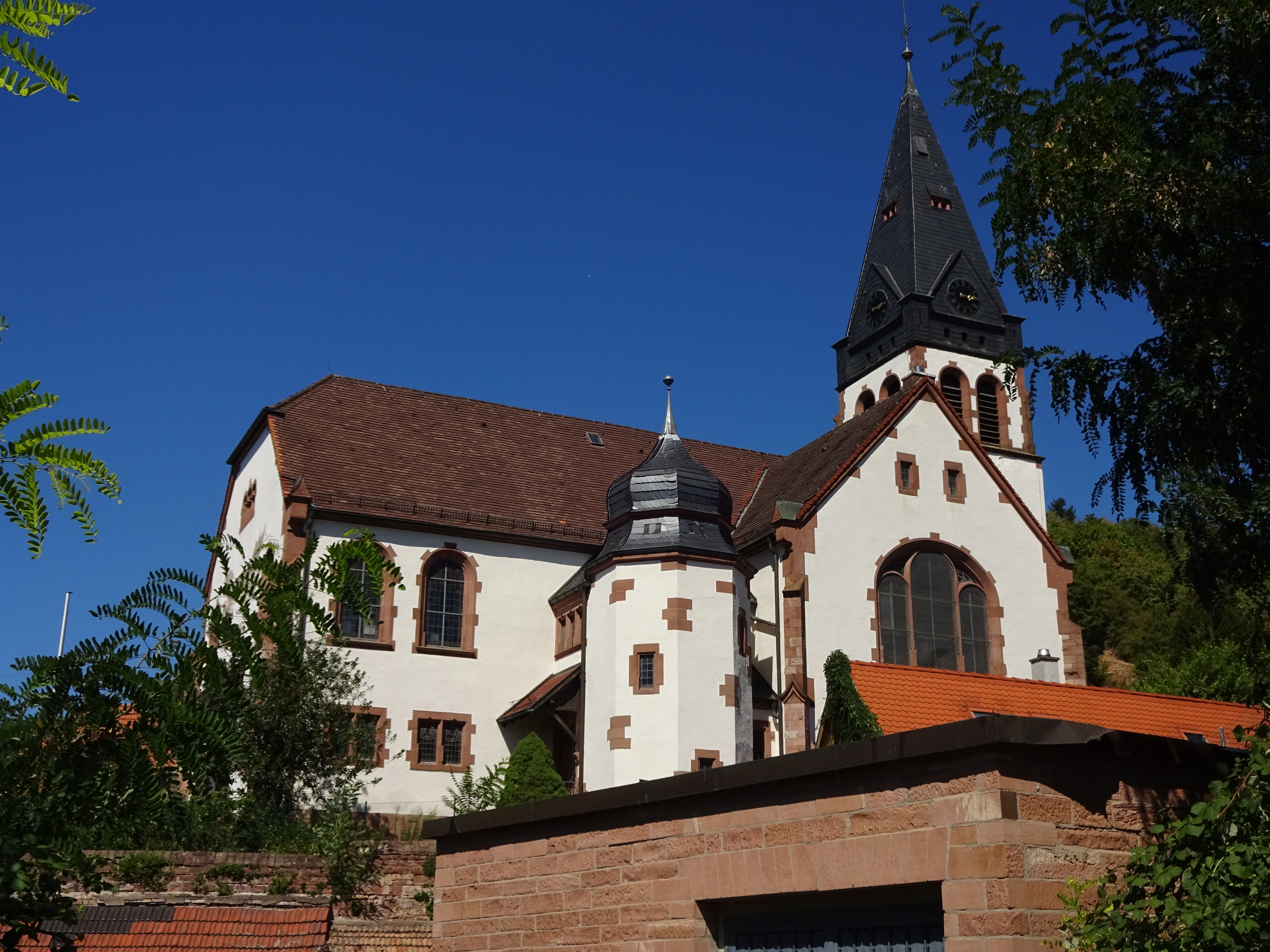
Melanchthon Church

The Protestant Melanchthon Church dates back to the 13th century and was rebuilt and enlarged in the Neo-Renaissance style by Hermann Behaghel in 1907/08. The Catholic St. John's Church, built in 1964, features stained-glass windows by Emil Wachter . In Hasenleiser is the St. Thomas Church of the Independent Evangelical-Lutheran Church, built in 1971.

Also noteworthy is the Rohrbach Castle, also called Rohrbach Castle, which is now part of the Thorax Clinic located above the town.

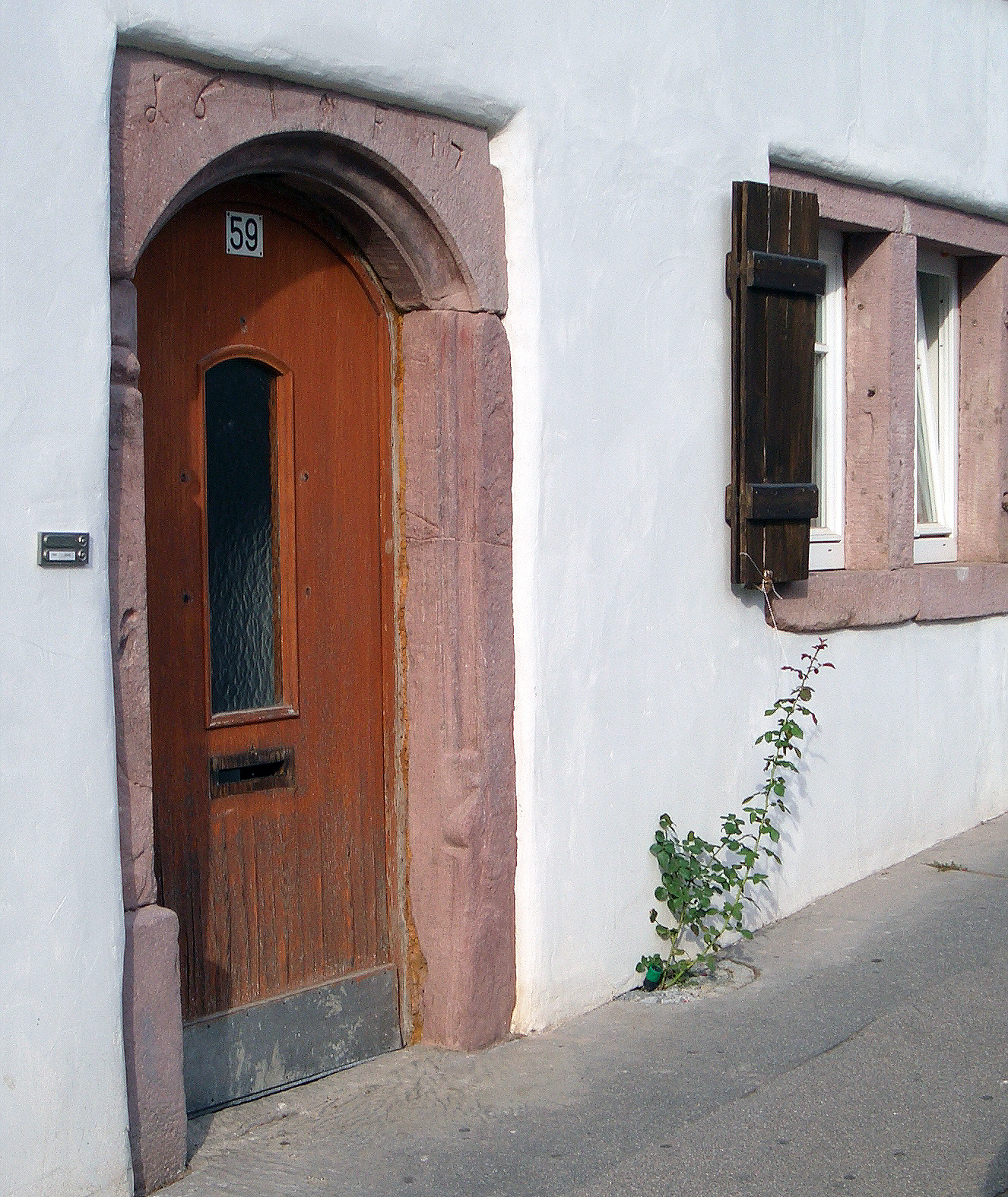
Oldest residential house in Rohrbach (1617)

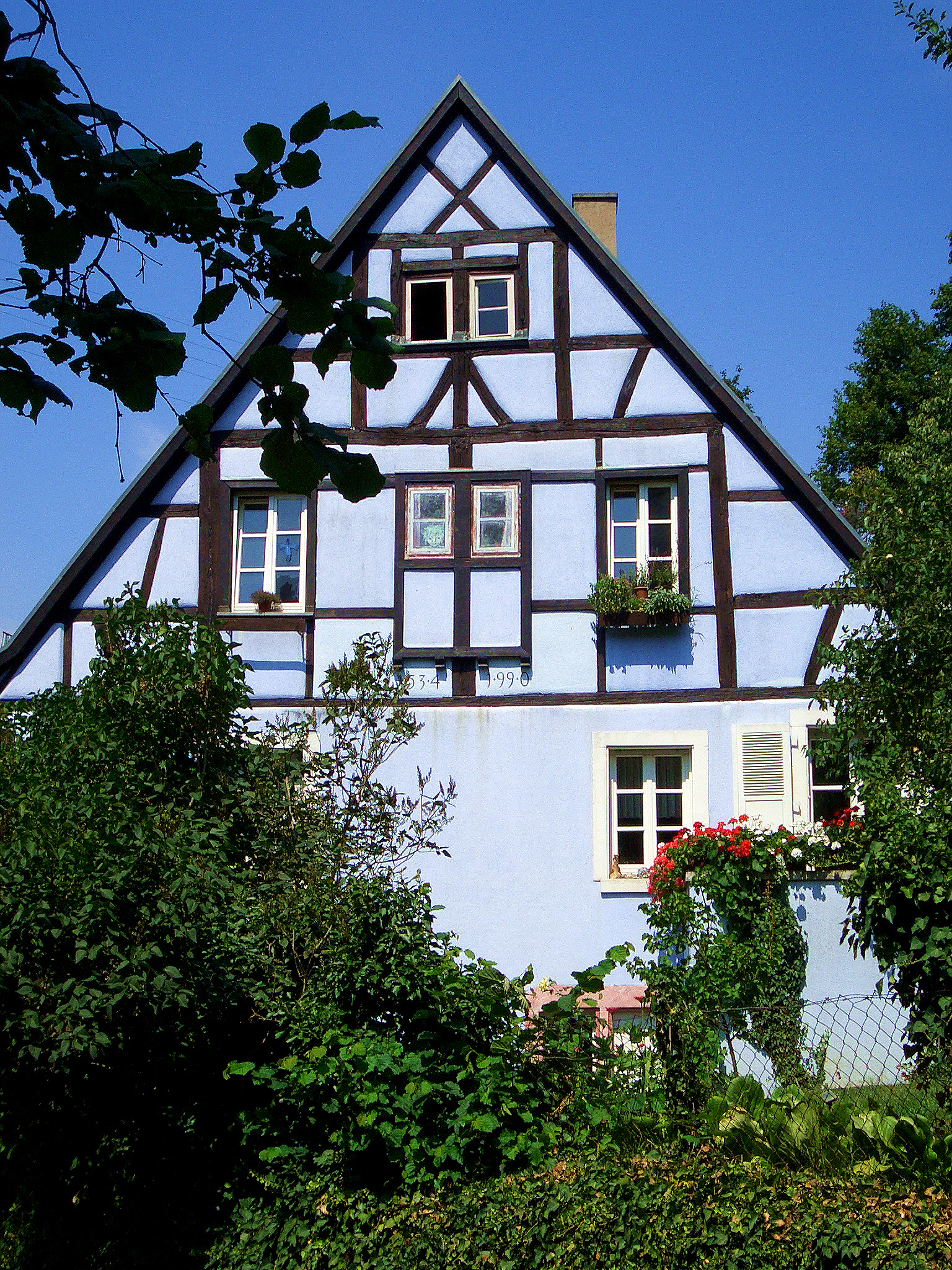
Former Rohrbach Mill (1534)

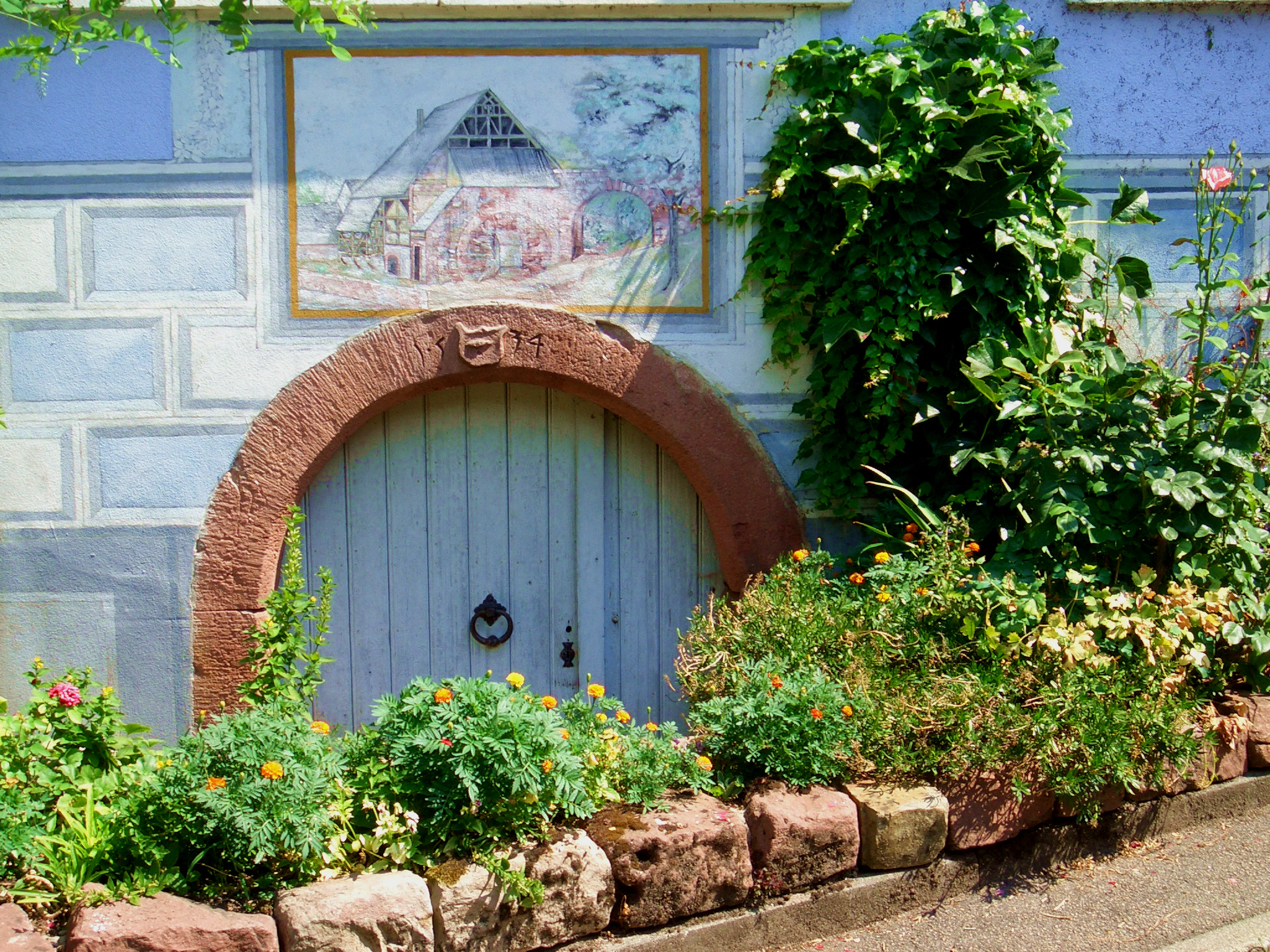
Detail of the Rohrbach Mill

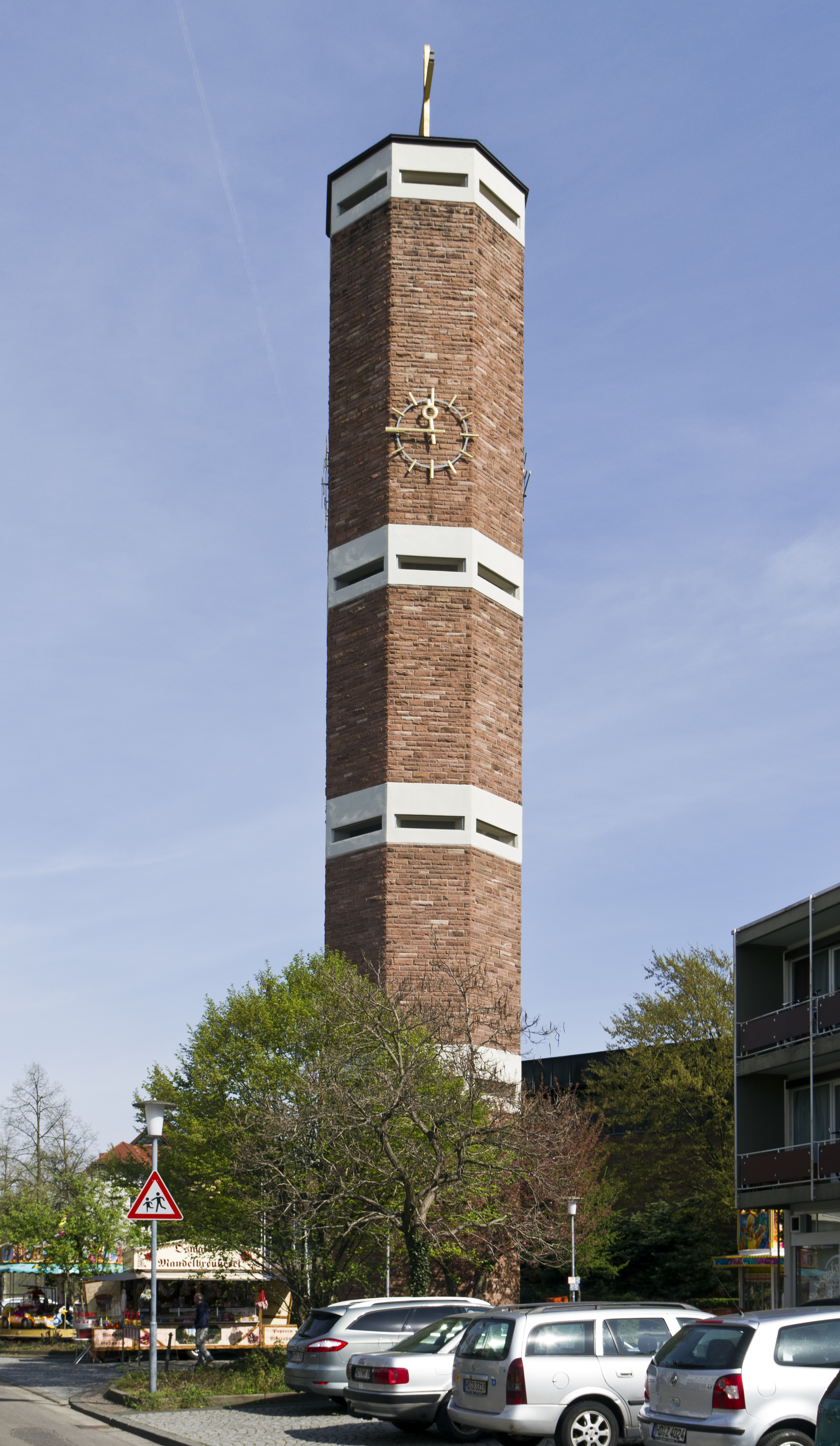
Catholic Church Steeple

== Educational and research institutions ==
=== Schools ===
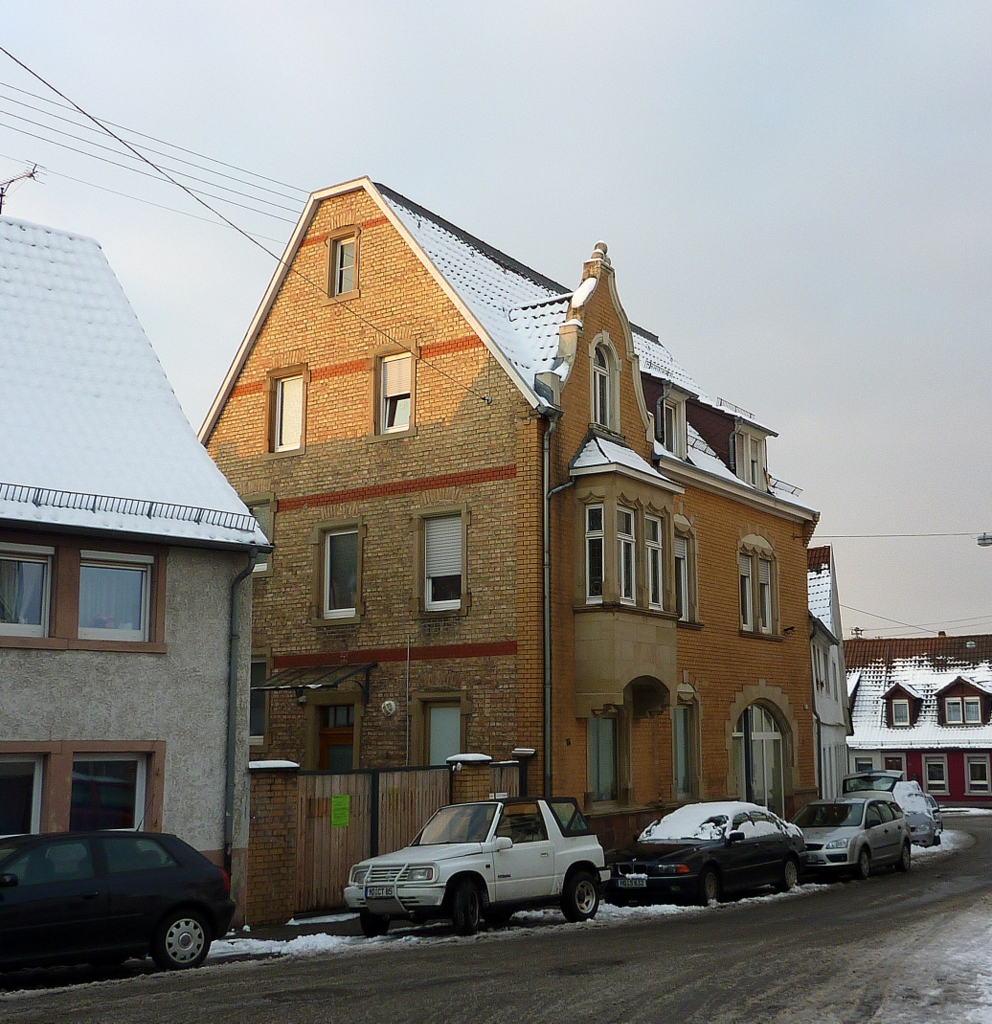
Local History Museum, Rohrbach

Rohrbach has two primary schools, one secondary school, and one comprehensive school:

- Eichendorff Elementary School (public)
- Free Christian School (Secondary School, private)
- International Comprehensive School Heidelberg (public)
- Montessori School Heidelberg (private primary school)

=== Institutes ===
- Thorax Clinic of the University Hospital of Heidelberg University
- Also located in Rohrbach is the Institute for Plastination, which is run by the anatomist Gunther von Hagens, the inventor of plastination and creator of the controversially discussed traveling exhibition Body Worlds.

=== Museums ===
- Rohrbach has had a small local history museum since 1971. Since 1996, it has been housed in the former Café Berg and the Gröschl bakery and presents the history of the town.

== Transportation ==
With a feeder road to federal motorway 5, federal highway 3, the Kirchheim/Rohrbach train station of the Rhine-Neckar S-Bahn, RNV tram lines 23 and 24 and several bus lines, Rohrbach has transport connections to the other districts of Heidelberg and to the surrounding area.

== Notable residents and visitors ==
- Punker of Rohrbach, legendary marksman of the 15th century.
- Johann Andreas von Traitteur, from 1790 to 1798 unfinished construction of a fresh water pipeline from Rohrbach to Mannheim, which was stopped halfway due to war and lack of money.
- Joseph von Eichendorff, who lived in Heidelberg from 1807 to 1808, also spent some time with his circle of friends at the Rohrbach inn "Zum roten Ochsen" (The Red Ox). There he met and fell in love with the local cooper's daughter Katharina Barbara Förster, nicknamed "Käthchen." He immortalized this affection in his diaries and in the song "In einem kühlen Grunde" (In a Cool Valley).
- Bertha Benz chugged through Rohrbach in her "Benz Motor Car No. 3" on the country road from Heidelberg in the early morning hours of August 5, 1888. The loudly rattling and strongly smelling vehicle looked like a carriage, but it had no horses to pull it. The route of this "bypass" followed the state road, turning right at the "Kreuz" (today Eichendorffplatz), past the town center, and went to the Gasthaus Rose. The Bertha Benz Memorial Route commemorates this journey.
- Christian Bitter (1878–1950) was mayor of Rohrbach from 1913 until its incorporation into Heidelberg in 1927 and was a member of the second chamber of the Baden Estates Assembly from 1913 to 1918.
- Arvid Boecker (* 1964), painter and curator, who lives and works in Heidelberg
- Hasret Kayikçi (* 1991), former Bundesliga record holder for SC Freiburg, grew up in Rohrbach and began her career at TSG Rohrbach.
