= Trams in Mannheim/Ludwigshafen =

Overview of the tramway network in Mannheim and Ludwigshafen

Mannheim/Ludwigshafen tramway network
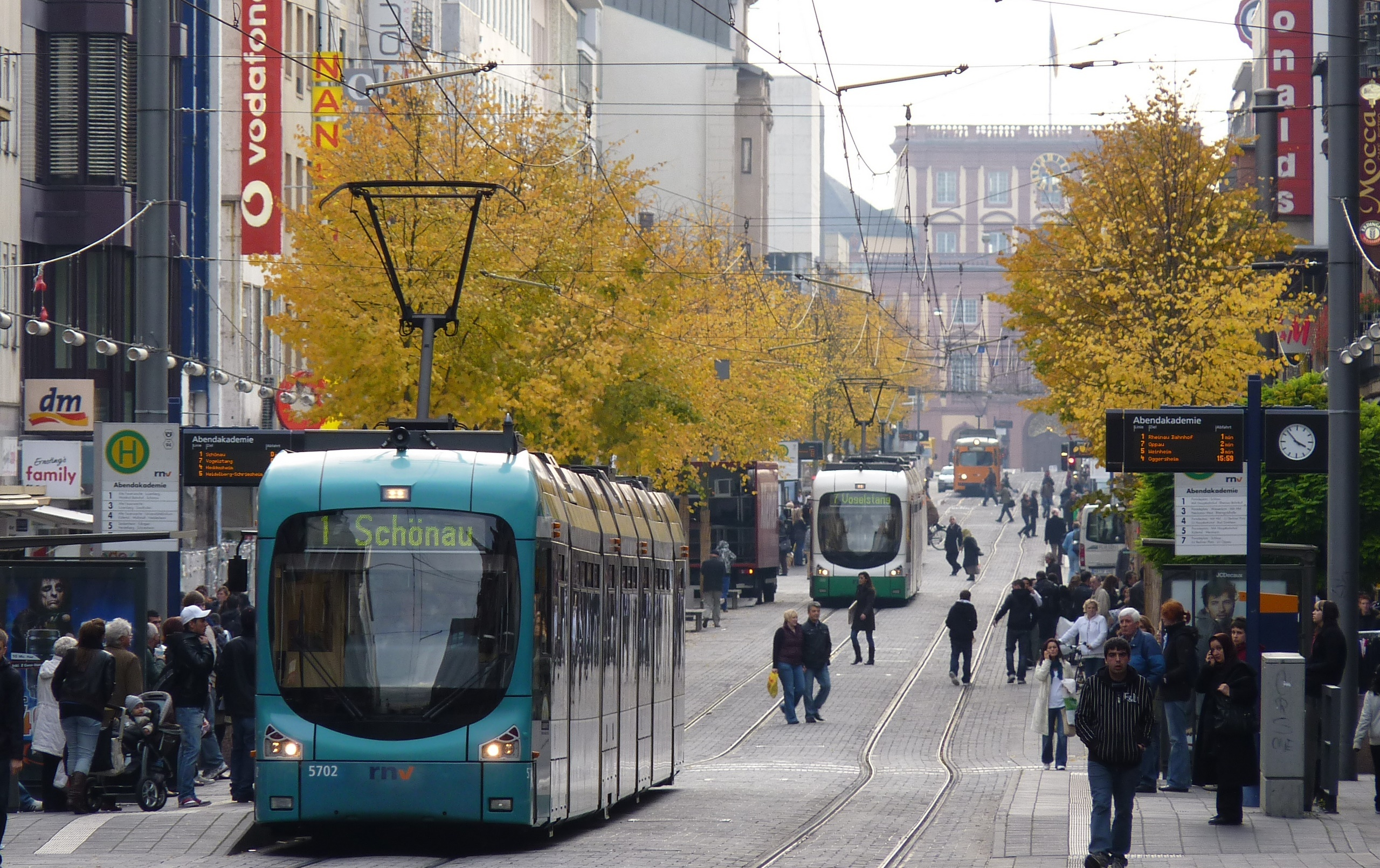

Operation
- Locale: Mannheim / Ludwigshafen, Rhine Neckar Area, Germany
- Open: 1878
- Status: Operational
- Lines: 10 (total line length 97 km (60 mi))
- Operator: Rhein-Neckar-Verkehr (RNV)

Infrastructure
- Track gauge: 1,000 mm (3 ft 3 3/8 in) metre gauge
- Propulsion system: Electricity
- Electrification: 750 V DC overhead lines

Statistics
- Route length: 61 km (38 mi)
Overview
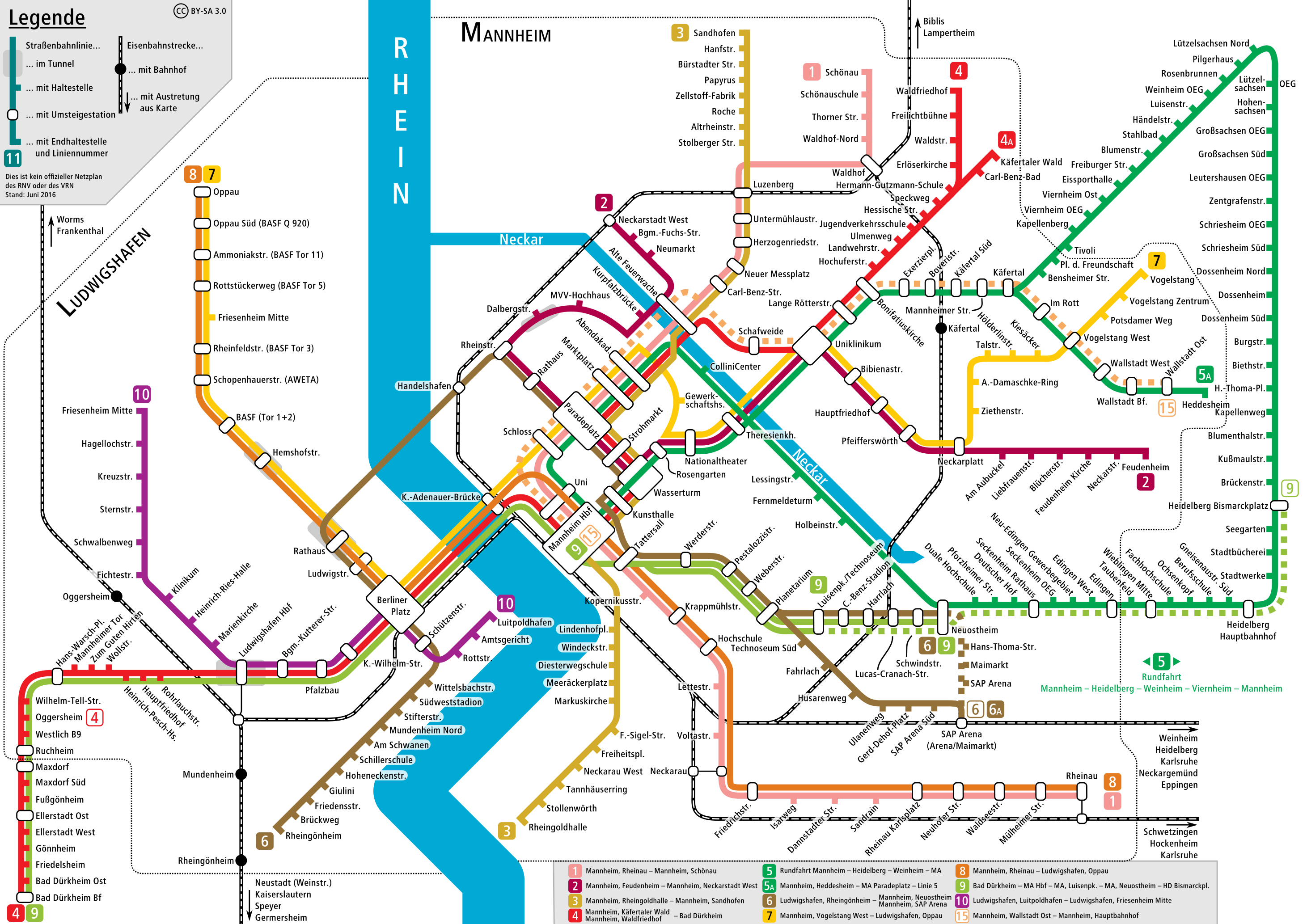
The network in 2016
- Website: Rhein-Neckar-Verkehr (RNV) (in English)

The Mannheim/Ludwigshafen tramway network (German: Straßenbahnnetz Mannheim/Ludwigshafen) is a metre-gauge transport network of tramways focused on the cities of Mannheim and Ludwigshafen am Rhein, and connected to Heidelberg tram network and to Weinheim via the Upper Rhine Railway Company (OEG), in the Rhine Neckar Area of Germany. The network has been operated since 2005 by Rhein-Neckar-Verkehr GmbH (RNV), and is integrated in the Verkehrsverbund Rhein-Neckar (VRN).

== History ==
Opened in 1878 with horse cars, the first line used normal gauge. In 1883 a line to Feudenheim started operating, using steam powered tram engines. The first electric trams started service in 1900.

== Fleet ==
Besides older tram cars and a large fleet of Rhein-Neckar-Variobahn trams, the delivery of the Rhein-Neckar-Tram 2020 (RNT 2020) started late 2022. The RNT 2020 comes in three lengths, with the twelve 38T version being the longest trams in the world at the time of delivery in 2025.

== See also ==
- List of town tramway systems in Germany
- Trams in Germany
