= Mannheim–Weinheim railway =

German railway line

Mannheim–Weinheim

Overview
- Line number: 669 (until 1970: 300g; until 1992: 568)
- Locale: Baden-Württemberg and Hesse, Germany

Service
- Route number: 9400

Technical
- Line length: 16.6 km (10.3 mi)
- Number of tracks: 2
- Track gauge: 1,000 mm (3 ft 3 3/8 in) metre gauge
- Minimum radius: 23 m (75 ft)
- Electrification: 750 V DC overhead catenary
- Operating speed: 80 km/h (50 mph)

The Mannheim–Weinheim railway is a metre-gauge railway between Mannheim-Neckarstadt-Ost/Wohlgelegen and Weinheim, mainly in the German state of Baden-Württemberg. It was built by the former Oberrheinischen Eisenbahn-Gesellschaft AG (Upper Rhine Railway Company, OEG), later MVV OEG AG and is now operated by MVV Verkehr GmbH (infrastructure owner) and RNV (operations manager and train operator) according to Eisenbahn-Bau- und Betriebsordnung für Schmalspurbahnen (narrow-gauge railway regulations; ESBO). However, the line is still owned by MVV Verkehr AG (the City of Mannheim's transport utility) as the successor to the OEG. It is operated as a branch line using electronic direct traffic control.

== History ==
=== The first years of operations ===
In 1886, the Centralverwaltung für Secundärbahnen Herrmann Bachstein (Hermann Bachstein Branch Line Central Organisation) was awarded the concession for the line from Mannheim to Käfertal and Viernheim to Weinheim, which was opened as early as 1887.

Finally, in 1892, the remaining gap between the two stations in Mannheim, the (Weinheimer Bahnhof (station to/from Weinheim) north of the Neckar and the Heidelberger Bahnhof (to/from Heidelberg) south of the Neckar) were closed. However, this connection via the Friedrich bridge (now the Kurpfalz bridge) was not used for public traffic.

=== Takeover by the SEG ===
The Bachstein company was absorbed into the South German Railway Company (Süddeutsche Eisenbahn-Gesellschaft AG, SEG), founded by Bachstein in 1895, which took over the operations of the Mannheim-Weinheim-Heidelberg-Mannheimer Eisenbahn (MWHME) in 1897.

The line from Mannheim towards Käfertal and Käfertaler Straße and Mannheimer Straße on the former Kronprinzenstraße (now Friedrich-Ebert-Straße) was moved on 16 July 1903 and the SEG then shared the tramway with city trams to/from Käfertal. A section of the old line in Mannheimer Straße remained as a connecting track to the national railway (at Käfertal station on the Mannheim–Frankfurt railway) until 1971.

For many decades a branch line branched off at Käfertal Wald station and ran through the Käfertaler Wald (forest) along Birkenallee to the waterworks opened in 1888. This siding was used to supply the waterworks with coal for the steam-powered pumps. Excursion trains ran on this branch line from 1911. The 90° left-hand curve was relocated to the east for the construction of barracks (later called the Sullivan Barracks) around 1936 and its heating plant was also connected. The connection was dismantled at the end of the 1950s.

Since an extension of the Mannheim–Weinheim line via Birkenau and Fürth to Reichelsheim connecting to the SEG's Reinheim–Reichelsheim Railway, which had been desired since the early days, could not be realised (the Weschnitz Valley Railway between Weinheim and Fürth was built to standard gauge), the route in Weinheim was moved in 1912, including the construction of an OEG bridge over the Main-Neckar Railway on 7 May. The old line ran straight from Stahlbad to the east – following the course of today's Breslauer Straße – to the freight yard, which it crossed by a bridge, then along Bergstraße to the north to the Pfälzer Hof inn (at the location of today's Stadthalle). The line was relocated to today's Stahlbadstraße and Mannheimer Straße for the new OEG bridge and the branch line running through Weschnitz from Bahnhofstrasse to Pfälzer Hof was dismantled.

=== Electrification ===
Electrification of the Käfertal–Viernheim–Weinheim line was completed on 2 September 1915 and the line was double-tracked at the same time. This was the first part of the OED network to be electrified. A fully zigzagged overhead catenary mounted on cross-beams was installed at that time. The electrification of this line also meant that the OEG supplied the town of Weinheim with electricity until 1934.

Simultaneously with the electrification, the lines in Mannheim were extended from the OEG station (Weinheimer Bahnhof) north of the Neckar over the urban tramway via Paradeplatz, Planken and Wasserturm (Water Tower) to the forecourt of Mannheim Hauptbahnhof.

After being delayed by the First World War, the planned electrification of the other lines was completed on 1 September 1956, allowing the continuous operation of electric railcars around the OEG ring.

=== Modernisation ===
Between 1970 and 1980, the local signal boxes were replaced by automatic block signaling. The line was then controlled by the signal box in Käfertal, which was put into operation in 1978.

In 1968, as part of the upgrade of the federal highway 38, the line in Viernheim was moved slightly to the southeast. Up to that time the line ran to Kiesstraße curving next to Mannheimer Straße then turned right–approximately following the course of a current road called Auf der Beune–crossed Heddesheimer Straße and then ran just off Ringstraße (now called Berliner Ring) to Viernheim OEG station. It thus ran largely on what was then the outskirts. The newly built line, on the other hand, swings away from Mannheimer Straße after Jahnstraße and runs past the former "beer cellar" and under the new Heddesheimer Straße bridge on an altered route to Viernheim OEG station. The community had negotiated for the line to be moved to this route as early as 1911, along with the construction of Berliner Ring on the same route.

The halt of Viernheim was moved as a result of this new construction from its previous location between Sandstraße and Kiesstraße to Jahnstraße. In 1972 it was transferred again to the west, however, this time to give access the newly opened Rhein-Neckar-Zentrum shopping mall. In the meantime, it was also renamed Tivoli, as it is adjacent to the Viernheim district of Tivoli. Kapellenberg station, which has since been built further to the northeast on the new route, is now close to the original halt of Viernheim.

The initial lines terminated in Mannheim at separate OEG stations on either side of the Neckar river near Kurpfalz bridge. In 1973, the line from Weinheim was extended over Friedrich-Ebert Bridge over the Neckar to Mannheim Hauptbahnhof and the Weinheimer station was closed. The grounds of the former station are now used for part of the Neckar promenade, completed in 2006, and a new tram line has been opened along Schafweide at almost the same location.

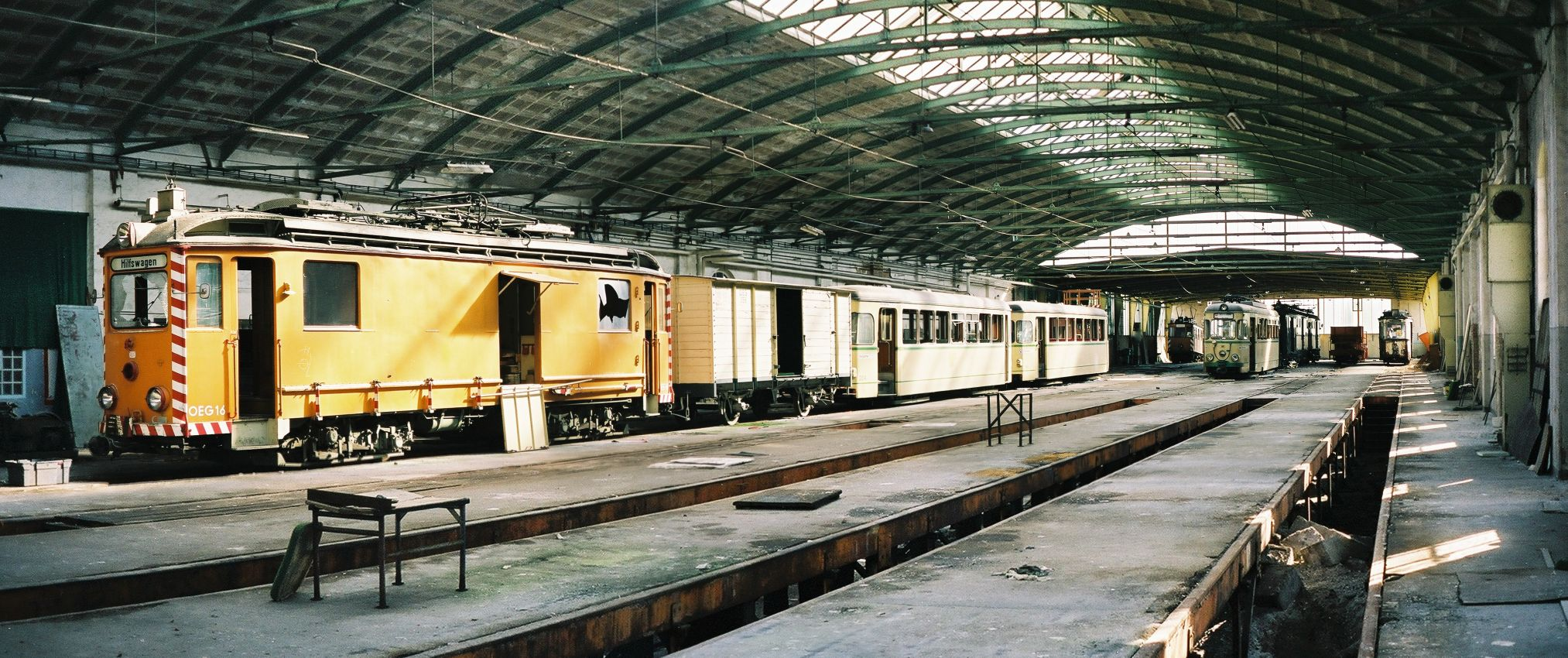
Stored dilapidated rolling stock in Viernheim carriage shed

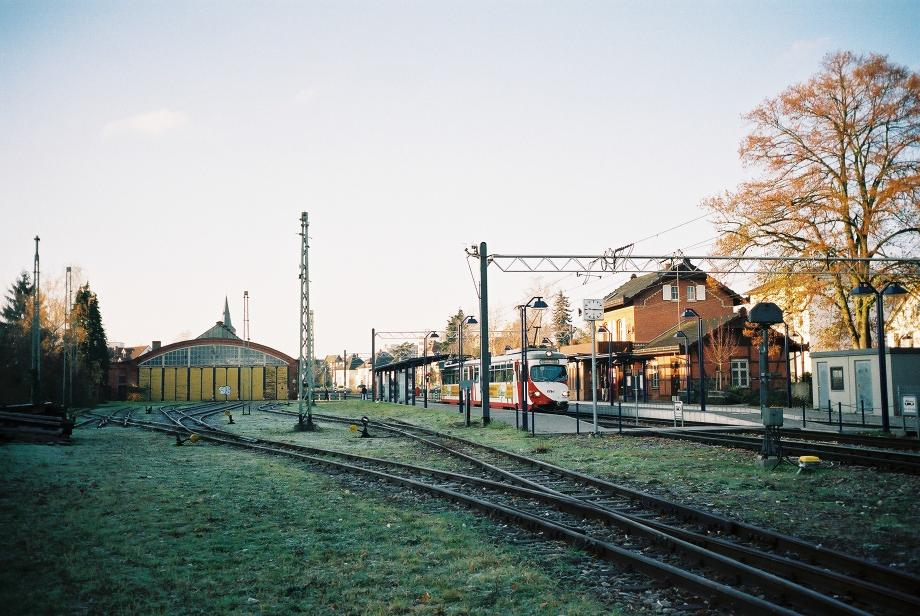
Viernheim OEG station and carriage shed

The carriage shed in Viernheim was closed on 1 July 1973. It became superfluous because the main workshop in Käfertal was dissolved due to the founding of the central transport workshop. Staff and vehicles were transferred from Viernheim to Käfertal. The Deutsche Gesellschaft für Eisenbahngeschichte (German Railway History Company, DGEG) operated a museum of narrow-gauge rolling stock on its grounds from 1976 to 1986. The listed building was in a poor state for a long time and was closed to the public after the removal of the historic OEG carriages. The sidings were removed, the sheds were cleaned up in 2008 and it was converted into an office complex in 2010.

By 1977 the railway tracks in Käfertal OEG station had been completely remodelled since at that time it was in the same condition that it had been when it was built before the First World War and therefore no longer met current requirements. A turning loop was built there.

In 1995, the concept of MVG 2000 was implemented that also brought big changes for the OEG. Up to this time, trains coming from Weinheim terminated in the forecourt of the Mannheim Hauptbahnhof and from Heidelberg in Mannheim Kurpfalz Bridge station (Bahnhof Mannheim Kurpfalzbrücke). The circuit was now closed with trains running through the centre of Mannheim. To achieve this, a short connecting line was built from the front of the Collini-Center, bypassing the Kurpfalz bridge station branch and connecting to the tram line on Friedrichsring. These connections were restorations; there had been similar links until 1928 and 1974 respectively. The OEG was connected to the Mannheim tram network and now ran with the line designation of 5R (and 5 for trains running only on the Käfertal–Mannheim–Edingen section).

=== RNV period ===
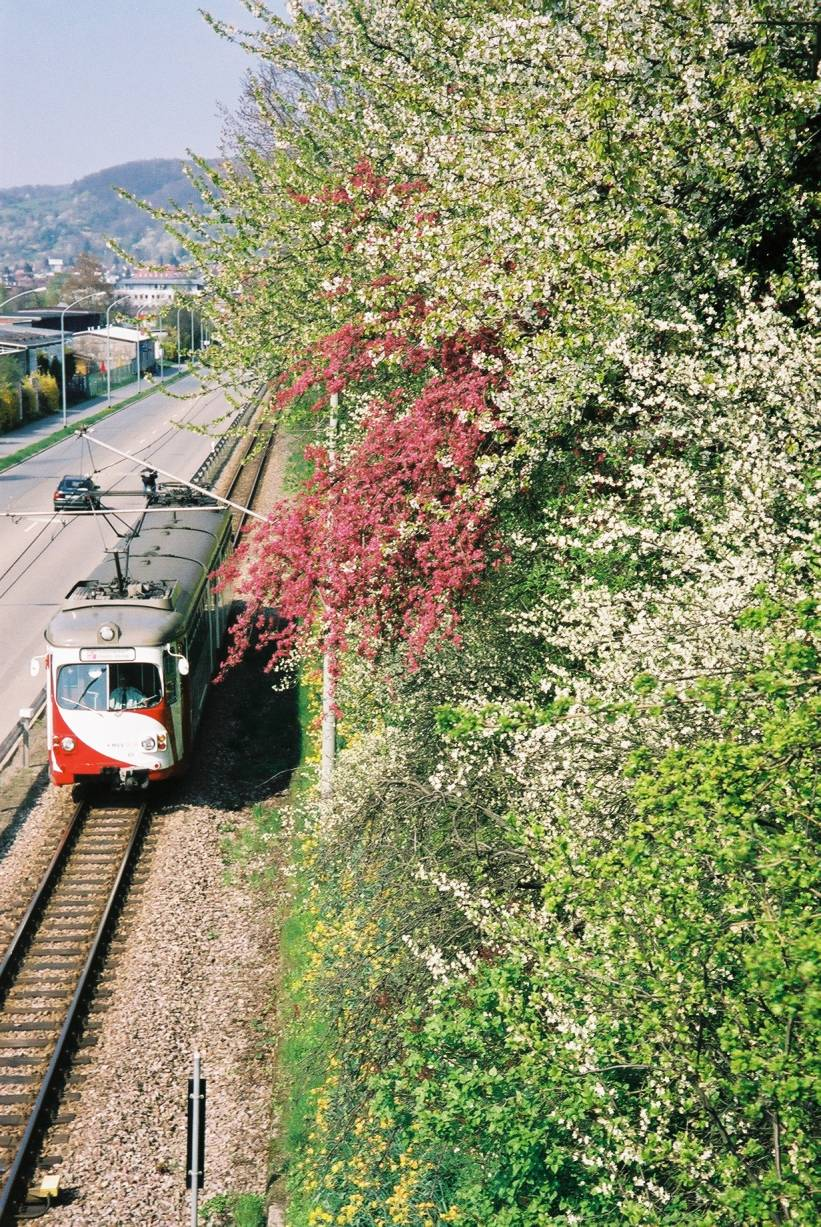
OEG train in Weinheim, near Rosenbrunnen station, before the double-track upgrade of the route along the mountain road (Bergstraße)

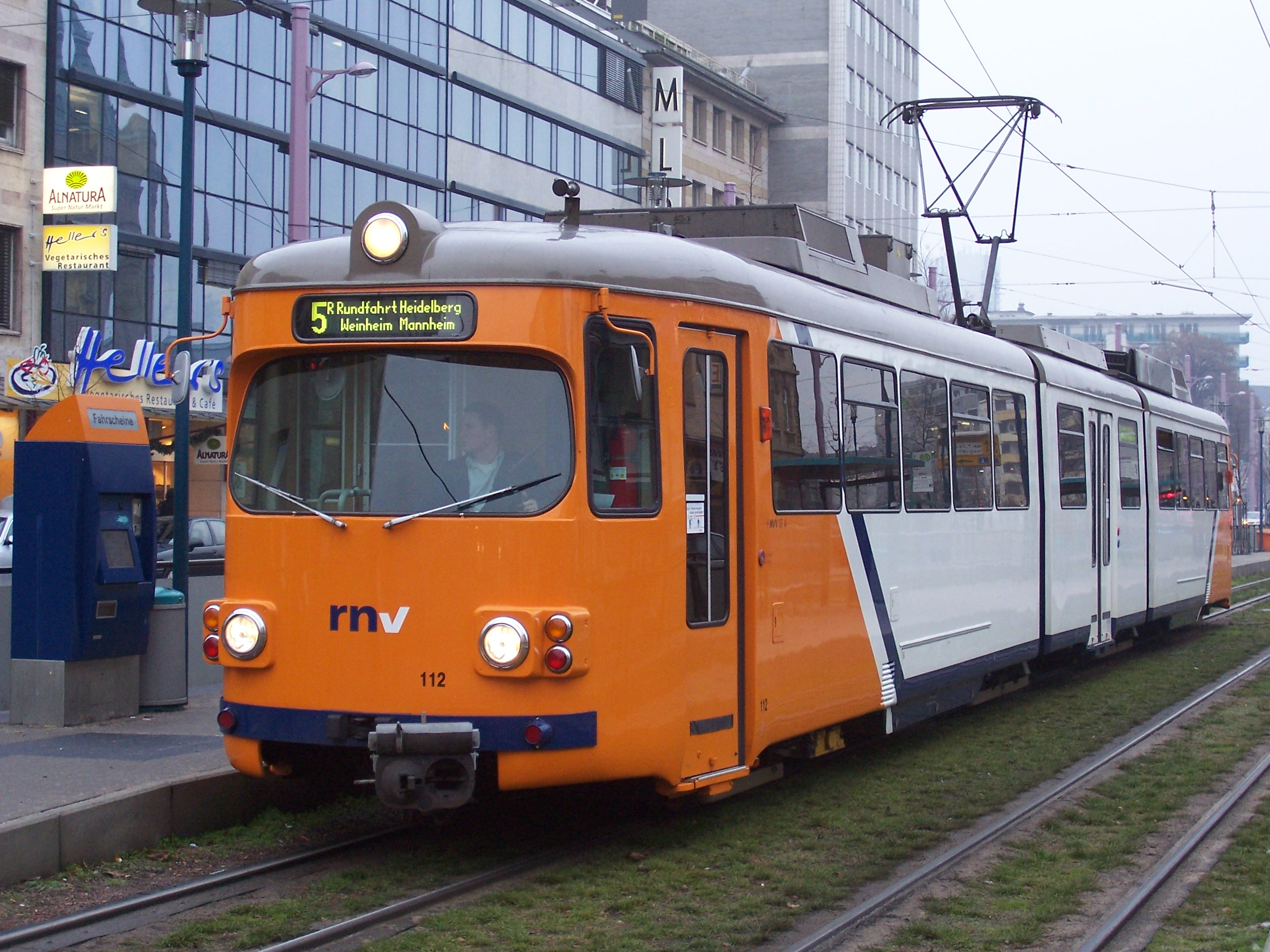
Car 112 in RNV livery

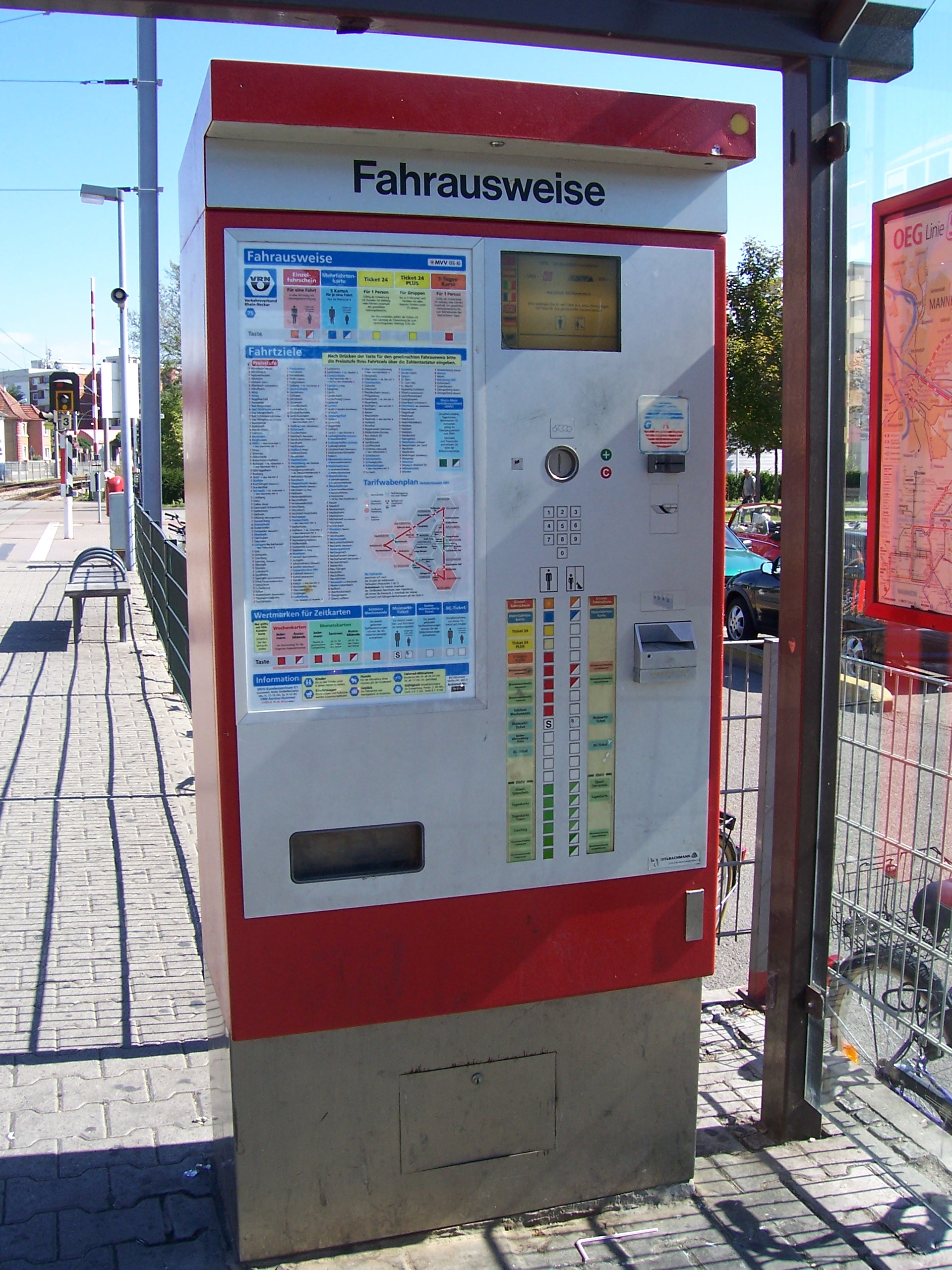
Ticket machine in Viernheim

Since the standardisation of line names of the Verkehrsverbund Rhein-Neckar (VRN) on 10 December 2006, the entire OEG route has been designated as line 5.

The control and safety technology of the line was renewed from March 2012. It is now controlled by means of an electronic signal centre from the operations centre in Möhlstraße depot in Mannheim. Between Universitätsklinikum and Mannheimer Straße the line is now operated according to the rules of Straßenbahn-Bau- und Betriebsordnung (BOStrab), which are designed for tram operations, although this section operates over railway infrastructure.

== Operating points ==
Renaming
Formerly	Now	Date
Viernheim Haltepunkt (halt)	Kapellenberg	1984
Käfertal Haltepunkt	Mannheimer Straße	1995
Gaswerk	Händelstraße	1998 (?)
Tivoli	Tivoli/Rhein-Neckar-Zentrum	
Käfertal Wald	Platz der Freundschaft	12 June 2016
Luisenstraße	Weinheim Hauptbahnhof	12 June 2016
Weinheim OEG-Bahnhof	Weinheim Alter OEG-Bahnhof	12 June 2016
Viernheim-Eissporthalle	Walter-Gropius-Allee	9 December 2018

== Operations ==
Originally passenger traffic on the line was operated as one of four independently operated OEG lines and was referred to as line A. The carriage shed was in Viernheim.

In the summer of 1922, trains ran from Weinheim to Bad Dürkheim.

The trains of line A ran hourly. On weekday mornings it operated at twenty, sometimes ten-minute intervals, and in the afternoons and evenings every half hour. On Sundays additional long-distance trains ran without stopping between Mannheim OEG station and Weinheim OEG station, along with additional hourly trains from Mannheim to Käfertal Wald.

Trains in Mannheim ended at the OEG station and no longer ran into the city centre from 6 September 1943 as a result of wartime bombing raids. Operations stopped due to the war from 26 March to 18 June 1945 and trains running from Weinheim to Handschuhsheim in Heidelberg could continue on the provisional Friedrich bridge to Bismarckplatz only from 21 November.

Trains ran every 24 minutes from 2 June 1957.

After the completion of electrification of the OEG Mannheim–Heidelberg–Weinheim–Mannheim triangular route in 1956, the two train services running to Weinheim were joined. Normal train services were also joined in Heidelberg from 30 May 1965, so that all trains now ran on round trips except for additional peak-hour services. A round trip took 122 minutes. Thus services ran on line A from Mannheim Hbf via Weinheim and Heidelberg to Mannheim Kurpfalzbrücke and on line C from Mannheim Hbf via Käfertal to Heddesheim over the Mannheim–Weinheim route.

Half-hourly services were introduced on 25 September 1966. A reduced timetable with less regular intervals was operated from 1 July 1971 to 31 June 1973. Thereafter, regular-interval trains every half hour were restored, with 20-minute intervals in the peak hours.

Services to Mannheim ran to the Hauptbahnhof again from 30 September 1973, but this time running over the Friedrich-Ebert bridge and the Kaiserring. As of 26 May 1974 the timing of the trains to/from Heddesheim was adjusted so that on the section used by two services, trains ran approximately every quarter of an hour.

Another half-hourly service was introduced on 23 May 1993, with additional trains between Weinheim and Mannheim. The top speed was increased from 60 km/h to 80 km/h.

In 1995, services to/from Weinheim and to/from Heidelberg were also joined in Mannheim. So the OEG trains have since run continuously around the ring, unless they reverse in Edingen/Schriesheim or Käfertal/Weinheim. The OEG reversing tracks on Schlossgartenstraße (at the Hauptbahnhof) were therefore no longer normally used. The trains running only on the Käfertal–Mannheim–Edingen section were designated as line 5, with the round trips designated as line 5^{R} and the line from Heddesheim via Mannheim to Ludwigshafen-Oggersheim designated as line 4. Line 5^{R} continued from Käfertal at 20-minute intervals (half-hourly on weekends); between Edingen and Käfertal additional services on line 5 mean that there are services every 10 minutes (on Sundays every 20 minutes).

In 1995, line number 62 was initially used for the complete circuit and 63 for the short services between Käfertal and Edingen, as the VRN envisaged taking a network-wide approach. However, as the MVV used the designation 5 to include the OEG line in its light rail network in Mannheim, it eventually renumbered the circuit route as 5^{R} (instead of 62) and the short services between Käfertal and Edingen as 5 (instead of 63). In the VRN's printed timetable, however, the timetable was listed under the table number "R 65". The distinction between 5 and 5^{R} was finally abandoned at the end of 2006 and since then only the designation 5 has been used, which is now also used in the printed timetable. The trains of the line to Heddesheim have run as lines 5A and 15 since June 2016.

The railway line connects the Hessian town of Viernheim to the rest of the railway network over state borders. On the festivals of the "Three Wise Men" (6 January) and "All Saints' Day" (1 November), which are public holidays in Baden-Württemberg only, there are fewer services between Mannheim and Weinheim. However, due to increased traffic to the Viernheim Rhein-Neckar-Zentrum shopping mall, most additional peak hour services operate on these days.
