= Rhein-Neckar-Verkehr =

Public transport

Logo of Rhein-Neckar-Verkehr

Rhein-Neckar-Verkehr GmbH (RNV, Rhine-Neckar Transport Ltd) is a company operating public transport (specifically bus and tram services) in the Rhine-Neckar region of Germany, including the cities of Heidelberg, Mannheim and Ludwigshafen am Rhein.

== History ==
RNV was established on 1 October 2004 as a joint subsidiary of the five principal public transport operators that had previously operated in the region:

- the Heidelberg Tramway (Heidelberger Straßen- und Bergbahn, HSB),
- MVV Transport (MVV Verkehr, the operator of trams and buses in Mannheim),
- the Upper Rhine Railway Company (Oberrheinische Eisenbahn, which became part of the MVV Group in the early 2000s and was then known as MVV OEG),
- the operator of the Rhine-Haardt Railway (Rhein-Haardt Bahn, RHB) and
- Verkehrsbetriebe Ludwigshafen (the operator of buses and trams in Ludwigshafen, VBL).

RNV is a public sector operation, as its ultimate beneficial owners are local authorities in the region.

Since 1 March 2005, RNV provides transport services on behalf of its parent companies. Fares are set by the local passenger transport executive, Verkehrsverbund Rhein-Neckar (VRN).

It commenced operations with a 188 kilometre network and 400 vehicles.
