= HSG =

HSG may refer to:

== Companies and organizations ==
- Health Systems Global, nonprofit organization
- High Sierra Group, CD-ROM standards body
- HSG (investment firm), Chinese venture capital firm

== Education ==
- High School for the Gifted, Ho Chi Minh City, Vietnam
- Hollywood School for Girls, Los Angeles, United States
- University of St. Gallen, Switzerland

== Transport ==
=== Air ===
- Hawker Siddeley Group, a British aircraft manufacturer
- Hesnes Air, a Norwegian airline
- Saga Airport, Japan

=== Rail ===
- BNR class HSG, a class of locomotives
- High-speed grinding, a track maintenance method
- Hira Singh railway station, Pakistan
- Hathersage railway station, England

== Other uses ==
- Handling stolen goods
- Hysterosalpingography, X-ray of the uterus and fallopian tubes
