= Upper Rhine Railway Company =

German railway infrastructure and transport company

MVV OEG AG

Overview
- Owner: MVV GmbH city of Mannheim city of Heidelberg city of Weinheim
- Number of stations: 55
- Headquarters: Mannheim

Technical
- Track gauge: 1,000 mm (3 ft 3 3/8 in) metre gauge
- Minimum radius of curvature: 23 m (75 ft)
- Electrification: 750 V DC overhead catenary
- Top speed: 80 km/h (50 mph)

The Upper Rhine Railway Company (Oberrheinische Eisenbahn-Gesellschaft Aktiengesellschaft Mannheim; OEG, originally also OEG AG, later MVV OEG AG), was a railway infrastructure company and transport company based in Mannheim, Germany.

Its principal business was the operation of a metre-gauge railway serving Mannheim, Heidelberg and Weinheim. The company was merged with MVV Verkehr AG (the Mannheim municipal transport company) on 16 March 2010, and its network is now served by Rhein-Neckar-Verkehr.

Until December 2009, the OEG also operated municipal buses in Weinheim, some bus routes in the southeast of Mannheim and several other bus routes in the vicinity of Schriesheim and Ladenburg.

== History ==
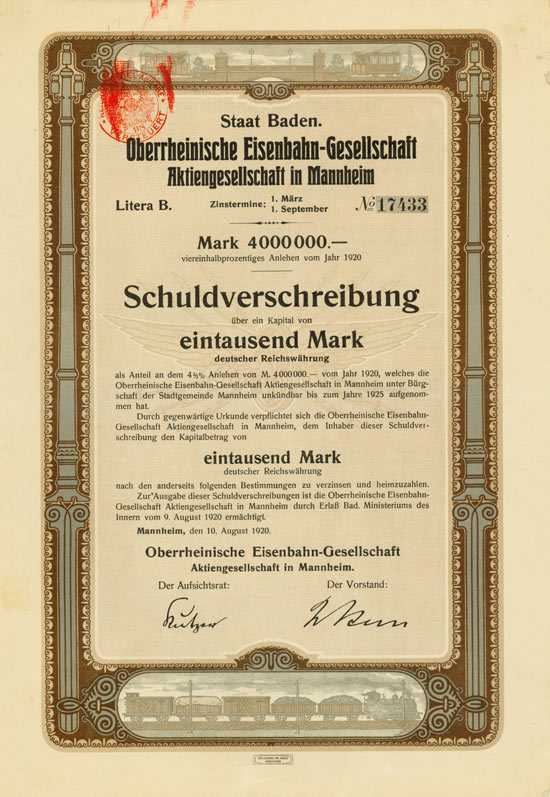
Debenture with a face value of 1000 marks of the Upper Rhine Railway Company AG issued on 10 August 1920

After the death of Hermann Bachstein in 1908, the Rhenish industrialist Hugo Stinnes took over the majority of SEG in 1909 with the aim of taking control of the electric tramways of the Ruhr and other major cities as part of the RWE (Rheinisch-Westfälisches Elektrizitätswerk AG) power company so that they could be connected to the electric grid of western Germany. In order to focus on electric trams, a few railways were spun off the SEG and transferred to newly established companies.

In order to carry out the electrification of the line and to allow the expansion of its tram network, the city of Mannheim in cooperation with the SEG, which had acquired the Mannheim-Weinheim-Heidelberg-Mannheim railway, founded the Oberrheinische Eisenbahn-Gesellschaft AG (OEG) in 1911. In order to prevent domination by the RWE, the city of Mannheim held a majority of the shares of the company. The Schwetzingen–Ketsch Tramway (Straßenbahn Schwetzingen–Ketsch) and two power plants in Ladenburg and Rheinau were acquired by the OEG. 51% of the share capital was held by the city of Mannheim and 26% by the SEG. The rest was accounted for by three other shareholders. The OEG took over the operation of the lines on 1 April 1911.

To mitigate financial problems after the First World War, the city of Mannheim took over the railways from the OEG, while the company (with retained power plants and electric distribution) remained in the hands of Stinnes and was renamed Kraftwerke Rheinau.

The now independent company of Oberrheinische Eisenbahngesellschaft was established by the cities of Mannheim, Heidelberg, Weinheim, Viernheim and the Rhein-Haardtbahn GmbH (Rhine-Haardt Railway, builder of the Bad Dürkheim–Ludwigshafen-Oggersheim railway). The city of Mannheim contributed the railway of the former OEG to the new company.

The OEG tram line from Neckarau to Rheinau (then called Rhenaniastraße) was opened in 1913. At the time of the line's construction, Rheinau was not yet incorporated in Mannheim and was therefore in the jurisdiction of the OEG according to the existing cooperation agreements. This changed with its incorporation in Mannheim in 1913, so the line was then used by the city's tramway and it passed into its possession in 1921.

In 1914, the first section of the Mannheim–Feudenheim–Ilvesheim–Ladenburg–Schriesheim line was opened to Feudenheim for temporary freight traffic. In addition, the line was operated for two months by the city's tram services, prior to the commencement of OEG operations. Land on the adjacent section had been purchased and works had commenced (including on bridges) on the remaining route, but work had to be abandoned because of the First World War. Since the construction could not be completed even after the war for economic reasons, the OEG began operating its first bus line on the route in 1925. It was intended to be temporary, awaiting the finishing of the line, but it has continued to this day. The freight traffic to Freudenheim was abandoned along with the line in the late 1920s.

Like most transport companies in Germany, the OEG had a huge increase in ridership after the war to cope with, especially in 1945 when only half of its fleet was available. In 1947 patronage reached a peak of 25.6 million passengers. One of the reasons for the increase was the phenomenon of so-called "foraging trips", when cheap fares encouraged people to barter for food with farmers. Ridership returned to normal after the currency reform of 1948.

After overcoming the post-war difficulties, the OEG had to deal with incipient mass motorisation. Its goal was to become faster and more convenient in order to hang on to patronage. A first step was the purchase of four open coaches, together with trailer carriages from Waggonfabrik Fuchs.

About 1960, it began improving the technical safety of level crossings with flashing lights, which were later augmented with half-barriers. In 1964, the OEG operated 142 km of tracks and carried more than 50,000 passengers daily.

Train radio was introduced in 1976.

The funding of the OEG's losses were revised in 1996. Mannheim now funds 58.2%, Rhein-Neckar-Kreis 30%, Heidelberg 7.2% and Viernheim 4.6% of the losses occurring every year. Until then, the city of Heidelberg had paid nothing at all.

In addition, in 1996, Weinheimer Busunternehmen GmbH (Weinheim Bus Company, WEBU) was established, owned by Stadtwerke Weinheim GmbH (the Weinheim municipal utility, 71.6%) and OEG (28.4%), that has since managed Weinheim city buses. OEG continued to operate bus services for WEBU until 31 December 2009.

In 2000, MVV GmbH acquired a 94.6% share of the OEG from the city of Mannheim and the company was renamed MVV OEG AG. 5.18% remains directly owned by the city of Mannheim, 0.2% by the City of Heidelberg and 0.02% by the City of Weinheim. Since 2002, the OEG network has been operated together with the Mannheim trams of MVV Verkehr AG.

Rhine-Neckar Transport (Rhein-Neckar-Verkehr GmbH, RNV), which is jointly owned by MVV OEG AG, MVV Verkehr AG, Straßenbahn Heidelberg, Verkehrsbetriebe Ludwigshafen and Rhein-Haardtbahn, was founded on 1 October 2004 and it has carried out joint operations since 1 March 2005. The infrastructure and the concessions remain with the OEG, but the rolling stock were transferred to RNV and are considered to form part of the capital contribution to RNV, which now provides transport services on behalf of the OEG. Since 2005, responsibility for funding losses incurred has been allocated to the respective districts of Mannheim, Heidelberg, Viernheim and the Rhein-Neckar-Kreis in proportion to net-kilometres operated. The council of the city of Mannheim decided to merge MVV OEG AG and MVV Verkehr AG in 2009. After acquiring the remaining 0.22% of shares from Heidelberg and Weinheim, Mannheim now holds 100% of the shares. The merger was finalised on 16 March 2010 with the deletion of MVV OEG AG from the share company register. As a next step, MVV Verkehr AG became a limited liability company on 31 March 2011. The company was renamed MV Mannheimer Verkehr GmbH on 2 January 2018.

== Operated routes ==
The Upper Rhine Railway Company operated the following routes:

- Mannheim–Weinheim railway
- Weinheim–Heidelberg railway
- Mannheim Kurpfalzbrücke–Edingen–Heidelberg railway
- Mannheim-Käfertal–Heddesheim railway
- Mannheim-Seckenheim–Neckarhausen–Edingen (Baden) railway
- Heidelberg-Güterbahnhof OEG–Dossenheim–Schriesheim railway

== Rolling stock ==
=== Steam era ===
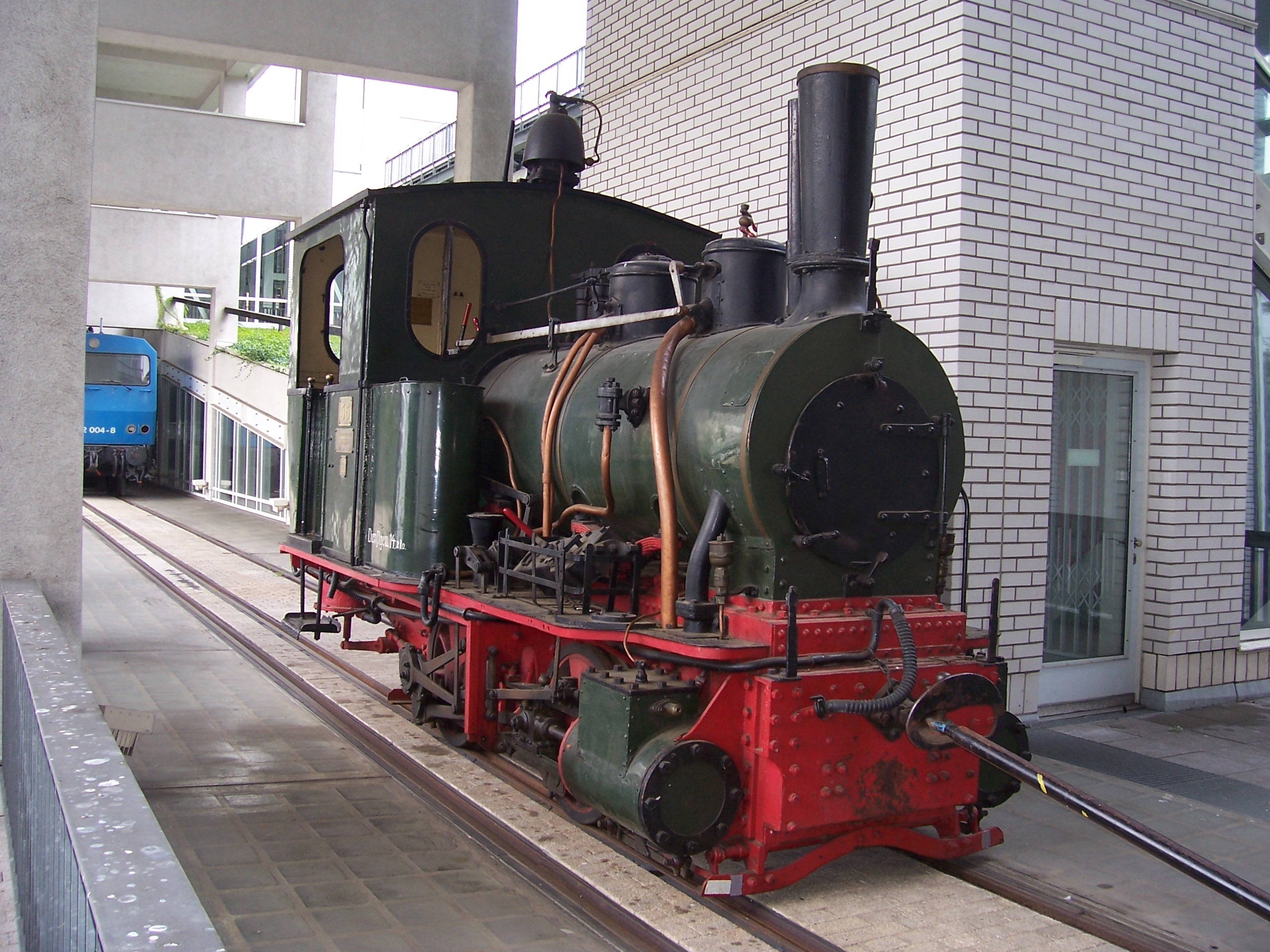
OEG steam locomotive 56, built in 1886, in Technoseum Mannheim

Trains were operated on the initially non-electrified lines using small two-axle steam locomotives (some disguised as tram engines) hauling rail carriages. Steam locomotives 56 and 102 are now part of the collection of the Technoseum Mannheim, although only locomotive 56 is publicly exhibited. Locomotive 101 ended up after several intermediate points at the Selfkantbahn, where it is operated as locomotive MEG 101.

Furthermore, some passenger cars and numerous freight wagons have been preserved at, for example, DEV Bruchhausen-Vilsen, the Selfkantbahn, the Märkische Museum Railway at Plettenberg, the Albbähnle (Amstetten–Oppingen) and the Härtsfeld-Museumsbahn in Neresheim.

The OEG operated two locomotives similar to the T 3, locomotives 341 and 342, on the standard gauge line to Schriesheim.

=== Diesel locomotives ===
The OEG procured three diesel locomotives for metre gauge (designated as 01 to 03) and a diesel locomotive for standard gauge (no. 04) from the manufacturer Gmeinder to replace steam locomotives from 1953. The two-axle locomotives were technically similar to the Köf II of DB, but were constructed differently. Until the electrification of the Weinheim–Schriesheim section, the metre-gauge locomotives also hauled passenger trains. Later, like their standard-gauge sister locomotive, they were only used for freight and construction traffic. Another diesel locomotive was put into service to replace the last steam locomotive in 1967 as no. 05, which technically and visually had many similarities with a Köf III. With the closing of the standard-gauge freight line in 1973, the first diesel locomotives, 04 and 05, were sold. With the decline in freight traffic and the loss of general freight (small consignments) to trucks, it could later do without the two metre-gauge locomotives and it sold locomotive 01 to Essener Verkehrs-AG (the Essen municipal transport company—now part of Ruhrbahn—which renumbered it 601) and the locomotive 03 to the Rhein-Haardtbahn (renumbered V01). Locomotive 02 was renumbered 350 with the introduction of engineering vehicle numbers in the early 1990s. It is still in service today and is sometimes used as an engineering vehicle or an auxiliary locomotive.

=== Electric shunting locomotive ===
The OEG acquired a small two-axle locomotive with a box body, no. 50, from the Nederlandsche Buurtspoorweg-Maatschappij in 1952. The previous owner had converted the locomotive from a steam tram engine, but it had become redundant as a result of the closure of the tramway between Utrecht and Zeist in 1949. The overall condition of the locomotive turned out to be so bad that the OED had to scrap and rebuild it. Unly the AEG engines, the scrapped locomotive's maximum current switch and wheelsets could be reused in the rebuild. The locomotive's remaining electrical equipment came from spare parts taken from "half trains" (Halbzüge). The locomotive was used for shunting in the main workshop and later in Käfertal depot and was never used in route service. It had the company number of 103 (following the numbers of the steam locomotives), later 05 (following the numbers of the diesel locomotives) and was redesignated as number 06 after the acquisition of diesel locomotive 05. With the introduction of the engineering vehicle numbers, it was given the company number 351. It has now been painted back to the original grey colour and is still operational.

=== First electric railcar ===
For the start of electrical operations on the Mannheim–Weinheim line in 1914, the OEG procured electric motor coaches in Heidelberg (number 1 to 18) from Waggonfabrik Fuchs plus 27 tram-like two-axle trailer cars (no. 201 to 227). They were used in trains of up to eight passenger cars. Towards the end of the 1950s, the bodies of railcars 4 and 17 were rebuilt in the form of the then current vehicles by Waggonfabrik Rastatt, but leaving the electrical equipment largely unchanged. The conversions were not successful and were therefore discontinued. Operations of the first series of railcars ended with the introduction of articulated vehicles in the 1960s. Individual cars were converted into engineering vehicles. TW 2 and Tw 16 (which has been converted to an auxiliary car) are still available in a poor condition.

=== Half trains ===
21 "half-trains" (Halbzüge) were delivered as part of the electrification of the Mannheim–Heidelberg line in 1928. The half-trains were each composed of a four-axle railcar and a similar four-axle control car, which were firmly connected by a close coupling. There was a passage between the cars for the conductor. They carried the operating numbers 21/22 to 61/62 and had 29 seats per car. For flexible train formation, it was possible to couple two half-trains to a block train and to control both railcars of this train from a driver's cab. The half-trains operated in service until 2 March 1974.

Half-train 45/46 was preserved and was rebuilt in 1990 as a saloon car, which can now be rented for special trips; half-train 47/48 is used as a source of spare parts. Set 27/28 was preserved as a half train in the Hannoversches Straßenbahn-Museum and serves as an example of the smooth transition from tramway to railway.

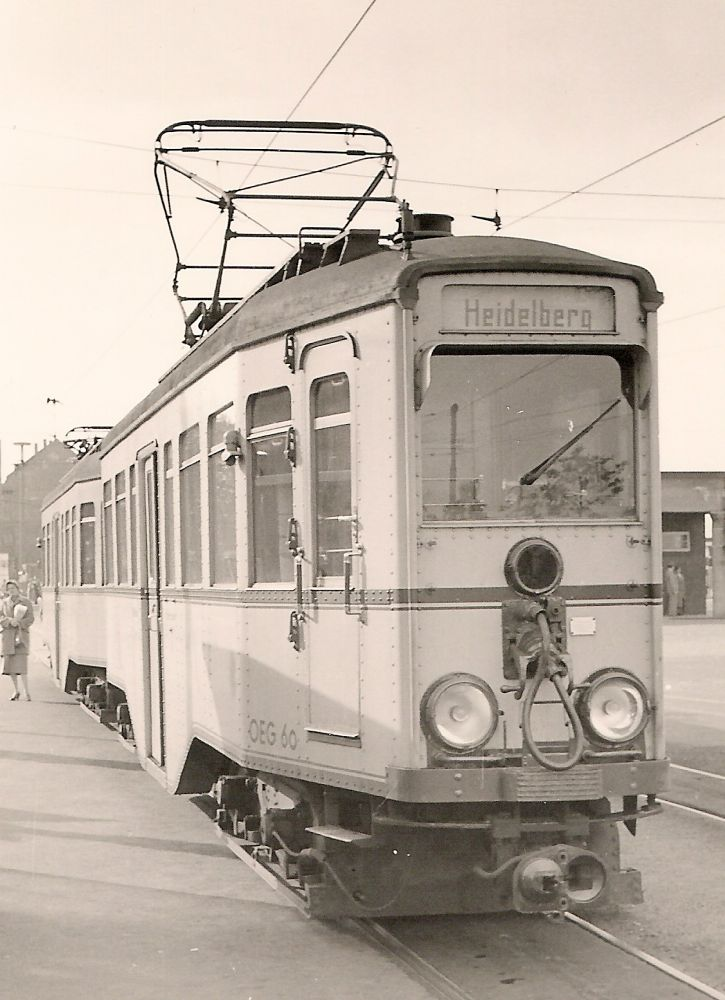
OEG half train 59/60 in September 1957

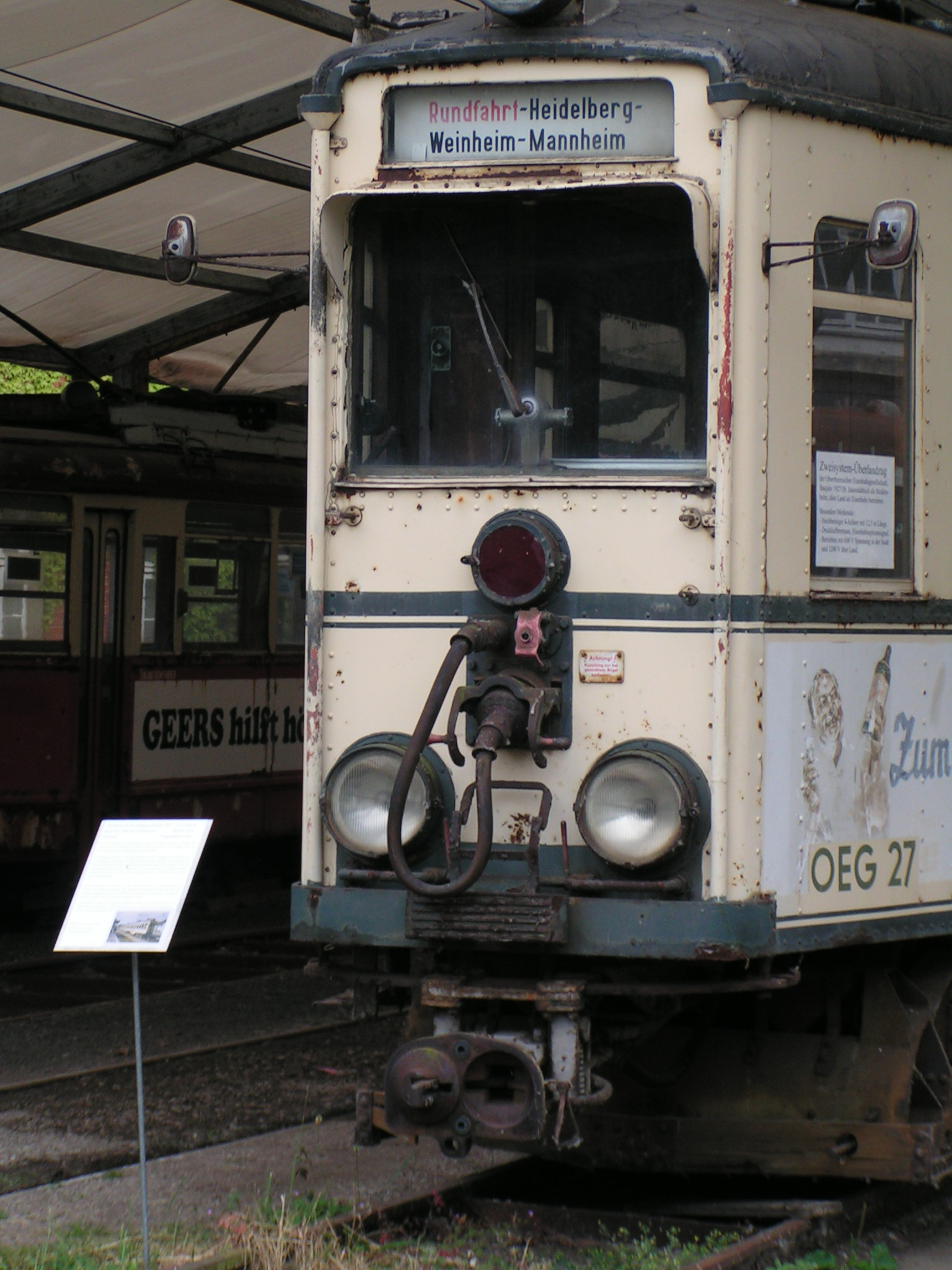
OEG carriage 27 in Wehmingen tram museum

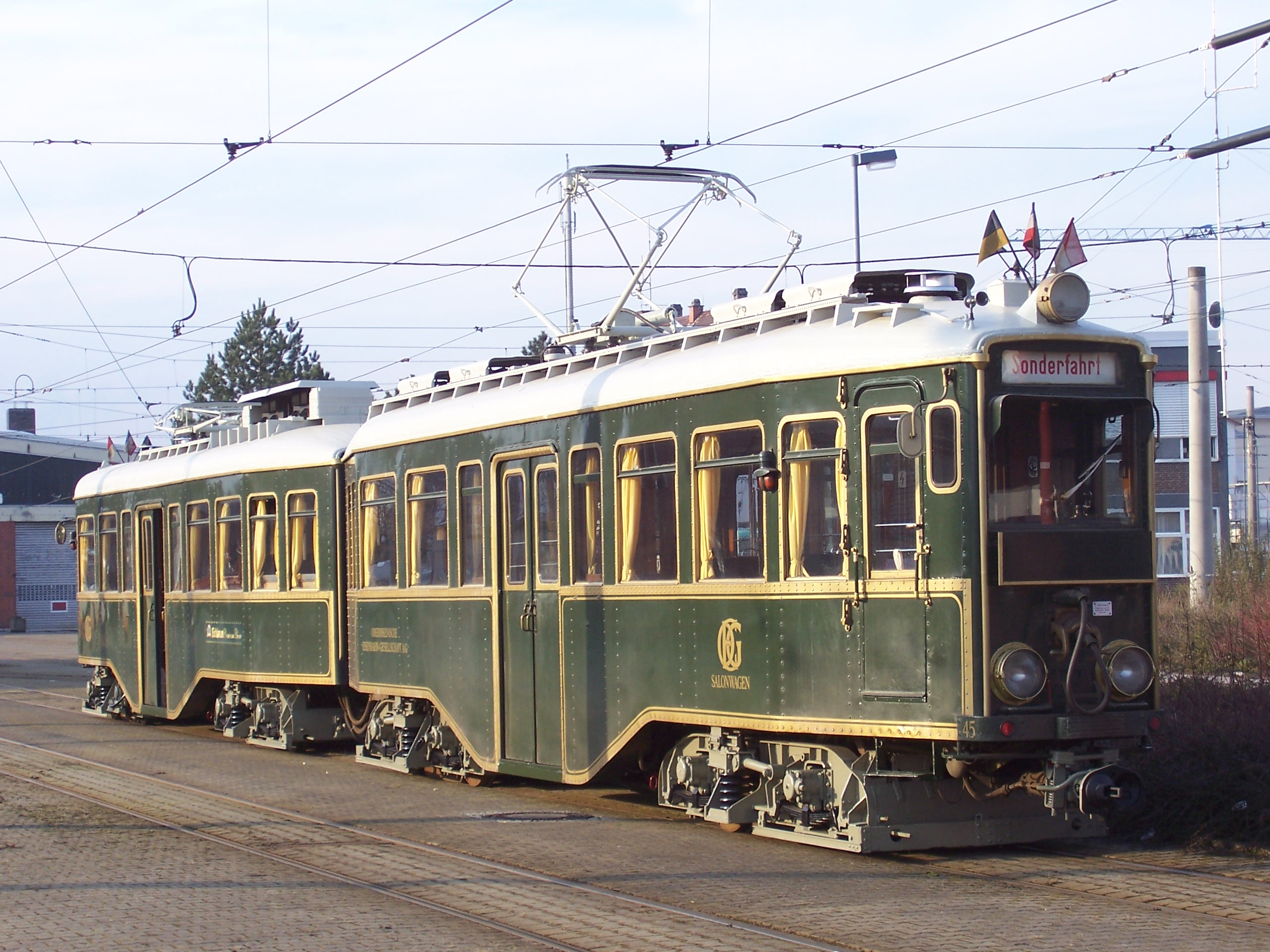
Historic half-train 45/46 in Käfertal

=== Rail freight wagons ===
Technically largely identical to the half trains, electric freight wagons, numbered 19 and 20, were also acquired in 1928. These were occasionally used for passenger services. A motor coach built in 1915 and damaged in the Second World War was converted into a third motor freight wagon in 1948 and was given the number 18. Freight wagon 19 was rebuilt in the 1960s as a railgrinder and remained in use until 1997; in its last years it was only hauled. Freight wagon 18 is out of service and classified as a historic vehicle.

=== Fuchs railcar ===
Fuchs railcars
- Manufacturer: Waggonfabrik Fuchs
- Family name: Spitzmaus
- Number built: 8 motor cars, 15 trailer cars

Specifications
- Car length: 13.7 m (45 ft)
- Width: 2.2 m (7.2 ft)
- Weight: 2 t (2.2 short tons)
- Prime mover: GBM 60
- Engine type: Nose-suspended traction motor
- Power output: 4 × 60 kW
- UIC classification: Bo’Bo’
- Seating: 34

The last vehicles produced by Fuchs consisted of a total of eight electric railcars, along with fifteen matching trailer cars delivered in 1952 (some trailer cars had been delivered in 1951) and 1957. The motor coaches of the first series delivered bore the company numbers of 63 to 66 and the second series was numbered 67 to 70 (the trailer cars were numbered 140 to 144 and 145 to 154). Because of the tapering vehicle ends, they were called Spitzmäuse (shrews); the vehicles of the first series had a much sharper shape than those of the second series. The railcars were used until the mid-1970s, but not being equipped with magnetic rail brakes, they were then retired. The trailer cars had been stored in 1969 because of their rocky running. Wagons 63, 65 and 68 were sold to the Meiringen–Innertkirchen Railway (Meiringen-Innertkirchen-Bahn; MIB) in Switzerland in 1978. There wagons 63 and 65 were equipped with an additional petrol engine and put in operation as Bem 4/4 number 6 and 7. Railcar 68 was used by the MIB for sourcing spare parts and then scrapped. Carriage 66 was taken out of service with the OEG in 1977 and operated as a historical vehicle by volunteers until 2007. The end of rolling stock production by Waggonfabrik Fuchs meant that all of the later vehicles were purchased from other manufacturers.

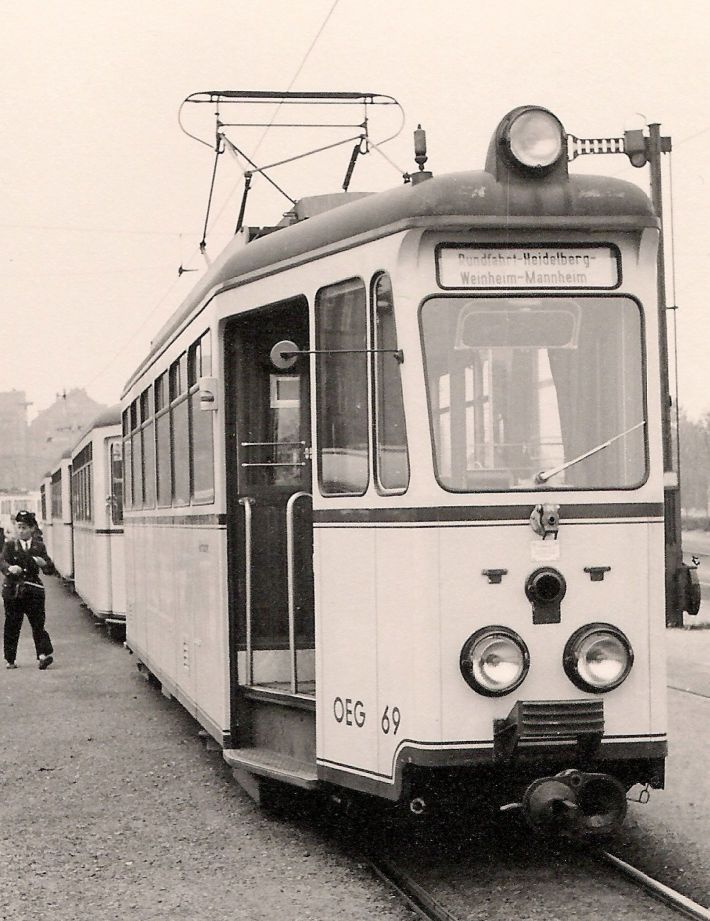
OEG railcar 69 in September 1957

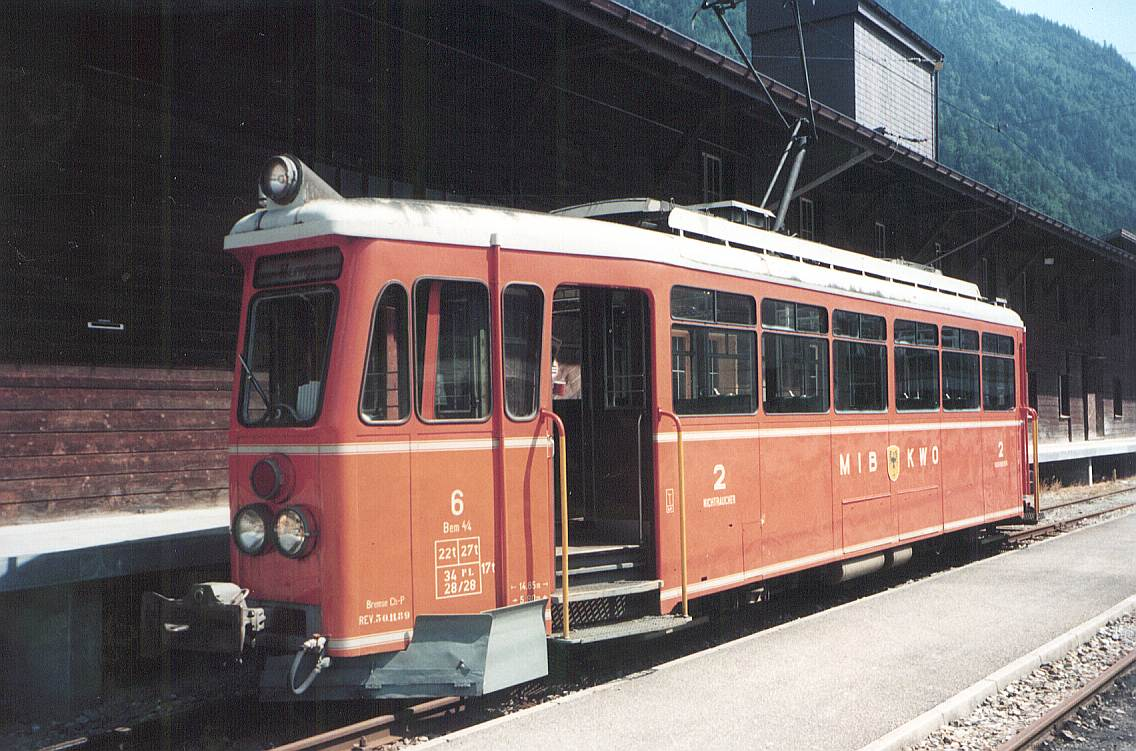
MIB Bem 6, formerly OEG railcar 63

=== T4 Rastatt ===
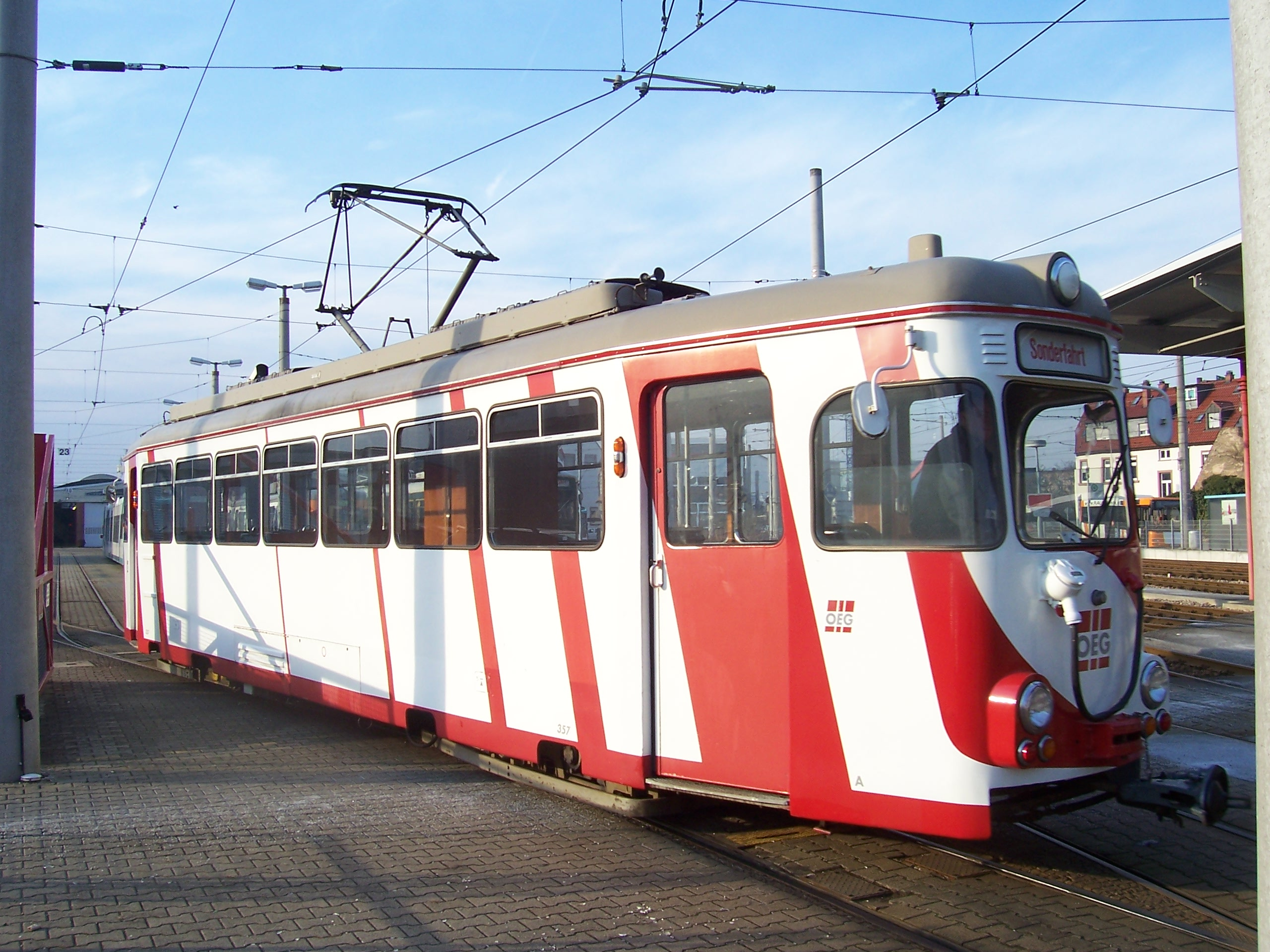
Engineering vehicle 357, formerly T4 number 76

Waggonfabrik Rastatt delivered a total of seven four-axle large-capacity motor cars of class T4 in 1958 (number 71 to 73), 1960 (number 74) and 1963 (number 75 to 77). It delivered 46 trailer cars (number 165 to 210) matching the motor cars. Some vehicles of this type were equipped in the first half of the 1970s with magnetic rail brakes and low voltage systems, brake lights, turn signals and validators, and later also inductive point control and the Punktförmige Zugbeeinflussung (Indusi) train control system was installed. They were used in passenger transport until 1989, most recently only in the morning school traffic. Some of the motor cars were rebuilt as engineering vehicles and are still used today, although cars 72 and 74 have been scrapped. Only a few of the trailer cars have been preserved. Motor car 71 and trailer car 193 have been returned to their original finish since 2007, as well as motor car 77 since 2010.

=== Gt8 Rastatt ===
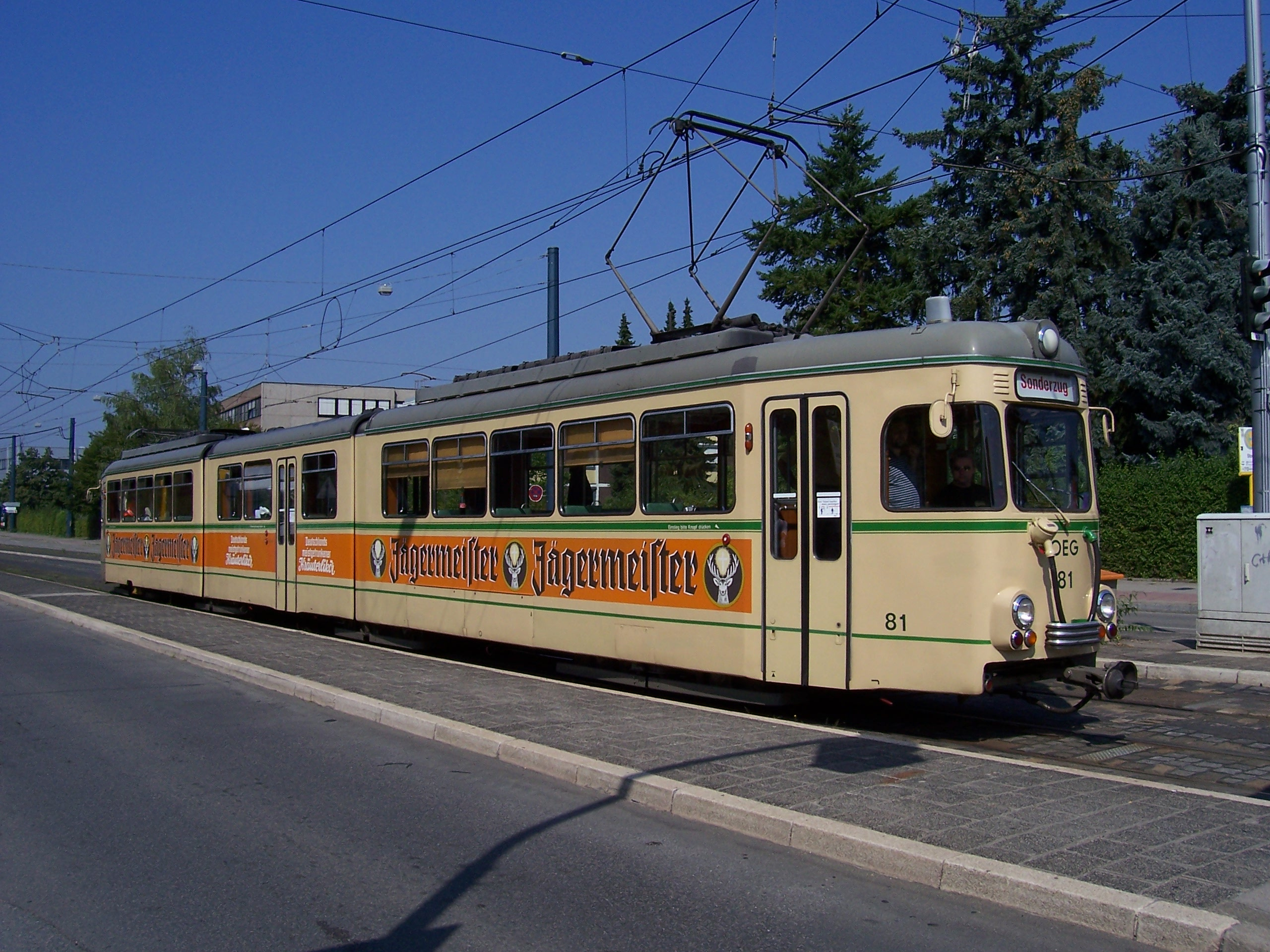
Car 81 with old livery on a special trip

Waggonfabrik Rastatt delivered two eight-axle articulated trams in 1960 (no. 80) and 1963 (no. 81). Car 80 originally ran as no. 75, with the subsequent delivery of large-capacity car no. 75, it was renumbered 85 and a short time later 80. The car remained unique and were subjected to multiple modifications over time (gearboxes, doors, pantographs, validators, Indusi, signalling control). They were mainly used between 1983 and 1997 for school traffic between Edingen and Mannheim Kurpfalzbrücke, where the two articulated trams used were usually coupled. The rear car ran without power. In the summer of 1991, the cars were operated on trial on the OEG circuit on Sundays and public holidays with the adapted trailer cars 193 and 205 on a scheduled circulation called the OEG-Fahrradexpress (cycle express). Car 80 was stored in 1998 and has now been scrapped. Car 81 served as a reserve vehicle until 2007. It underwent a major inspection in the spring of 2010 and its interior was remodeled with a counter, curtains and small tables. It has been back in operation as a party car since March 2010 covered in dark green plastic. Following a public competition, the car was given the name of Sixty (a nostalgic reference to the 1960s) in the spring of 2011.

=== Gt8 Duewag ===
Duewag Gt8/Gt8K
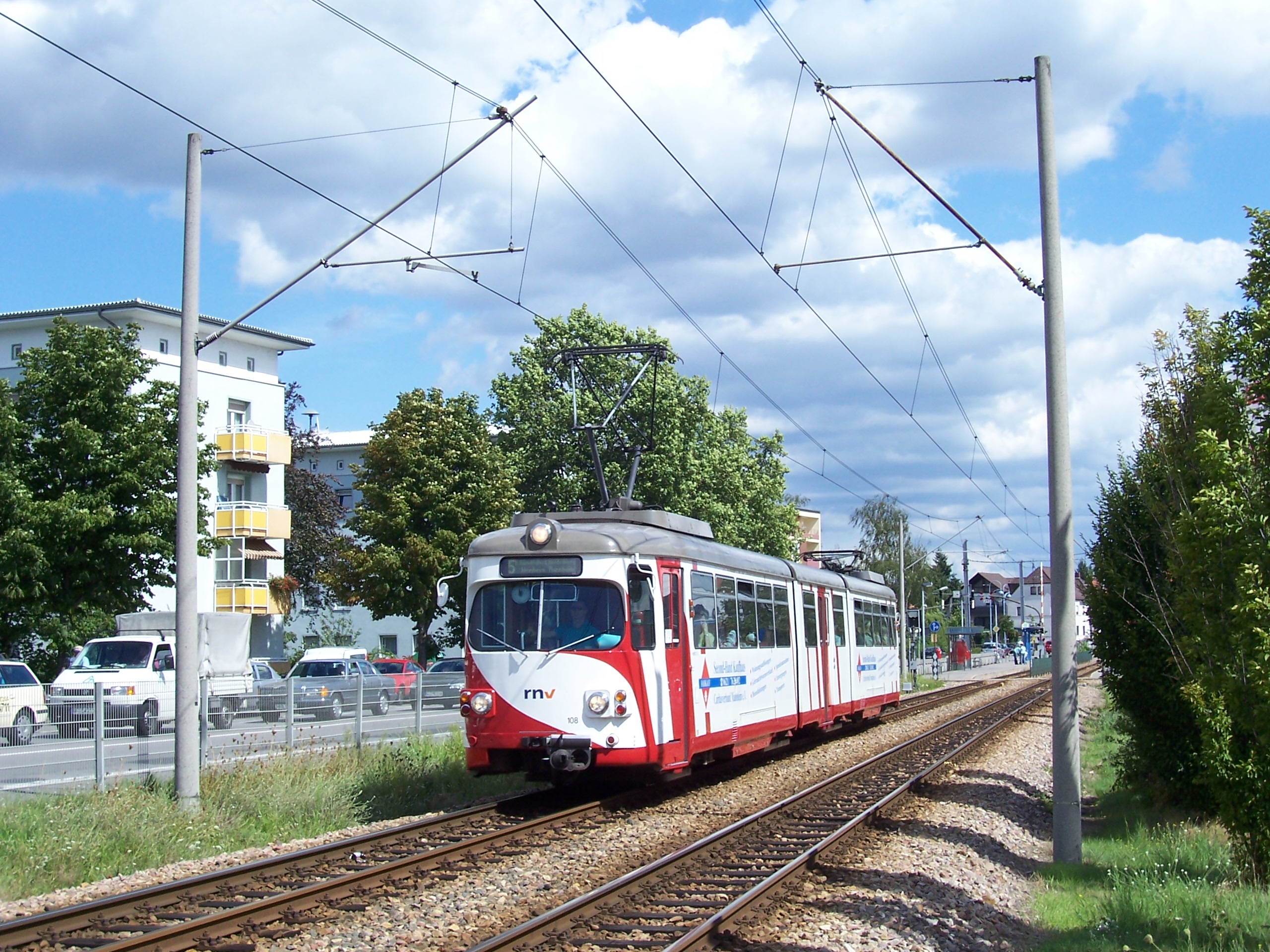
- Gt8 in red and white colour scheme
- Fleet numbers: 82–116

Specifications
- Car length: 27.5 m (90 ft)
- Width: 2.5 m (8.2 ft)
- Maximum speed: 80 km/h (50 mph)
- Track gauge: 1,000 mm (3 ft 3 3/8 in) metre gauge

Duewag delivered eight eight-axle articulated railcars (no. 82 to 89) from 1966. These were operated from November 1966 and in coupled sets from 28 May 1967. The Düwag vehicles differed significantly from the existing Rastatt articulated railcars. The railcars were much larger with a width of 2.50 m and had an electronic control panel control of the Simatic type, which could also be used to drive the train. The haulage of trailer cars was therefore no longer possible, so an air brake system was not needed. Electric door operation and regenerative braking were used.

More deliveries followed with small structural changes: the eight railcars built in 1969 (numbers 90 to 97) were largely similar to the cars from 1966. The 13 railcars (98 to 110) supplied in 1973/1974 were no longer equipped with partitions, luggage nets and blinds on the windows and were not designed for 750 volt contact wire tension only as built. Electro-hydraulic spring-loaded brakes served for the first time as holding brakes; these were also retrofitted to the previous series. The cab was scaled down to allow a second door leaf in the right front entry.

The fourth and final series, six railcars with the numbers 111–116, were delivered in 1988/1989. The cars were designed for the retrofitting of air conditioning, this was installed from 1994. They also did not have double leaf doors on the front right. The cars were delivered in white livery and painted before commissioning as the first OEG rail vehicles to have the then new, red and white colour scheme. They are easy to distinguish from the previous series of cars by their tinted windows, extended door windows and their pantographs, which were mounted in the centre of the vehicle.

The Duewag Gt8 sets of the different builds could be coupled with each other by means of Scharfenberg couplers to form train assemblies. Until the 1990s, however, the second vehicle was usually occupied by a train driver. The vehicles of the fourth build were first used in sets without a second driver on 4 November 1996; this is now normal practice.

Two to three eight-axle articulated railcars of the OEG (usually number 82, 85 and 87) were leased to the Heidelberg tramway from October 2007 to May 2009. They were temporarily operated on line 21.

The Gt8 dominated the appearance of the OEG for decades and have been continually modernised over the years (one-man operation, spring brakes, driver's desks, passenger seats, microprocessor-monitored control panel controls, exterior and interior lighting, outdoor LCD destination displays, indoor stop displays, colour scheme, automatic vehicle location system). Since the turn of the millennium, individual vehicles have been scrapped after the accessibility-regulation deadline (83–88, 90–93, 96, 97) or after accidents (89, 94, 95, 102, 105, 112). After commissioning of the last RNV6 series, all remaining cars of the third series, with the exception of car 110, were decommissioned in the summer of 2013. At the beginning of February 2015, cars 98 and 100 were restored to service, the others (99, 101, 103, 104, 106–109) were scrapped in the spring of 2019 after a long period of inactivity. At the beginning of 2019, cars 82, 98, 100, 110, 111 and 113–116 are still operational. The use is limited now to morning student traffic (mostly in double sets) and to meet unscheduled needs.

=== Gt6 from Bielefeld ===
Due to increased passenger traffic and the resulting lack of rolling stock, the OEG acquired four used six-axle Duewag articulated rail cars (301 to 304) with matching four-axle trailer cars (311 to 314) in 1982 from Bielefeld (built in 1962). Since these were one-directional vehicles, they could not be used on the circuit, but only operated on the Mannheim Hbf–Käfertal–Heddesheim line, since there were turning loops only at the end points. Using the Bielefeld sets between Mannheim and Heddesheim, released Gt8 sets for use on the circuit.

The vehicles were retired in 1991/1993 and sold to the Arad Tramway in Romania in 1998.

=== Variobahn V6 ===
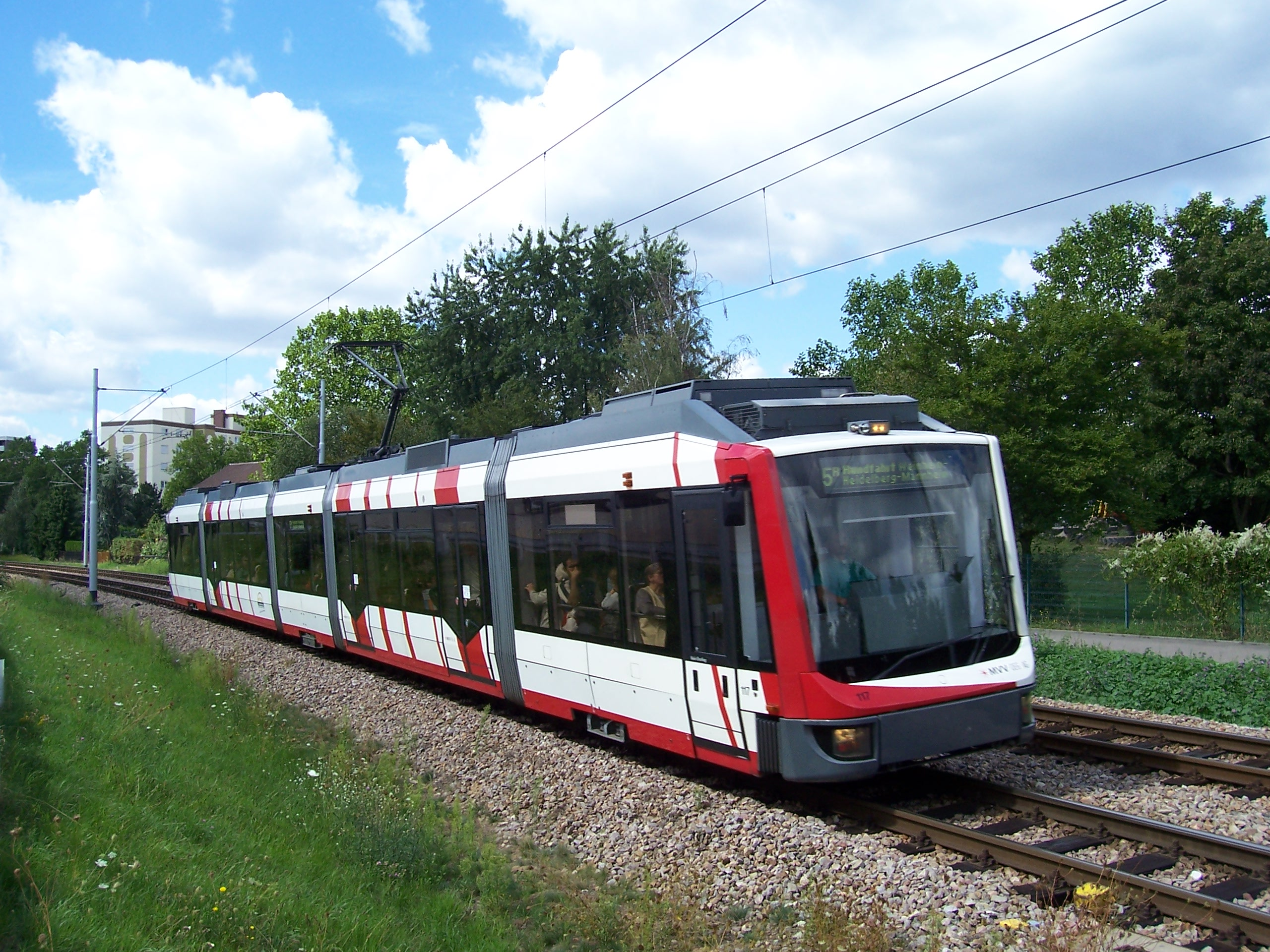
Car 117, a Variobahn set of the first series

After calls for accessibility in public transport became stronger in the 1990s, another replica of the Duewag Gt8 would have been unacceptable. The OEG decided to procure five-part Variobahn sets from the manufacturer ABB Henschel. A prototype in 100% low-floor construction was delivered in 1993 to the Chemnitz Tramway. In contrast to this, the OEG decided to use powered bogies with conventional axles, so only about 70% of the car floor is low-floor, the vehicle width was left at 2.50 metres, the maximum possible on the OEG network, with the outer shape adopted from the Chemnitz prototype. Six five-piece vehicles were delivered by ABB's successor Adtranz from 1996 with the operating numbers of 117 to 122. Initially, they were used only in student traffic between Mannheim-Kurpfalzbrücke and Edingen, but from January 1997 they were used on the complete OEG circuit. The six OEG Variobahn now represent the smallest class of vehicle in the RNV.

=== Rhein-Neckar-Variobahn RNV6 ===
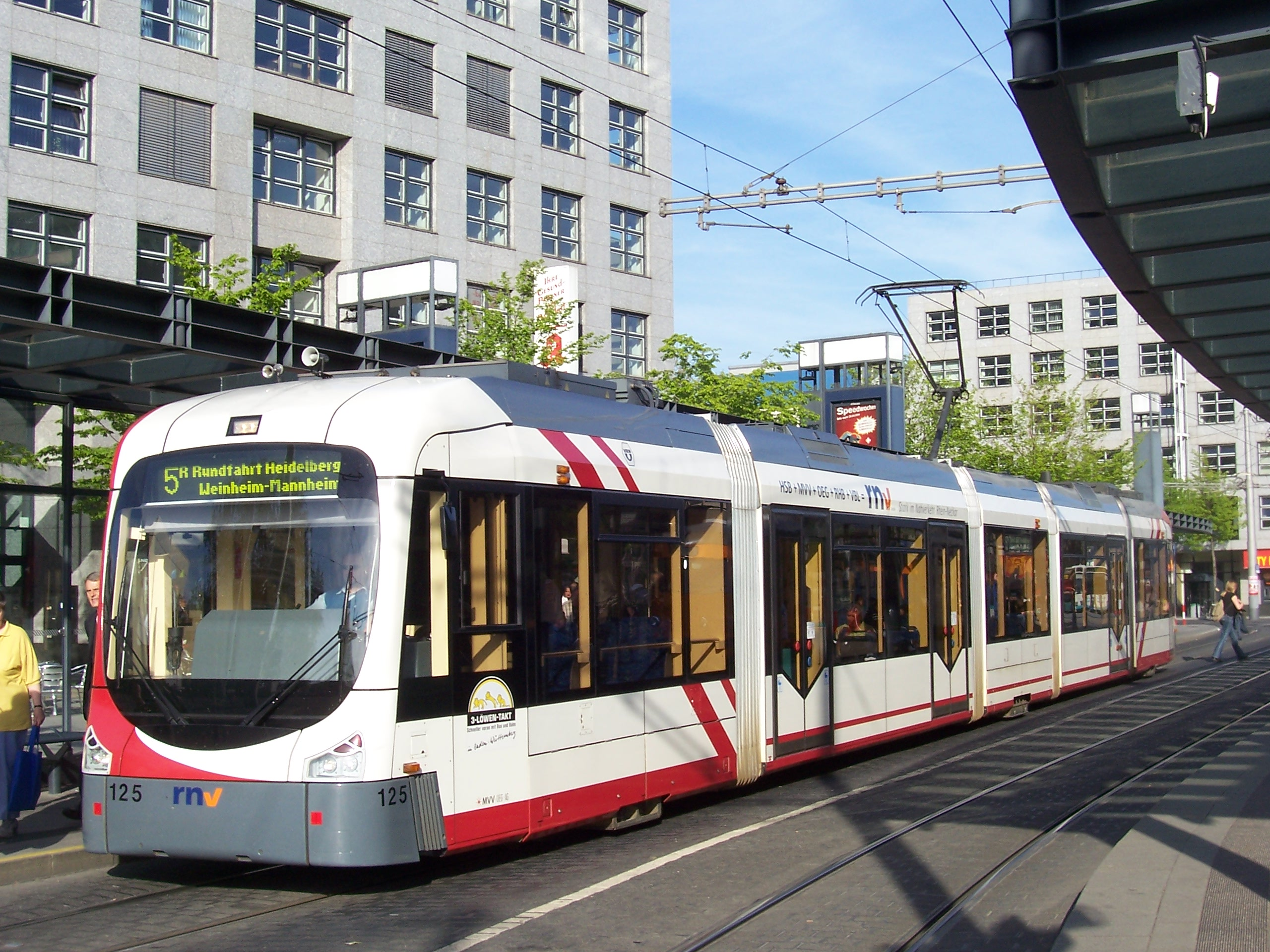
Railcar no. 125 of class RNV6

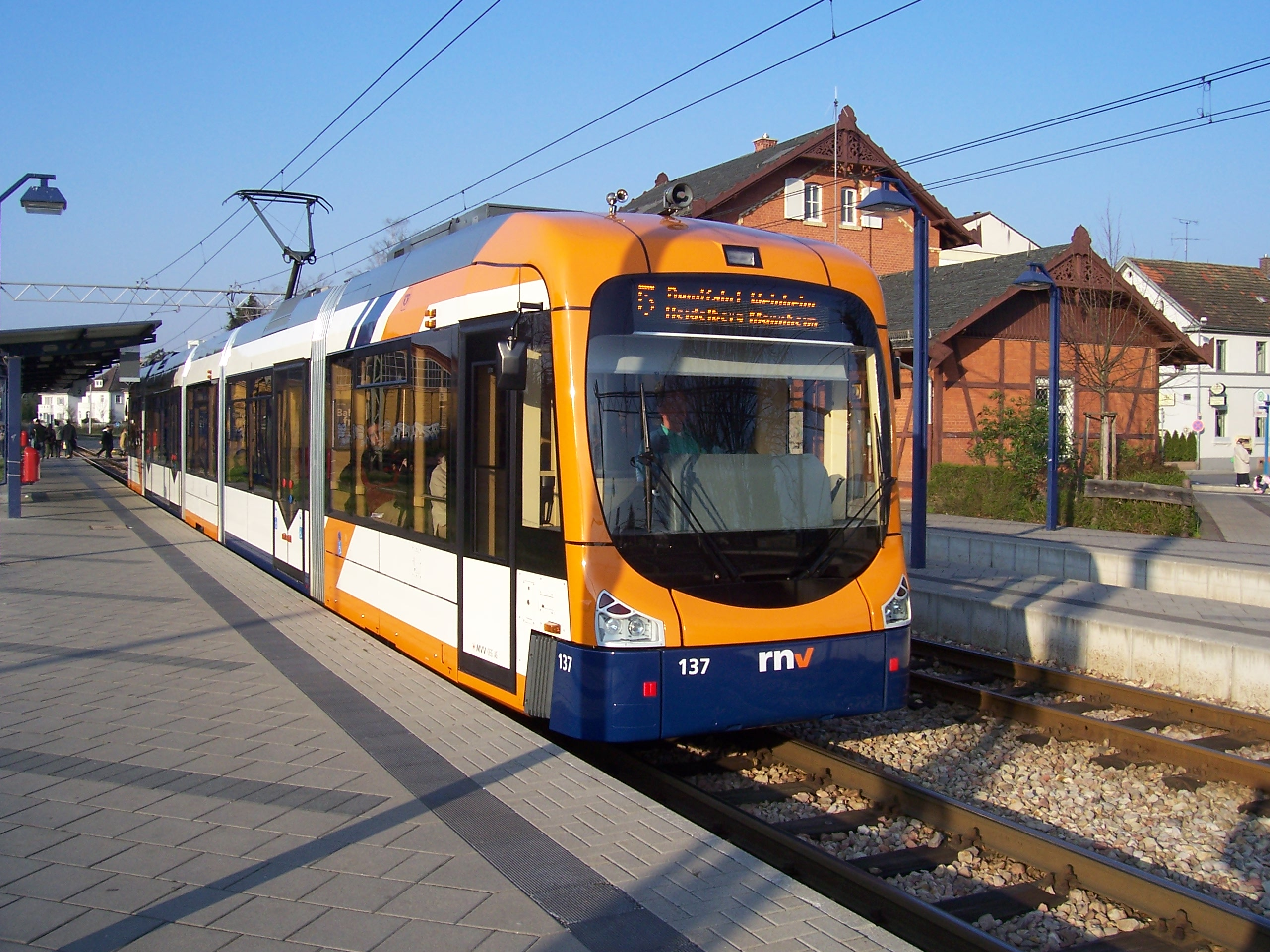
Railcar no. 137

As the first joint vehicle procurement of the four transport companies in the Rhine-Neckar triangle—OEG, VBL, MVV and HSB—the successor class, the Rhine-Neckar Variobahn was developed in four variants (one-directional or two-directional vehicle, five-part or seven-part). In 2003, the OEG procured ten bidirectional five-part vehicles from the manufacturer Bombardier, which were numbered 123 to 132. Due to its smaller width of 2.40 metres compared to its predecessors and the possibility of negotiating curves with a radius of 15 metres, these cars can be used freely on all sections of the metre-gauge network in the Rhine-Neckar Triangle. The ten RNV6 cars of the initial order were the last cars that were still delivered in the red/white OEG livery.

Another ten Variobahn cars (133 to 142) followed from July 2006, which are essentially technically identical to the cars of the first delivery. The RNV was commissioned to carry out the operation of transport services of the former transport companies from 2005. Therefore, these cars were painted in the orange-blue RNV design in the factory. Three identical vehicles (761 to 763) were procured from MVV Verkehr; they are also used on the OEG routes as part of the common vehicle pool.

The second batch was followed by a further eight cars from January 2010, which differ from their predecessors in being equipped with Mitrac Energy Saver supercapacitors. They were not procured for the first time by the “old companies”, but directly by the RNV and have carried the four-digit numbers of 4143 to 4150 since their delivery. Car 4149 suffered flood damage in the factory and was therefore not delivered to the RNV for a long time. After the inductive power transmission system was trialed by the manufacturer Bombardier in Augsburg, the car was used by the RNV as a test and training vehicle and equipped accordingly. The car, which is not used in regular service, is numbered 4349.

In April 2011, the RNV announced a new order for eleven more vehicles of this class. A twelfth car was also built as a replacement for the undelivered car 4149. The first car of the fourth series was delivered as no. 4151 on 4 January 2013, and the last of the twelve cars was delivered as no. 4162 in July 2013. Thus the procurement of vehicle types by the old companies ended, with future vehicle to be carried out by the RNV.

=== Operating numbers of the OEG vehicles within the RNV ===
With the founding of the RNV, it was faced with the problem that there were up to three vehicles designated with the same company number. So as not to have to fundamentally change all documents and vehicle files, the former operating numbers were simply preceded by a fourth digit. This number usually represents the old company. Initially, the new numbering system was used internally for the automatic vehicle location system and then it was installed on the outside of almost all vehicles during 2009 and 2010.

The rail vehicles of the OEG were given the initial designation of 4. So former car 98 is now called 4098 and car 123 is now 4123.

The buses of the OEG were given the initial designation of 9. However, due to the suspension of OEG bus operations in December 2009, the extended numbers were never attached to the outsides of the buses.

== Ticket machines ==
The first series of 15 ticket vending machines was purchased at the end of the 1960s. The first trains were operated on a one-man basis without a guard in 1969. As part of the transition, the OEG ordered another 54 machines, which were installed in 1973 and 1974. The OEG was one of the first non-federal railways in Germany that had vending machines at its stations as a prerequisite for one-man operations. In 1975, most of the stations were equipped with ticket machines, meaning that one-man operations of all trains was supported. Tickets have been issued only at vending machines or in advance since 1 July 2005. This allows the reduction of station stop times and thus increases the punctuality of trains. In the beginning, however, machines were not available at all stations.

== Electrification ==
Electrification increased the maximum line speed from 25 km/h to 40 km/h. The new train sets were supplied with compressed air brakes, but the existing traction units and vehicle fleet were also converted from Körting vacuum brakes to Knorr air brakes between 1928 and 1931, largely overnight and during public holidays. At the same time the existing Willer couplers in railcars and funnel couplers with dome irons (Trichterkupplung mit Kuppeleisen) in locomotives and railcars were also converted to Scharfenberg couplers.

As a power system, the OEG used direct current, initially at 1200 volts. However, the equipment of the vehicles was also designed for the voltage of 600 volts used by the trams in Mannheim and Heidelberg, and for historical reasons the polarity was reversed on the Heidelberg tram network. From 1974, the power supply of the OEG routes gradually changed to 750 volts. This eliminates the voltage switching at the transition to the tram networks of Mannheim and Heidelberg. Between 1980 and 1990, with the conversion of the routes in the city networks of Mannheim and Heidelberg from 600 to 750 volts, the running voltage was standardised for the first time. The reversal of polarity at the entrance and exit to the Heidelberg network was carried out automatically over approximately 70 metre-long, neutral sections, which were run over using momentum. The power supply of the Heidelberg tram network was completely reversed between 16 and 17 January 2015, so that the power supply on all lined of the RNV is now uniform (direct current 750 volts, negative on the contact wire). The neutral sections under the Czerny bridge and in Handschuhsheim Nord were eliminated as a result.
