= Upper Rhine Railway =

Upper Rhine Railway may refer to:

- Upper Rhine Railway Company (Oberrheinische Eisenbahn-Gesellschaft or OEG), a railway infrastructure company and transport company based in Mannheim, Germany.
- Mannheim–Karlsruhe–Basel railway, a railway line that runs roughly parallel to the Upper Rhine from Mannheim in Germany to Basel in Switzerland

== See also ==
- High Rhine Railway (Hochrheinbahn), a railway line that runs roughly parallel to the High Rhine from Basel in Switzerland to Singen in Germany
