= Mannheim-Käfertal–Heddesheim railway =

German railway line

Mannheim-Käfertal–Heddesheim

Overview
- Line number: 669 (until 1970: 300g; until 1992: 568)
- Locale: Baden-Württemberg, Germany

Service
- Route number: 9403

Technical
- Line length: 6.5 km (4.0 mi)
- Number of tracks: 1 except: Rott–Vogelstang West (2); Wallstadt West–Wallstadt Ost (2)
- Track gauge: 1,000 mm (3 ft 3 3/8 in) metre gauge
- Minimum radius: 23 m (75 ft)
- Electrification: 750 V DC overhead catenary
- Operating speed: 80 km/h (50 mph)

The Mannheim-Käfertal–Heddesheim railway is a metre-gauge railway between Mannheim-Käfertal and Heddesheim, in the German state of Baden-Württemberg. It was built by the former Oberrheinischen Eisenbahn-Gesellschaft AG (Upper Rhine Railway Company, OEG), later MVV OEG AG and is now operated by MVV Verkehr GmbH (infrastructure owner) and RNV (operations manager and train operator) according to Eisenbahn-Bau- und Betriebsordnung für Schmalspurbahnen (narrow-gauge railway regulations; ESBO). However, the 6.5 km-long line is still owned by MVV Verkehr AG (the City of Mannheim's transport utility) as the successor to the OEG. It is operated as a branch line using electronic direct traffic control.

== History ==
The line was opened on 1 May 1909 by the South German Railway Company (Süddeutsche Eisenbahn-Gesellschaft AG, SEG) as a branch of the Mannheim–Weinheim line, which was opened in 1887. However, it was sometimes unpopular among the people of Wallstadt, as the nearby terminus of the Feudenheim–Mannheim tram line had a cheaper fare, a more frequent service and a better connection to downtown Mannheim, so many people preferred to walk from Wallstadt to Feudenheim.

The Käfertal–Heddesheim branch line has been operated electrically since 1 November 1946. The electrification was carried out with material from the disused Feudenheim–Mannheim line.

The local signal boxes were replaced by automatic block signaling in 1979. The line was then controlled by the signal box in Käfertal, which was put into operation in 1978.

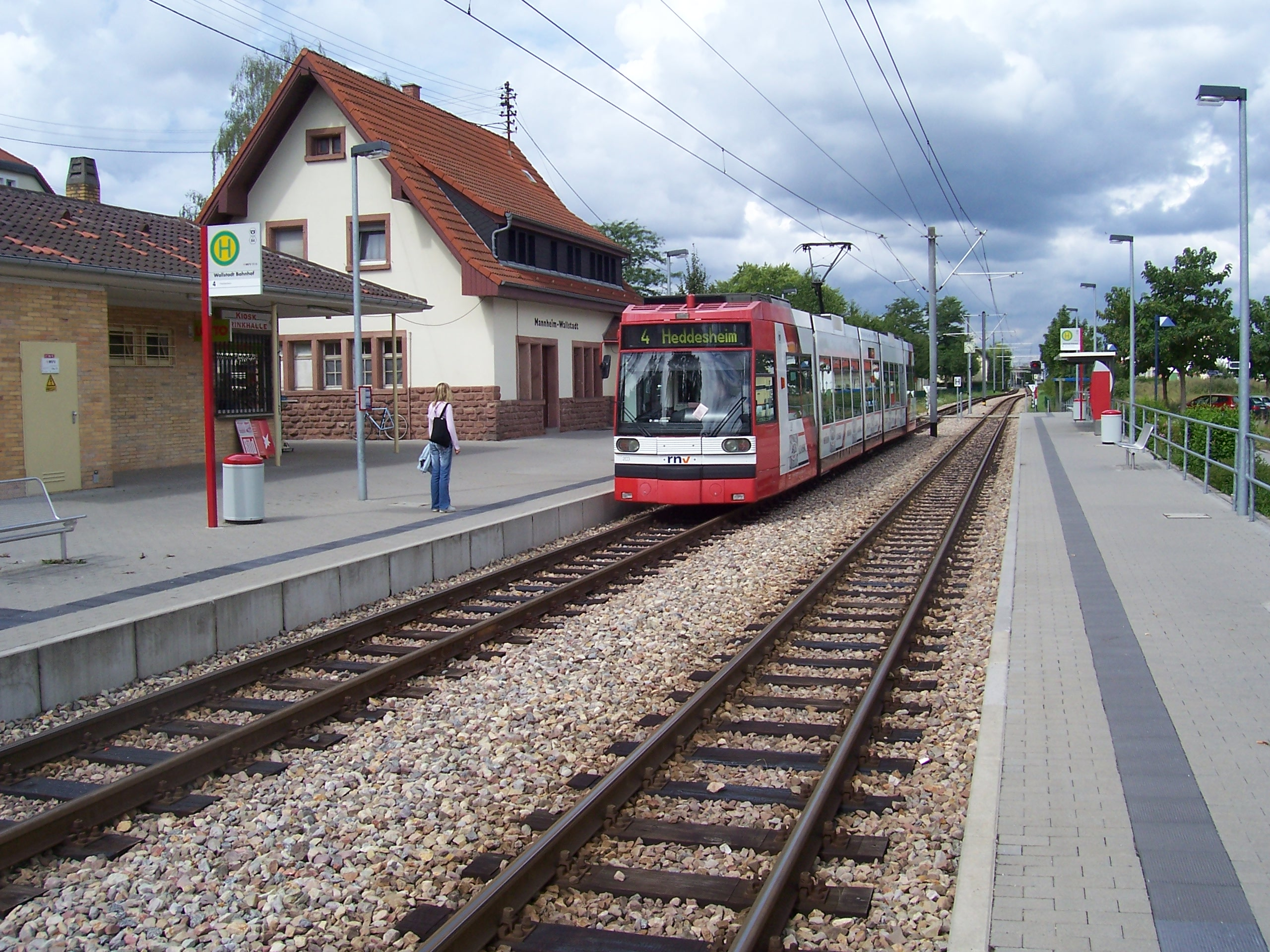
Verkehrsbetriebe Ludwigshafen set running as line 4 in Wallstadt station

The MVG 2000 concept, which led to big changes for the OEG, was implemented in 1995. The line to Heddesheim became part of a tram line of the former MVG and Verkehrsbetriebe Ludwigshafen GmbH (VBL). After that, tram line 4 replaced the OEG service and ran continuously from Heddesheim to Ludwigshafen-Oggersheim and Bad Dürkheim.

The second track at Im Rott station was opened on 9 September 2001.

Due to the increased demand from new residential areas in Wallstadt, there was support for a reduction of services intervals from 20 minutes to ten minutes. This was not possible because of the single-track line to Heddesheim. In 2012, a balloon loop was built to the east of the overpass built over the A6 in 2008. The loop was put into operation on schedule in December 2012.

The whole signal infrastructure and signalling operations were renewed between 2010 and 2014. Since the spring of 2014, the entire line has been equipped with the "Ks" signalling system (Ks-Signalsystem), a new colour light signals system being introduced in Germany.

== Operations ==
Originally passenger traffic on the line was operated as one of four independently operated OEG lines, but it had no line designation. The carriage shed was in Heddesheim.

Operations were discontinued due to the Second World War from 26 March to 18 June 1945.

After the completion of the electrification of the OEG line, the service on the line was extended to Mannheim Hauptbahnhof and designated as line C.

Trains ran every 24 minutes from 2 June 1957, but they did not continue to Mannheim in the mornings until 29 September 1963.

A reduced timetable with less regular intervals was operated from 1 July 1971 to 31 June 1973; in the evenings trains were replaced by buses. From 28 May 1978 trains only ran as far as Käfertal on Sundays; later this also applied to services at lunchtime on non-school days.

The Duewag-GT6 sets were replaced with B4 trailer cars from July 1982 until 21 May 1993.

Another half-hour cycle was introduced on 23 May 1993 and additional trains ran between Schriesheim and Heidelberg. The top speed was increased from 60 km/h to 80 km/h.

Since 24 September 1995, the line from Käfertal to Heddesheim has been served by the MVV (later MVV-V) tram line 4 from Ludwigshafen-Oggersheim, which was extended from Käfertal.

In December 2008, the Bad Dürkheim–Ludwigshafen-Oggersheim railway, which previously ran to Mannheim-Innenstadt (inner city), was integrated into tram line 4. The connection to Bad Dürkheim was trialled earlier in evening traffic. GT6N trams were normally used, although RNV8ER trams operated occasionally.

With the opening of the tram line to Gartenstadt in June 2016, it became the new destination for trams on line 4 from Bad Dürkheim, so the trains from Heddesheim to Käfertal now run as line 5A, instead of line 5 as previously, and continue to Edingen. In the peak hour, when formerly no line 5 services ended in Käfertal, the line 5A services now run to the city centre and return to Wallstadt as line 15. Originally it was planned to separate a portion in Käfertal that would run on the OEG's circuit line.
