= Railgrinder =

Railway maintenance vehicle

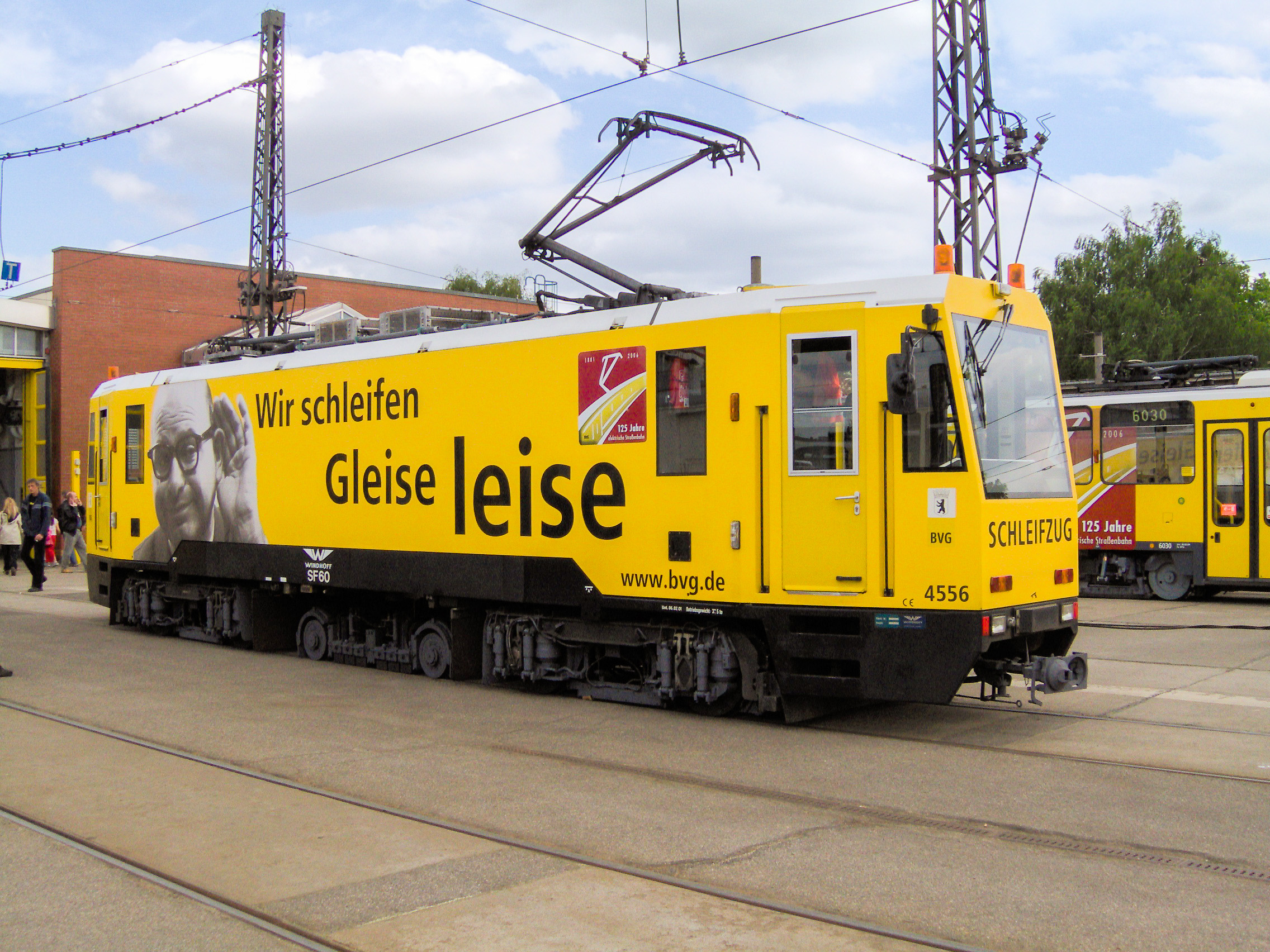
This Windhoff railgrinder is used on the Straßenbahn Berlin. The inscription means "We grind tracks quiet".

Video: Tram rail grinding with a small grinding machine

A railgrinder (or rail grinder) is a maintenance of way vehicle or train used to restore the profile and remove irregularities from worn tracks to extend its life and to improve the ride of trains using the track. Rail grinders were developed to increase the lifespan of the tracks being serviced for rail corrugation. Rail grinding is a process that is done to stop the deformation due to use and friction on railroad tracks by removing deformations and corrosion. Railway tracks that experience continual use are more likely to experience corrugation and overall wear. Rail grinders are used to grind the tracks when rail corrugation is present, or before corrugation begins to form on the tracks. Major freight train tracks use rail grinders for track maintenance based on the interval of tonnage, rather than time. Transit systems and subways in major cities continue to use scheduled rail grinding processes to combat the corrugation common to heavily used tracks. Rail-grinding equipment may be mounted on a single self-propelled vehicle or on a dedicated rail-grinding train which, when used on an extensive network, may include crew quarters. The grinding wheels, of which there may be more than 100, are set at controlled angles to restore the track to its correct profile.

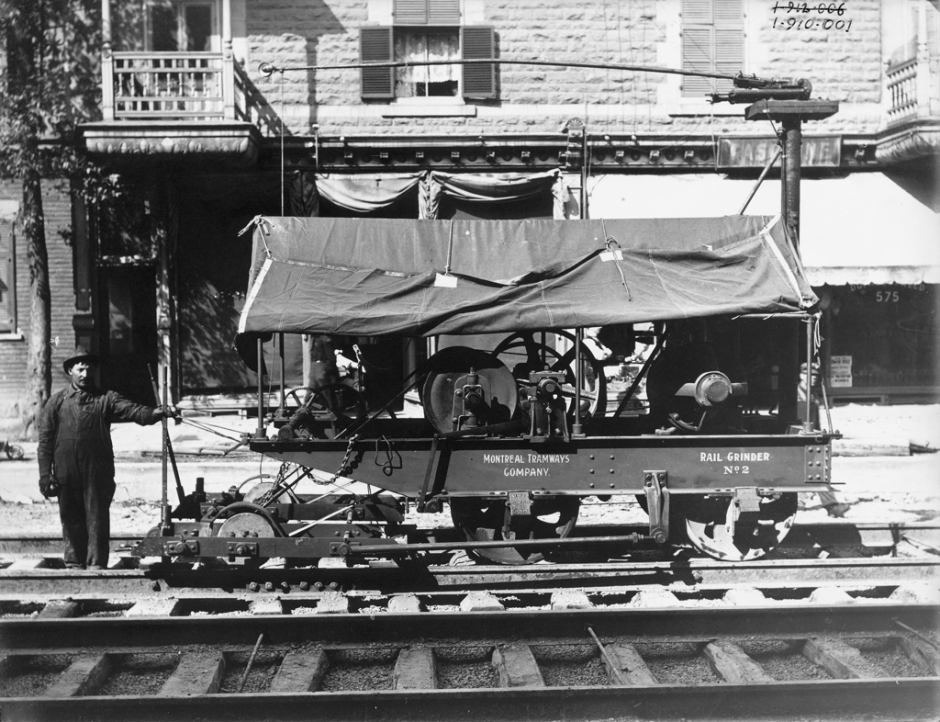
A railgrinder and its operator in Montreal, 1912

The machines have been in use in North America and Europe since the early 20th century. They are made by specialist rail maintenance companies who may also operate them under contract.

The early 2000s saw several advancements in rail maintenance technology, most notably the introduction of track reprofiling by rail milling trains for which advantages in accuracy of the profile and quality of the processed surface are claimed. A second technology that is gaining widespread acceptance in Europe, Germany in particular, is high-speed grinding. While it cannot reprofile rails like milling or other grinding trains, its working speed of approximately 80 km/h allows defect removal and prevention to be achieved with little or no impact on other scheduled traffic.

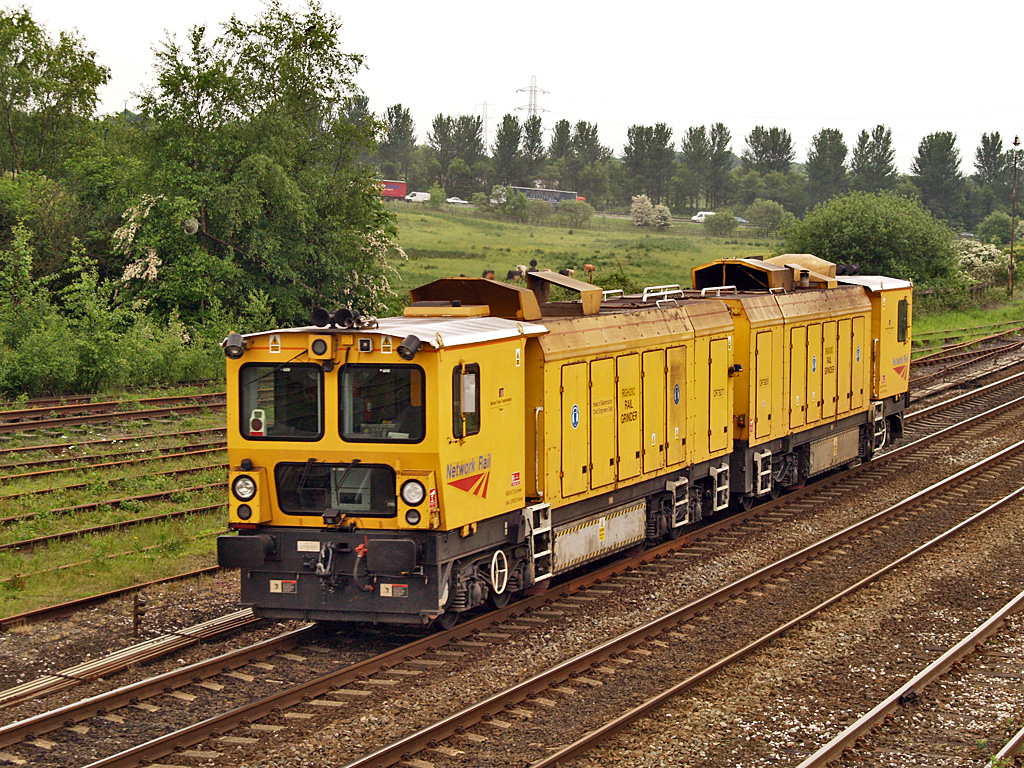
Switch and crossing railgrinder

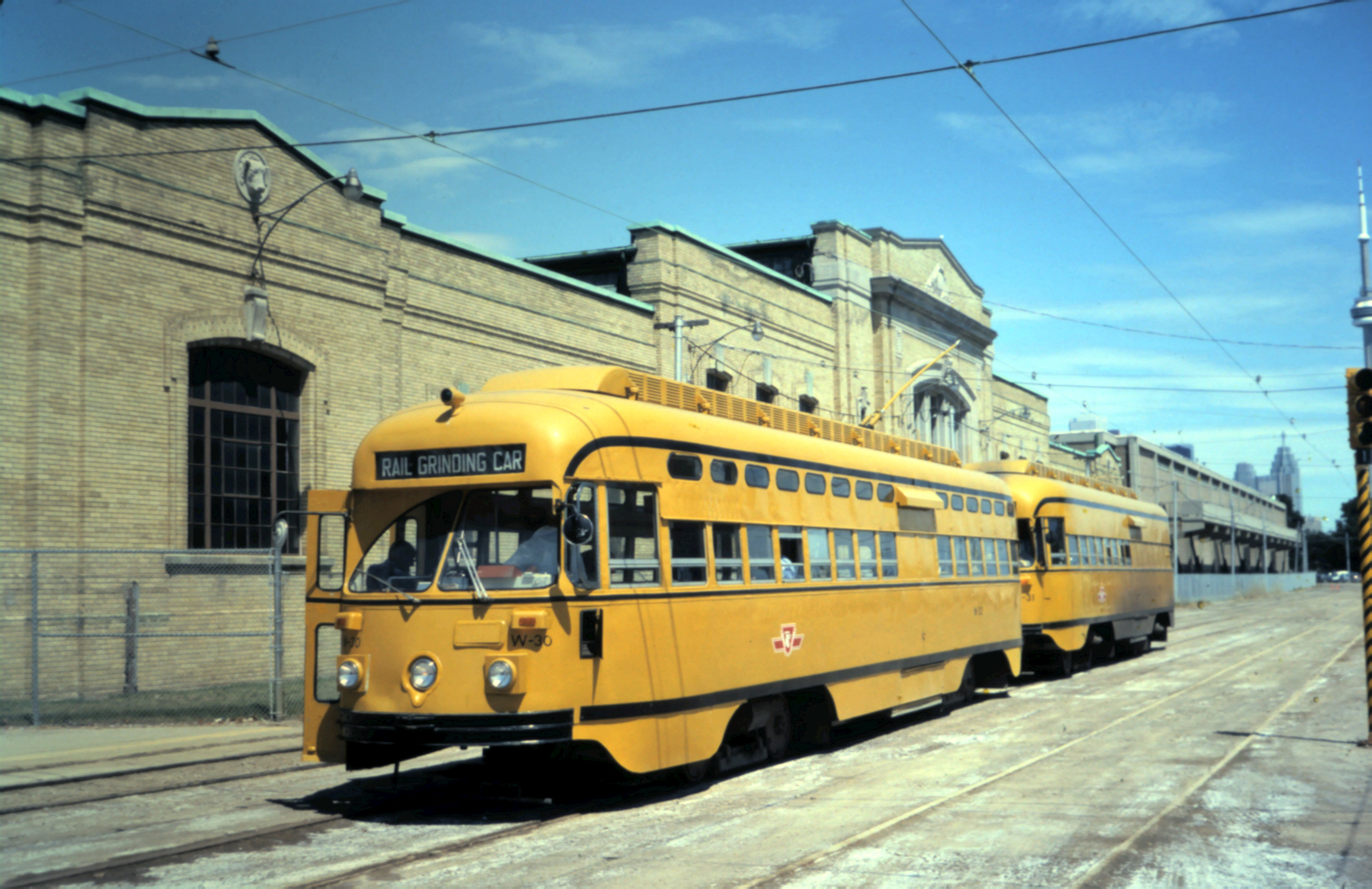
Railgrinders are sometimes made from former passenger vehicles, like this one in Toronto.

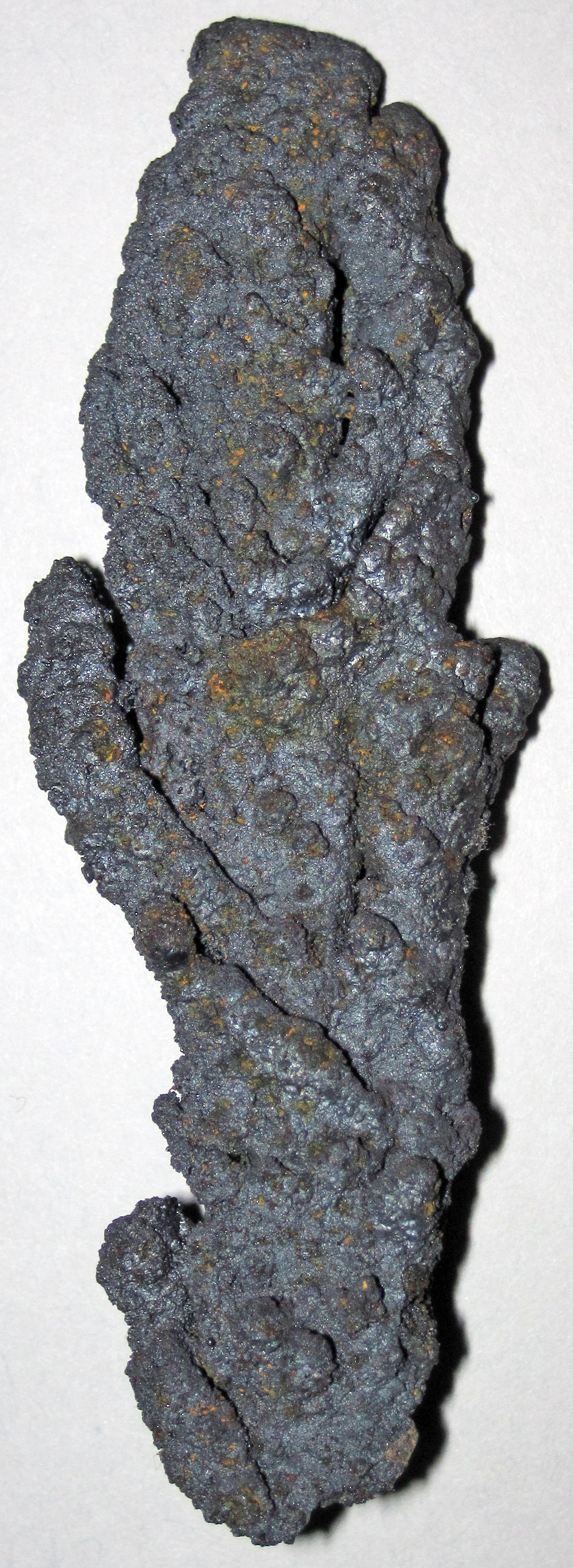
Welded mass of steel shavings left behind after a grinder passes by.

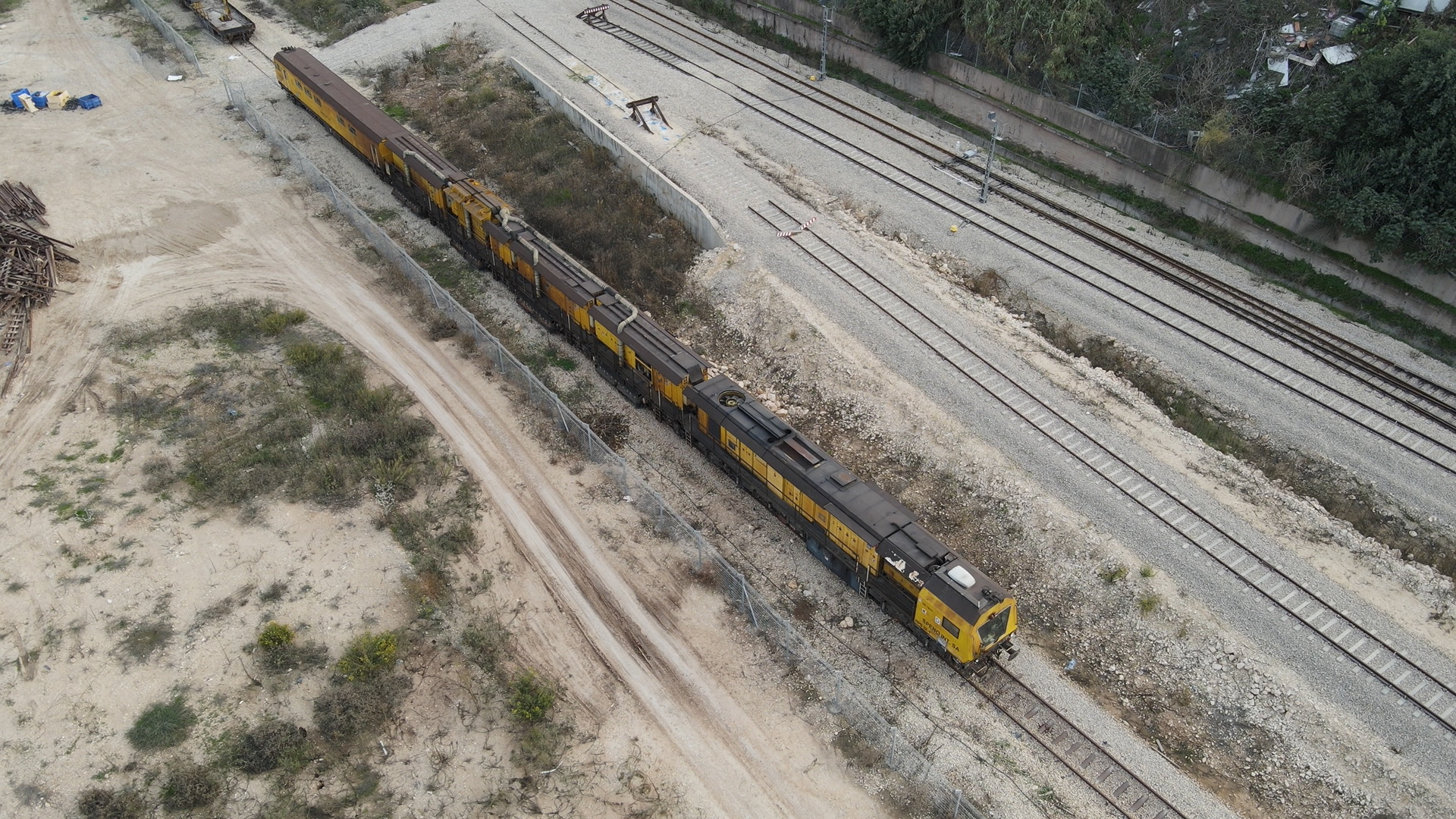
Rail Grinder number 876 (SPENO RPS 32–1) in Beit Shemesh, Israel

== Hand-held rail grinders ==
The ERICO Company manufactures hand-held rail grinders and drills for the railway industry as maintenance of way tools. ERICO uses Honda four-stroke engines to power their railway drill and rail grinder. Rail grinders are used for rail preparation prior to the attachment of bonds, and serve as a multipurpose tool capable of rail preparation, maintenance and repair.

== Grinding quality index ==
The grinding quality index (GQI) is a software-based template used to measure the profile of a rail. This allows the desired rail profile to be compared to the actual rail profile. GQI software makes use of laser-based hardware mounted to the front and rear of the rail grinder. The use of laser-based hardware on maintenance of way vehicles such as rail grinders allows workers and contractors to take precise measurements of the rail profile before and after grinding. The GQI is rated from 0 (low priority) to 100 (high priority). Grinding Quality Software is able to record and document measurements independently and provide a GQI rating for each rail on the track for before and after each pass on the grinder. The advantage of using GQI software is the ability to produce post-grinding reports for later usage by planners to help further prioritize and monitor grinding profiles in the future. GQI reports also provide analysis on the consistency of profiling to determine if grinding operations are consistently improving or deteriorating the rail profile. The usage of GQI software also provides the ability to produce accurate assessments of rail grinder effectiveness in real-time which allows for work to be prioritized more efficiently and be executed in a timely manner.

== Health concerns ==
In the railway industry, there are risks with the prolonged use of maintenance of way vehicles during track maintenance and construction. A common risk is prolonged exposure to excessive whole body vibration and shock exposure to the vertical and horizontal axes of the lumbar spine and vertebral endplate, which can lead to spinal injury and or long-term damage to the vertebral bone structure. The American Conference of Governmental Industrial Hygienists has proposed thresholds for whole-body vibration with certain guidelines also being based on ISO-2631 standards, but no exposure thresholds for maintenance of way vehicles have been widely published or enforced. The ACGIH-TLV limits whole-body vibration to no more than 8 hours. In the European Union a risk assessment model (VibRisk model) for structural failure of the lumbar spine in the lower back was proposed as a result of vibration risk research. The VibRisk model provides more specific risk assessments of vertebral endplate failure on individual lumbar levels taking into account driver posture. When compared, risk assessments using the VibRisk Model rate a higher risk of vertebral endplate failure at different lumbar levels than ISO-2631 Part 5 standards suggest. The main contributing factor that VibRisk incorporates that the ISO-2631 Part 5 standards are lacking is the recognition of operator posture as an additional stress factor when exposed to vibration and multiple shocks.

== Rail corrugation ==
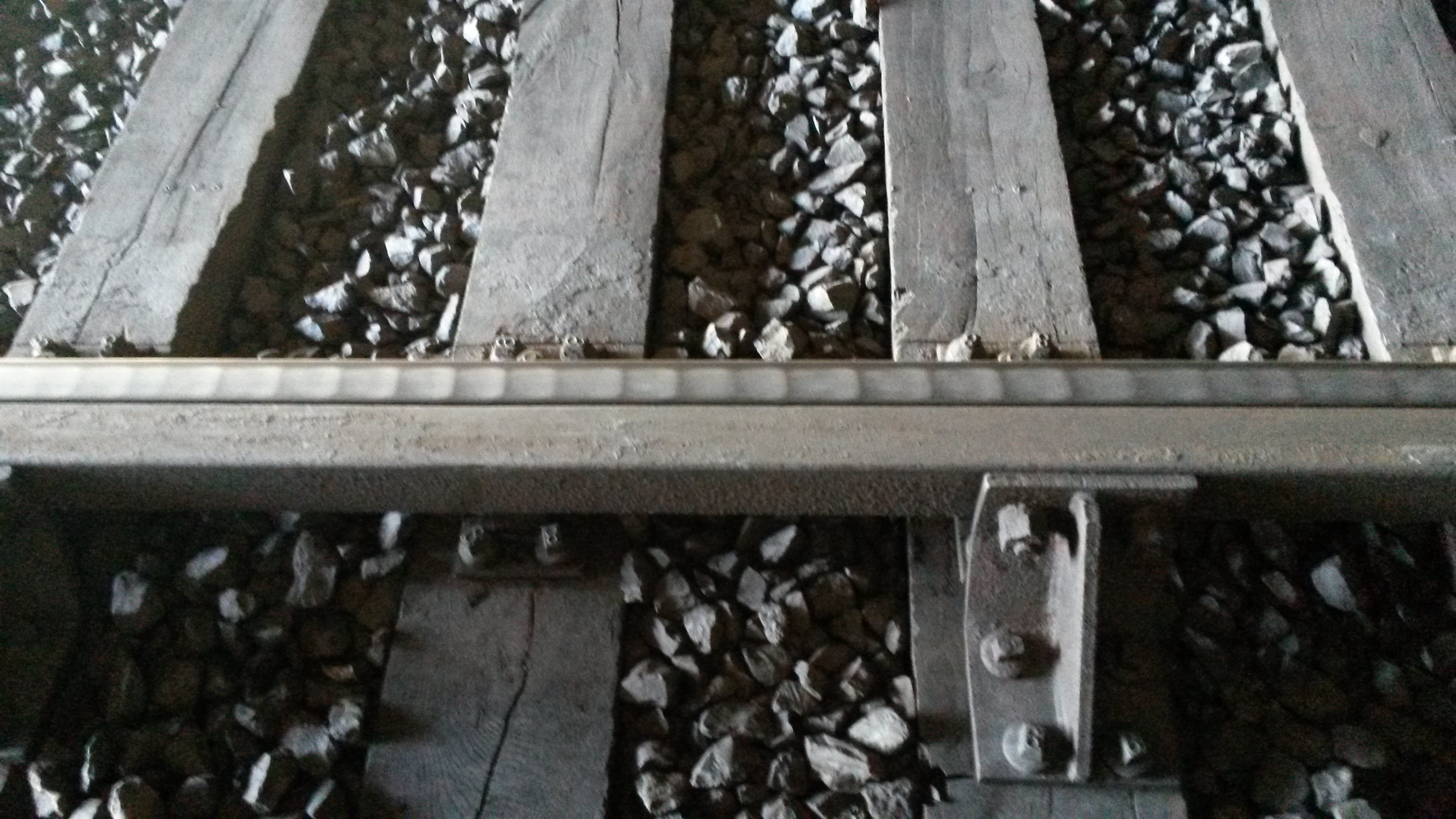
Rail corrugation

Rail corrugation or roaring rails is a type of track wear that develops from track and train wheel set contact over time. Once this process has started, it will begin to grow exponentially worse as time progresses. The wear that develops due to the wheel set contact between railways takes its form in the many troughs and crests it leaves behind over time, which may or may not develop into rail corrugation, depending on the circumstances. Rails that are heavily used and put under continual and constant wear will develop rail corrugation. Rail corrugation is represented in wavelength. Typically, heavily corrugated rails experience a concave deformation on the top of the railroad track in 20 mm to 200 mm intervals. Significant rail corrugation can decrease the service life of tracks and make the replacement of the affected track necessary. Rail corrugation is caused by the friction between the rail and the train wheels tangentially, vertically, and axially. Wear corrugation is a result of friction on the lower rail, which comes in contact with the train wheel. Excessive corrugation can be identified by the wavelength found on the higher, or outer, rail. Rail corrugation may be limited or lessened with the use of heat treated or alloyed rails, as opposed to the traditional carbon composite rail. The estimated tendency for wear is calculated by taking into account fluctuations in track and wheel set contact which causes the amount of wear to vary. The dynamic properties of different lines of the track can lead to varied degrees of rail corrugation through the use of high-speed wheel sets. In a study of high-speed railroad tracks, four types of tracks were studied for their tendency to develop corrugation (RHEDA 200, AFTRAV, STEDEF, and high performance ballasted track) and of the four considered the ballasted track was the one least prone to rail corrugation with the AFTRAV track being the second most reliable as well.

=== Causes ===
It is generally accepted that a few distinct causes lie behind different wavelengths of railroad corrugation. One study indicates that the specific short-wave railroad deformity is mainly caused by pinned-pinned resonance, in which the rail vibrates as a fixed beam, as if pinned between periodically placed sleepers. The dynamic train-track interaction that causes fixed frequency vibrations at high speeds, commonly observed in light load metro operations, and the anti-resonance caused by the pinning of the rails on sleepers, causes deformation and the "roaring" corrugation of the rails.

== Rail corrugation prevention ==
Rail corrugation may be prevented by selecting rails with material compositions that are more resistant to corrugation. Heat-treated alloy steel rails with relative hardness are the most resistant, as opposed to Bessemer steels, due to a greater relative hardness. Rails with a Brinell hardness of 320 to 360 are best for corrugation-resistant rails. Trains may vary speed on the tracks in an effort to prevent corrugation from affecting sections or rail on a transit systems. Varying a train's speed, direction, and tonnage are beneficial for combating the growth of rail corrugation, as corrugation is caused by continually uniform friction. On subways and major transit systems, it is not possible to vary the direction of trains, making the use of annual and biennial rail grinding processes more applicable.

== Preventive rail grinding ==
Preventive rail grinding is done before any signs of rail corrugation development. Rail corrugation will develop exponentially if the first signs of rail corrugation are not ground or serviced. Preventive grinding removes the deformation from friction and the chemical breakdown of the tracks. Regular rail grinding is the primary maintenance operation used to combat roaring rail or short-pitched rail corrugation. Rail grinding operations occur periodically in order to prevent rail corrugation from occurring. Rail grinding cars can be taken down freight lines that traverse long distances in the same direction if the freight railway is used continually Rail corrugation, the carbon growth of the rail which is increased by friction, grows exponentially.

== Rail corrugation noise treatment ==
Rail corrugation is frequently the subject of community noise complaints. Often, vibrations of the corrugated track will become progressively worse, generating more friction and metal on metal contact. Roaring rail corrugation is a common reason for noise complaints in urban and suburban communities and is most prevalent when trains travel at moderate speed. It is often called short-pitch corrugation and is responsible for the majority of community reaction. The loud and uncomfortable vibration caused by rail corrugation on transit systems affects both transit system passengers and local communities where the railroads intersect. Short-pitch corrugation creates significantly more noise than normal railroad track friction, with a tone of about 500 to 800 hertz. Short-pitch corrugation is most commonly seen on railroads that do not experience regular rail grinding maintenance or that are rarely used. Rail support stiffness directly correlates with short-pitch corrugation.
