= Märkische Museum Railway =

Museum in Germany

Coordinates: 51°11′21″N 07°48′30″E

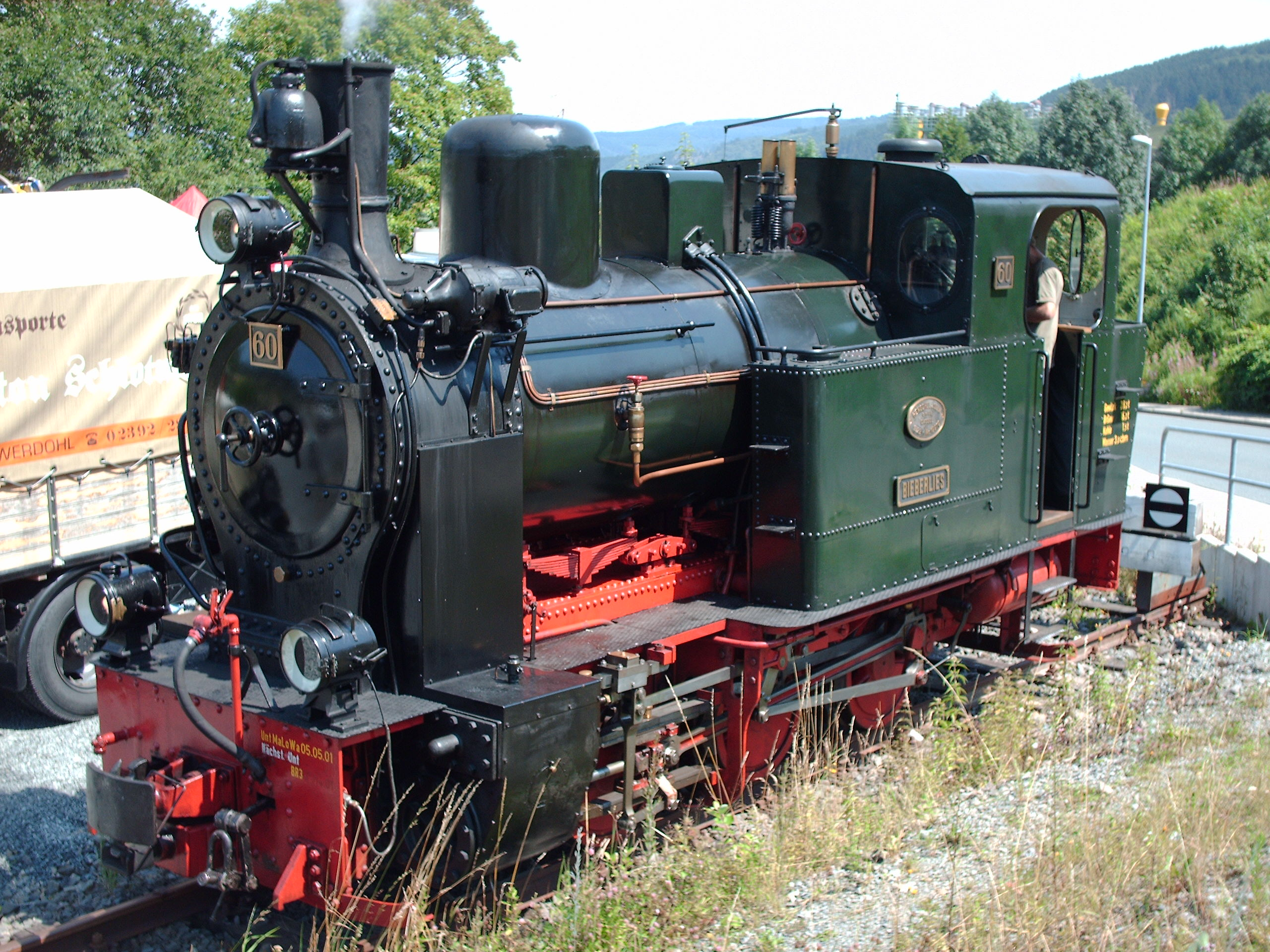
The MME's steam locomotive No. 60 Bieberlies

The Märkische Museum Railway (German: Märkische Museums-Eisenbahn) or MME is a German railway society that was founded in order to show narrow gauge vehicles in operation on small branch lines.

== History ==
Found on 14 July 1982 at Plettenberg, the society used the opportunity to buy vehicles, that had formerly worked in the Sauerland, from the Juist and Spiekerooge island railways which had just closed. The priority for their collection is the following railways:

- Kreis Altenaer Eisenbahn (KAE), 1888–1967
- Plettenberger Kleinbahn (PKB), 1896–1962
- Iserlohner Kreisbahn (IKB), 1900–1964
- Hohenlimburger Kleinbahn (HKB), 1900–1983
- Kleinbahn Haspe-Voerde-Breckerfeld (HVB), 1903–1963

In Plettenberg the society could take over the remaining trackage from the PKB and set up a temporary workshop in an old boiler house in order to restore the vehicles acquired. In the margins, relicts of the Ruhr-Lippe-Eisenbahn (RLE) and a host of narrow gauge industrial railway were able to be salvaged, including for example the historically interesting Harkort Coal Railway, which was founded by the industrial pioneer, Friedrich Harkort, and went into service in 1830 – no less than five years before the Nuremberg–Fürth railway – albeit initially as a wagonway.

== Museum railway ==
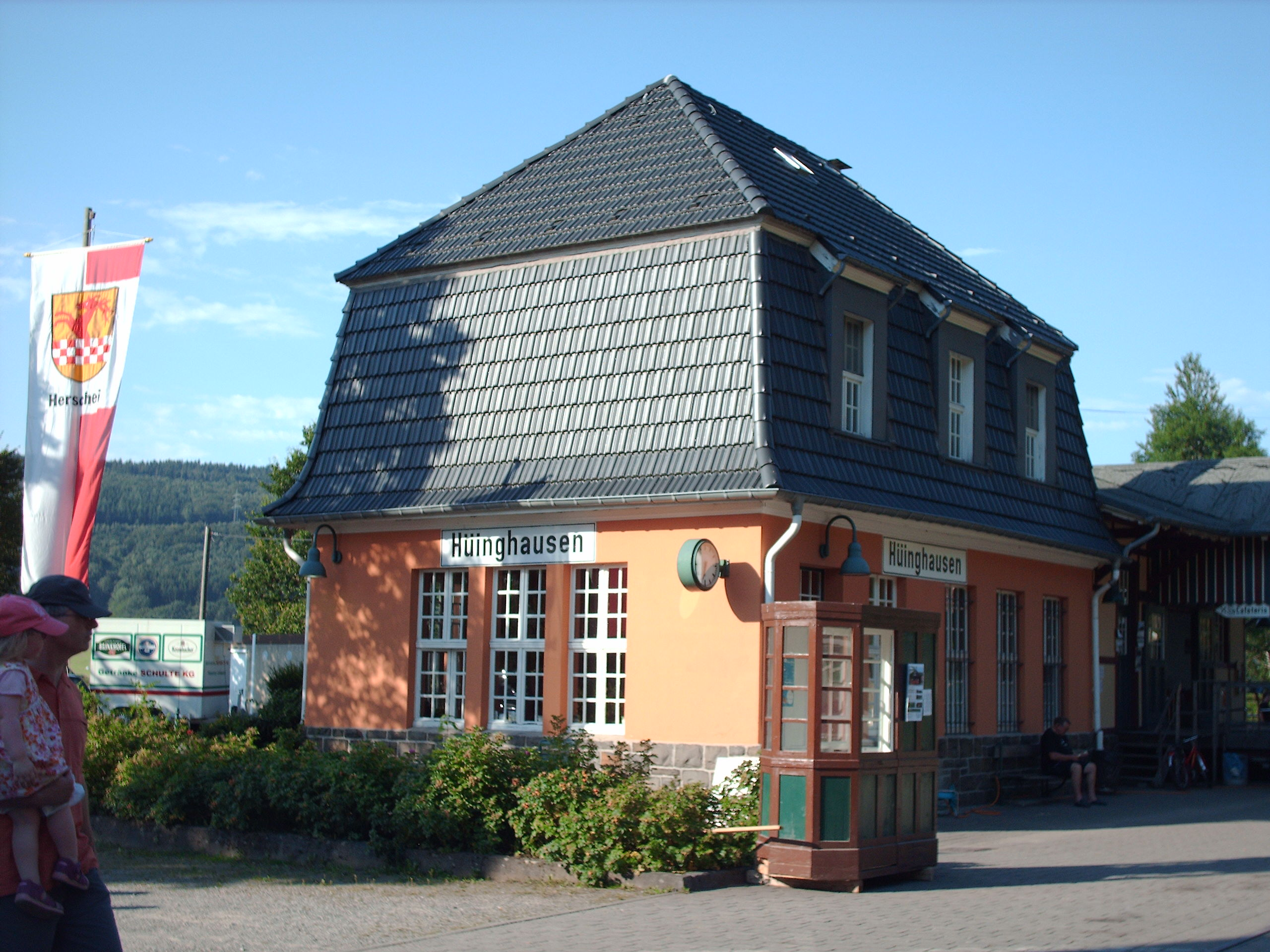
Hüinghausen station building

The society found a suitable site for the establishment of its 1,000 mm (3 ft 3 3/8 in) museum railway on the trackbed of the Plettenberg–Herscheid railway between Hüinghausen station and Köbbinghausen halt (formerly timetable route (Kursbuchstrecke or KBS) no. 239k, which had closed in 1969 and been subsequently dismantled. Operations are carried out under the name of the Sauerland Light Railway (Sauerländer Kleinbahn).
