= Hesnes Air =

Norwegian airline, 1992–2018

Hesnes Air AS
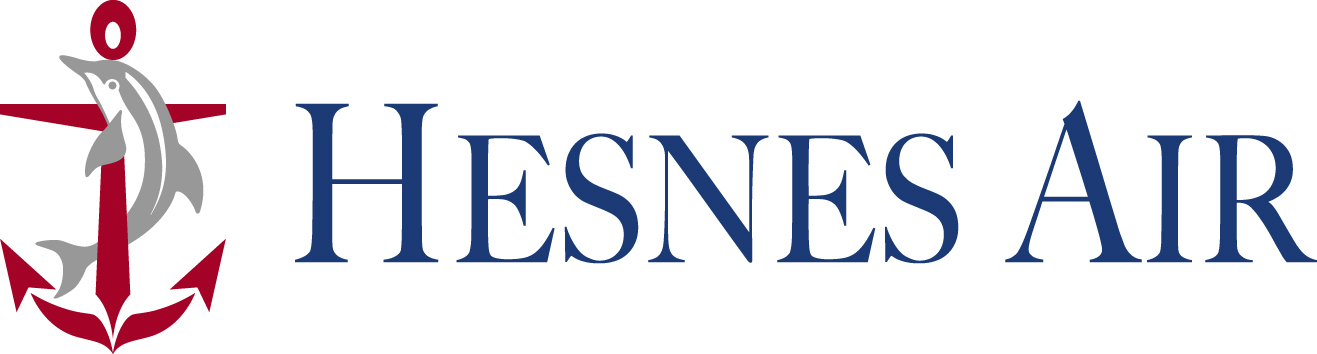
IATA	ICAO	Call sign
—	HSG	SKY DOLPHIN
- Founded: 1992
- Ceased operations: 2018
- Hubs: Sandefjord Airport, Torp
- Fleet size: 3+2 helicopters
- Destinations: World Wide
- Headquarters: Nøtterøy, Norway
- Key people: Pia K. Harneshaug (CEO)
- Website: www.hesnesair.no

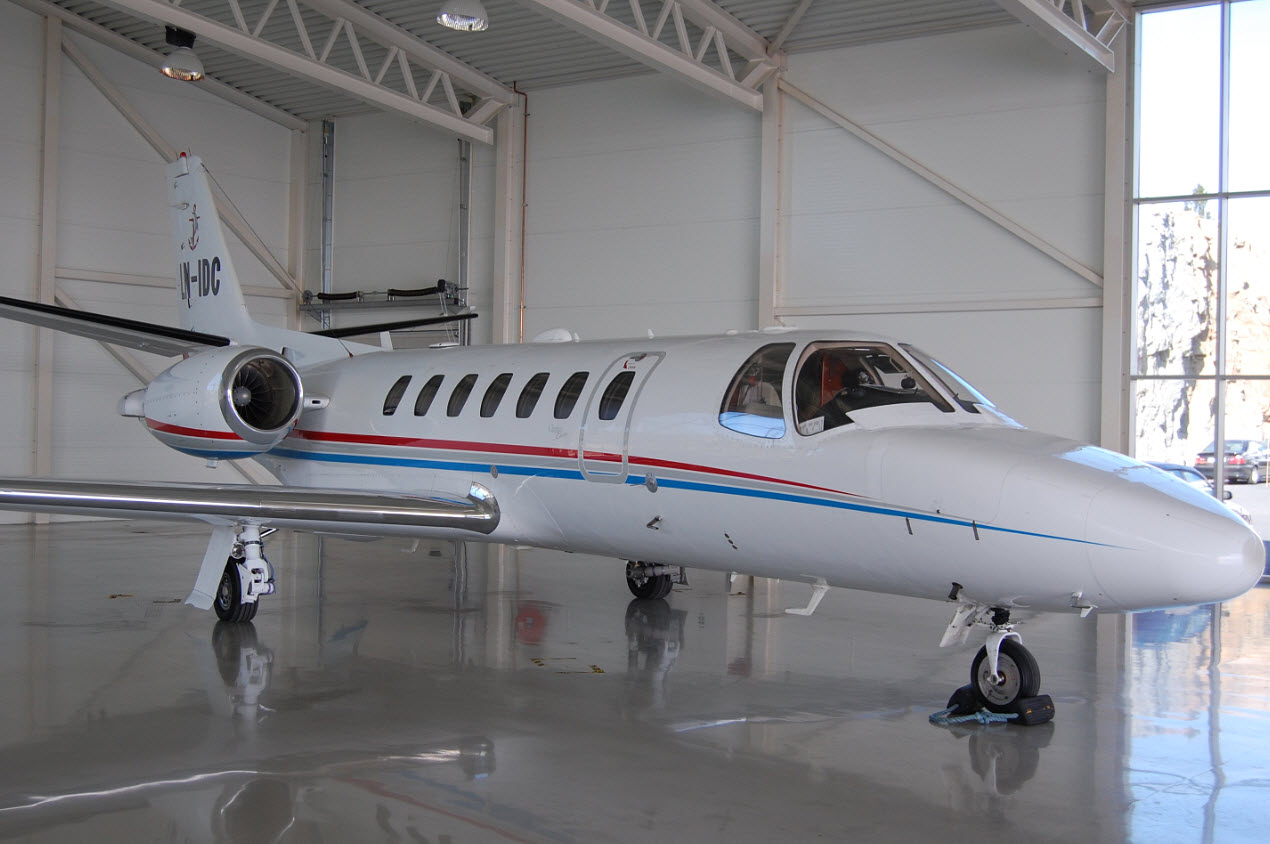
A Cessna Citation Encore from Hesnes Air in the hangar at Sandefjord Airport, Torp

Hesnes Air AS was a Norwegian private airline and helicopter company with registered office at Nøtterøy and office and hangar at Sandefjord Airport, Torp in Norway. The company was founded in 1992 and operates charter, cargo and ambulance flights, as well as helicopter operations throughout Europe. Hesnes Air specializes in complex and sophisticated aircraft- and helicopter services for both companies and private persons. The company is owned by Hesnes Holding AS, which operates within shipping and ship brokerage.

== History ==
Hesnes Air was established in 1992 and was granted operating permission from the CAA the same year. As a helicopter company with an Airbus Helicopter H125 (formerly Eurocopter AS 350 B3) Hesnes Air took on missions including long-line of flight, photo flights, cargo flights, predator monitoring, line monitoring, air taxi and passenger transport for private and business purposes across the country.

The company expanded its operations in 2006 acquiring its first aircraft, a Beechcraft B200C King Air. This aircraft was used for freight charters and ambulance missions, including donor flights all over Europe. The company expanded its operations again in 2007 with their second plane, a Cessna Citation Encore. In 2012 the company acquired an additional Cessna Citation Encore, and again in 2015 the fleet was expanded with a Cessna Citation Bravo and a second Airbus Helicopter H125 (formerly Eurocopter AS 350).

In April 2018 Pegasus Helicopter has signed an agreement with its Hesnes Air to take over Hesnes' helicopter operations.

In May 2018, the Swedish company Hummingbird Aviation acquired Hesnes Air. The company established a new base for the new Norwegian part of H-bird at Oslo Airport.

== Fleet ==
Hesnes Air operated the following:

Type	Seats	Call signal
Cessna Citation Encore (C560) (written off in January 2017)	8 seats	LN-IDB
Cessna Citation Encore (C560) (used for donor flights)	9 seats	LN-IDC
Citation Bravo (550)	8 seats	LN-IDD
Eurocopter (AS350 B3)	5 seats	LN-ODS
Eurocopter (AS350 B3)	5 seats	LN-OMW

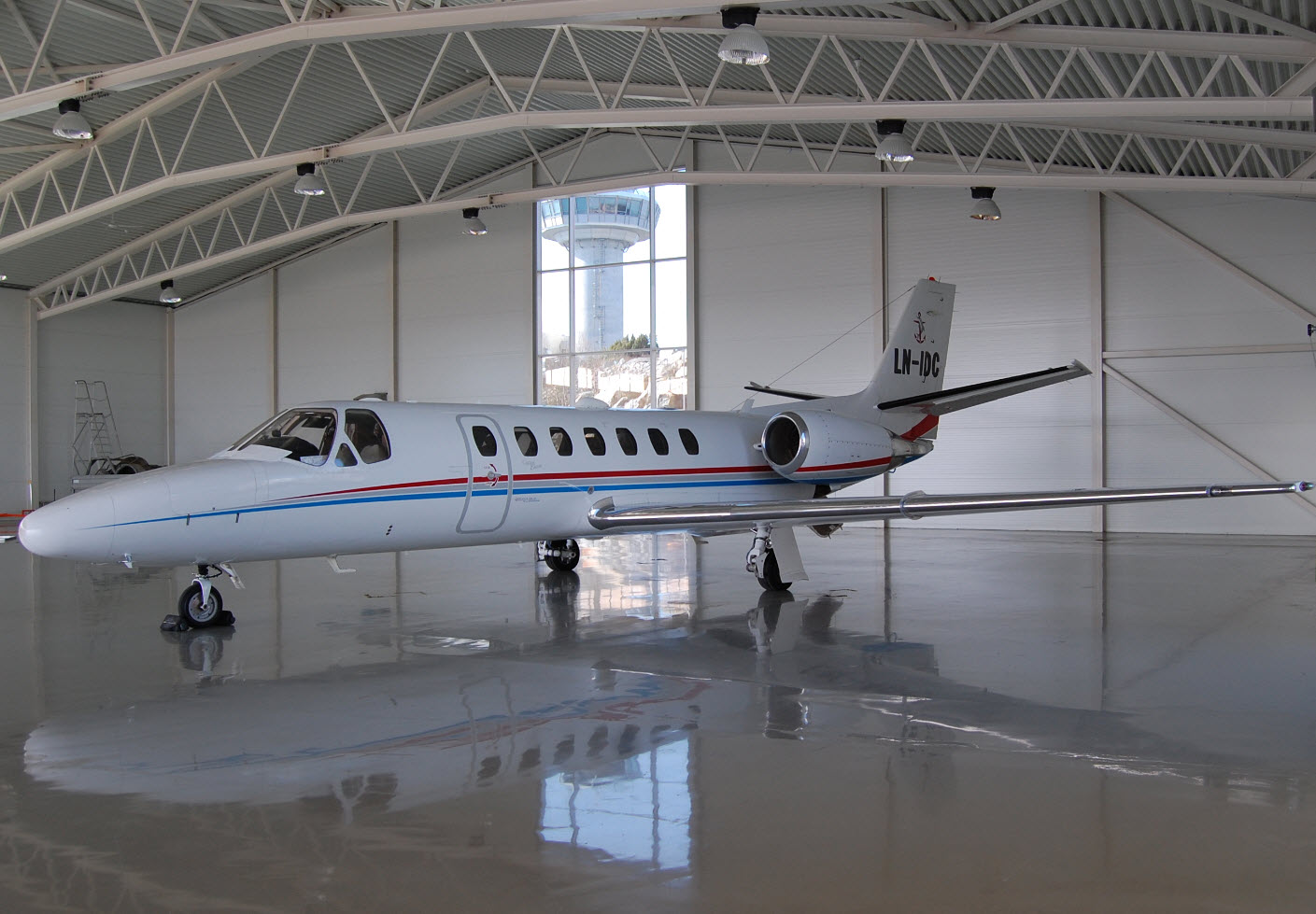
The Company's Cessna Citation Encore C560 LN-IDC

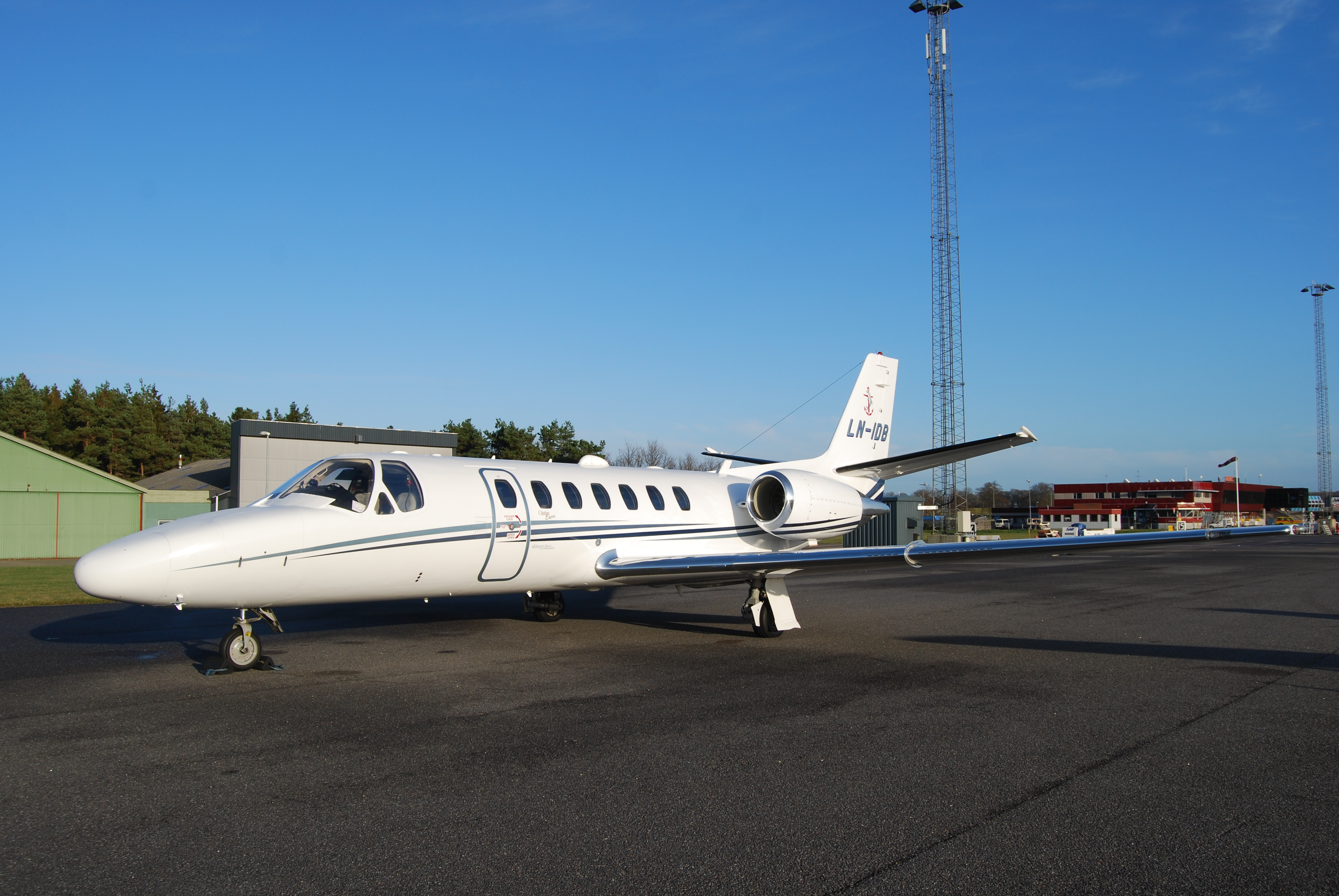
The Company's Cessna Citation Encore C560 LN-IDC/LN-IDB

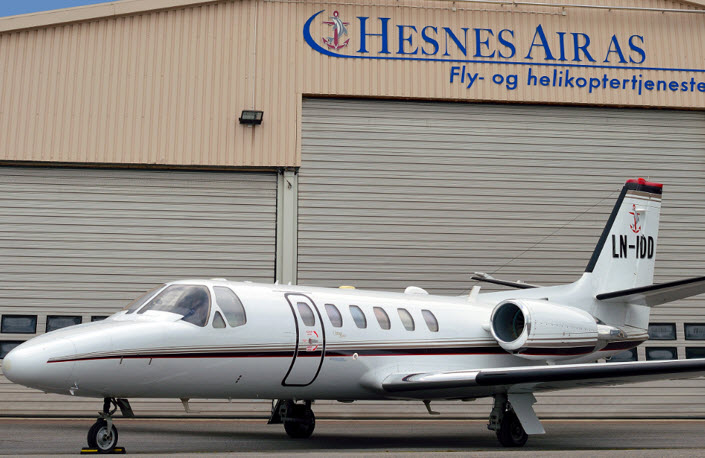
The Company's Cessna Citation Bravo 550 LN-IDD

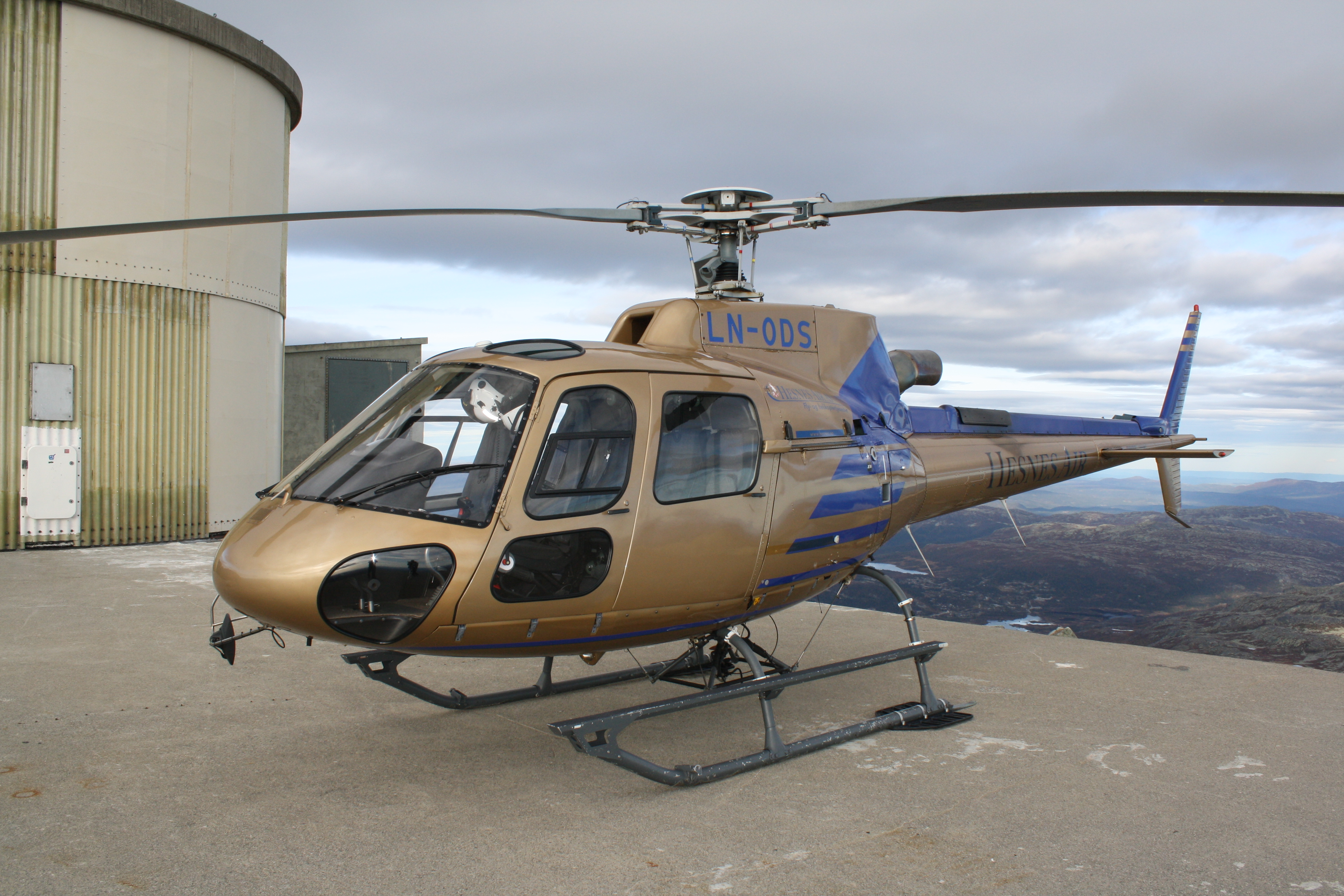
The Company's Eurocopter AS 350 B3 LN-ODS

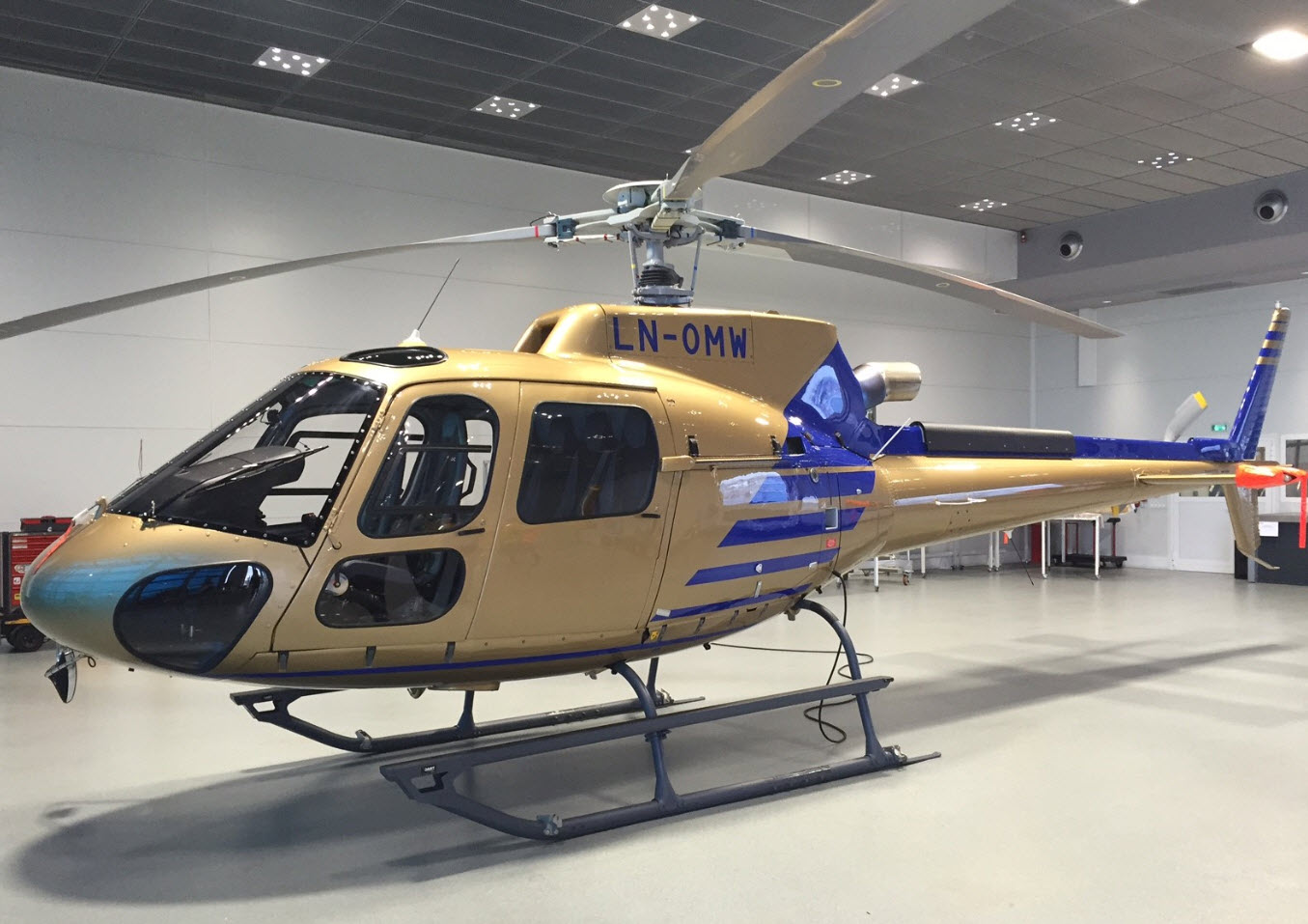
The Company's Eurocopter AS 350 B3 LN-OMW
