= High-speed grinding =

Railway maintenance technique

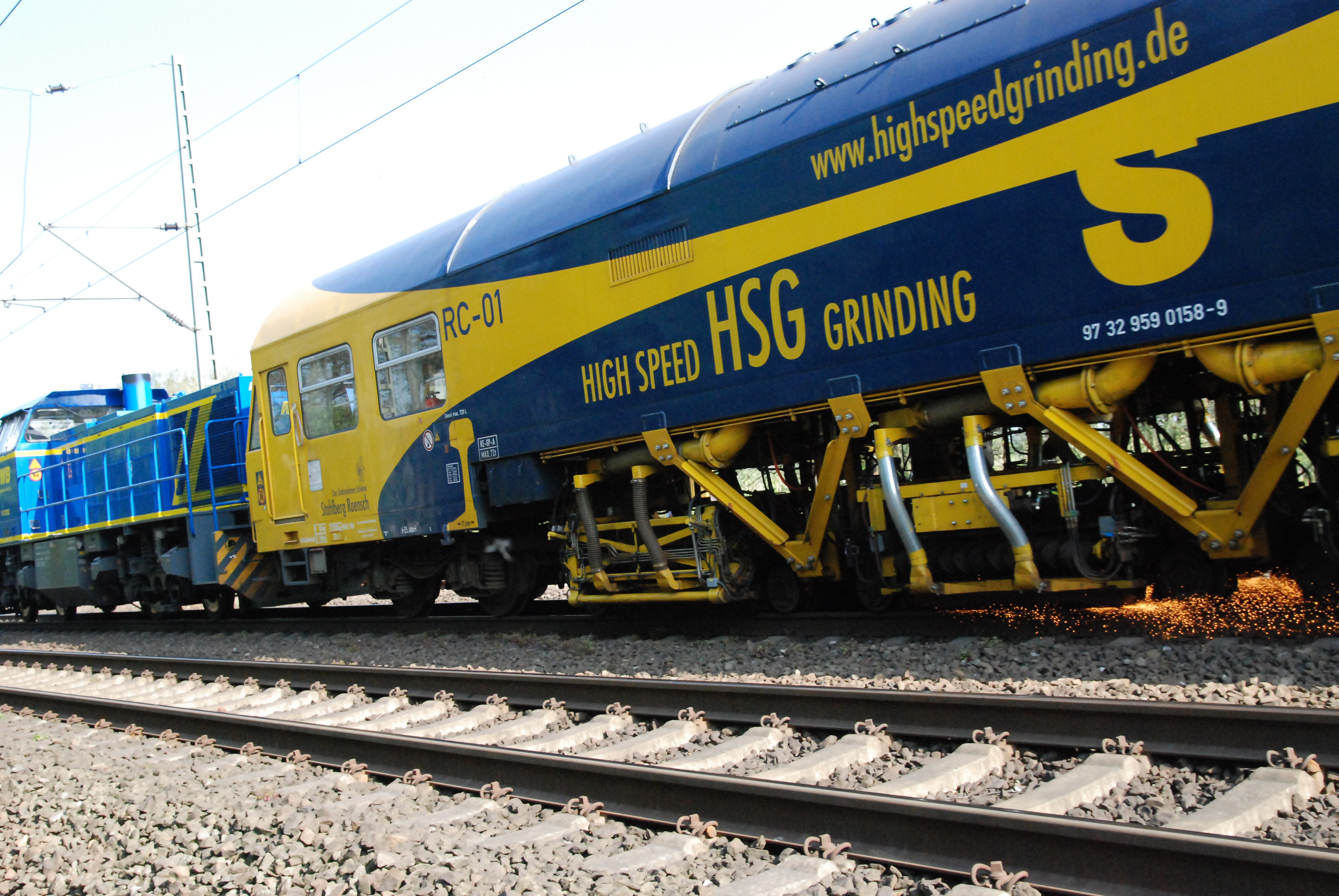
HSG grinding train RC01 in action

High-speed grinding (HSG) is a rail care concept developed by the company Stahlberg Roensch from Seevetal, Germany. It is based on the principle of rotational grinding and serves to grind rails at up to 100 kilometres per hour (62 mph).

== Background ==
Since roughly the beginning of the 1990s, rail network operators have experienced increasing problems with rail surface defects. Head checks, squats, corrugation and slip waves all contribute to higher maintenance costs, intensified noise pollution, traffic obstructions, and ultimately a shortened rail lifespan. These increasingly common flaws are exacerbated by the growing density and speed of both freight and passenger traffic. The direct consequence of these problems is a growing need for rail maintenance.

The primary challenge for modern rail maintenance is that less time is available to perform it due to higher traffic densities. Conventional rail maintenance machines (e.g. rail milling, planing or grinding) working at speeds from 1 to 10 kilometres per hour (0.62 to 6.21 mph) can work only during possession time (track closure) which is in most cases available only at night.

HSG allows for working speeds of up to 100 kilometres per hour (62 mph) and is deployable within regular traffic.

It comes under non-traditional machining operations.

== Principle ==
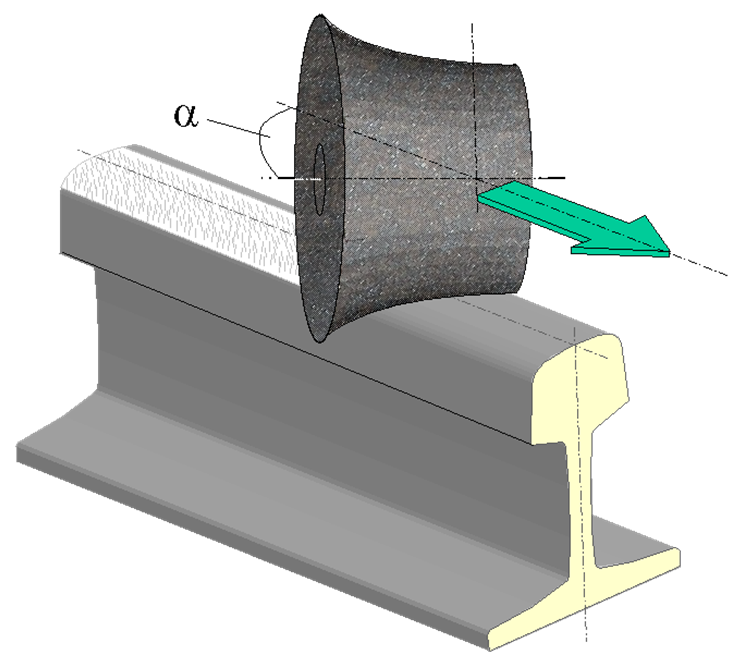
Principle of high-speed grinding

HSG is based on the principle of circumferential grinding. Cylindrical grinding stones are pulled over the rail at an angle, inducing rotation as well as an axial grinding motion. The grinding stones are mounted on grinding units hauled by a carrier vehicle.

Two things are achieved with this motion: First, the required material removal rate is obtained through the relative motion between grinding stone and rail. Second, by rotating the stones, overheating, glazing and uneven wear of the stones is prevented.

The usual grinding speed on Deutsche Bahn's rail network is 80 kilometres per hour (50 mph).

== Implementation ==
Today two machines using HSG technology exist. Both are operated by Stahlberg Roensch. The larger machine, RC01, has four grinding units, each with 24 grinding stones. A smaller machine using one grinding unit with 16 grinding stones is also in use. RC01 is used on main line and high speed tracks of DB Netz AG, while the smaller version is deployed mostly on commuter and metro rail networks.

== Application areas ==
- Preventive rail grinding
- Low-friction coating removal
- Acoustic grinding to reduce noise pollution emitted from the rail
- Removal of the decarb layer
- rail track

== Bibliography ==
- Hiensch, M. and Smulders, J.: Head Check Rißfortschritt in Schienen, Eisenbahntechnische Rundschau, N°. 6 (1999), pages 378-382
- Grassie, S: Riffeln – Gründe und Gegenmaßnahmen, Der Eisenbahningenieur, N°. 46 (1995), pages 714-723
- Lothar Marx, Dietmar Moßmann, Herrmann Kullmann: Arbeitsverfahren für die Instandhaltung des Oberbaus, Eisenbahn-Fachverlag, Heidelberg/Mainz 2003
- Zarembski, Allan M.: The Art and Science of Rail Grinding, Simmons-Boardman Books, Omaha 2005
- Lichterberger, Bernhard: Track Compendium – Formation, Permanent Way, Maintenance, Economics, Eurailpress in DVV Media Group, Hamburg 2005
- Marcel Taubert, Aiko Püschel: High Speed Grinding passes the test in Germany, International Railway Journal, July 2009, S. 31-33
