= Riedlingen derailment =

2025 train accident in Germany

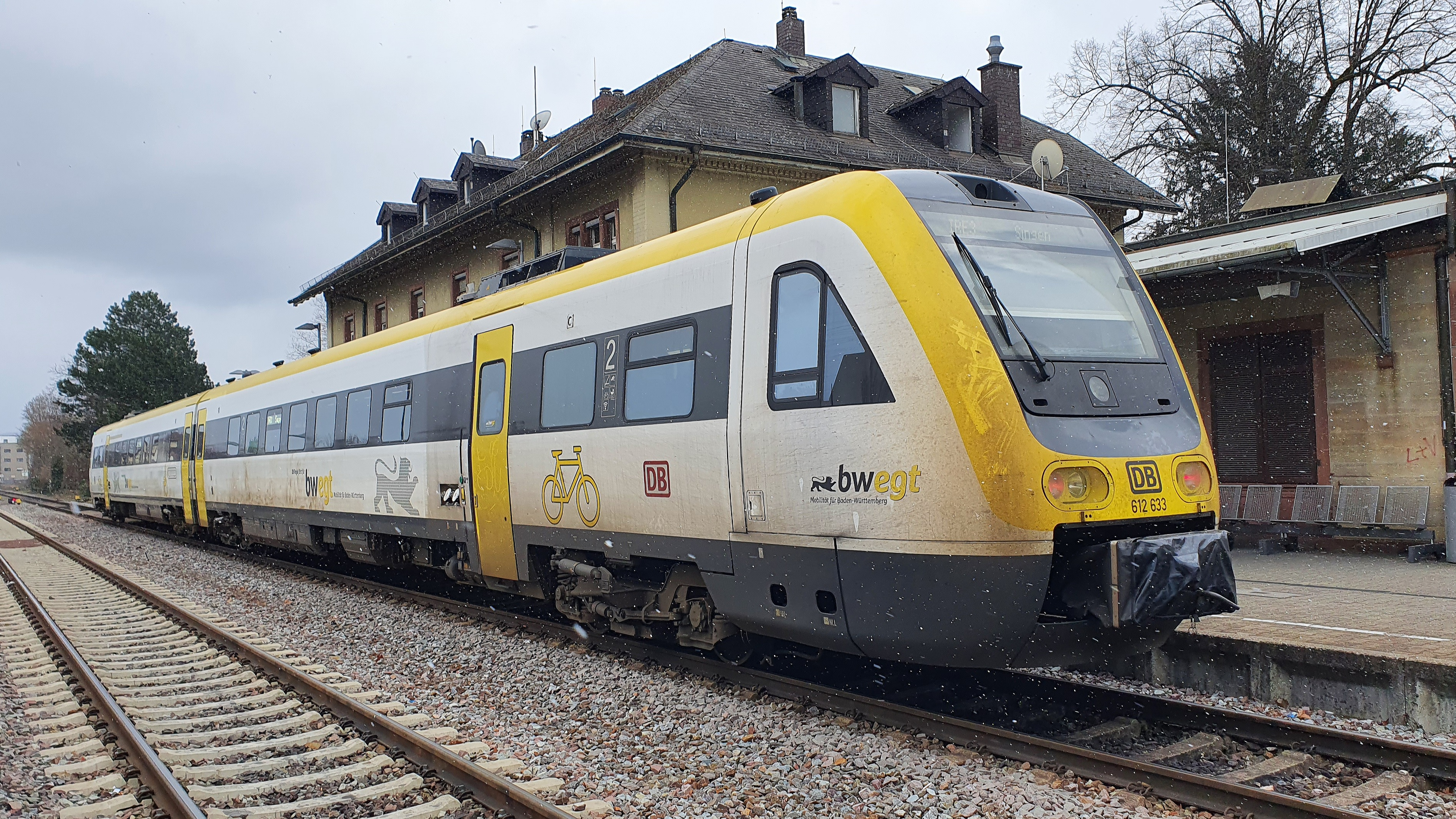
- Derailed train in 2023

Details
- Date: 27 July 2025; 12 months ago 18:10 CEST
- Location: Riedlingen, Biberach, Baden-Württemberg
- Coordinates: 48.2028°N 9.5079°E
- Country: Germany
- Line: Regional-Express 55
- Operator: DB Regio BW
- Service: RE3227
- Incident type: Derailment
- Cause: under investigation

Statistics
- Trains: 1
- Passengers: approx. 50
- Deaths: 3
- Injured: approx. 36

On 27 July 2025, at 18:10 CEST, two train cars of the Regional-Express 55 derailed near Zell, a small village belonging to Riedlingen, Biberach, Germany. Approximately 50 passengers were on board. At least three people, the train driver, a railway trainee and one passenger, were killed and approximately 36 were injured, according to Reutlingen's emergency dispatch center. Investigators were dispatched to the site of the derailment. Thomas Strobl, the minister of the interior for Baden-Württemberg, stated that heavy rainfall could have caused the derailment.

== Background ==
=== Weather ===
The Southern Weather Station (German: Wetterwarte Süd) in Bad Schussenried issued a violet warning, the highest severe weather warning, at 4 p.m., 4 hours before the accident, due to heavy rainfall. A spokesperson for the Deutscher Wetterdienst (German Meteorological Service) said that the area had experienced "extremely heavy rain": the precipitation rate was 50 litres per square meter within an hour.

Usually, such severe weather events are reported to the operations control center of Deutsche Bahn, but a spokesperson for Deutsche Bahn said that it was "impossible in practice" to monitor all 33,000 kilometres (21,000 mi) of the German railway network.

=== Geology and vegetation management ===
The area of the accident was identified in the geoportal of the Federal Railway Authority as being vulnerable to landslides. The accident site was also marked as hazardous in the hazard map of the German Centre for Rail Traffic Research.

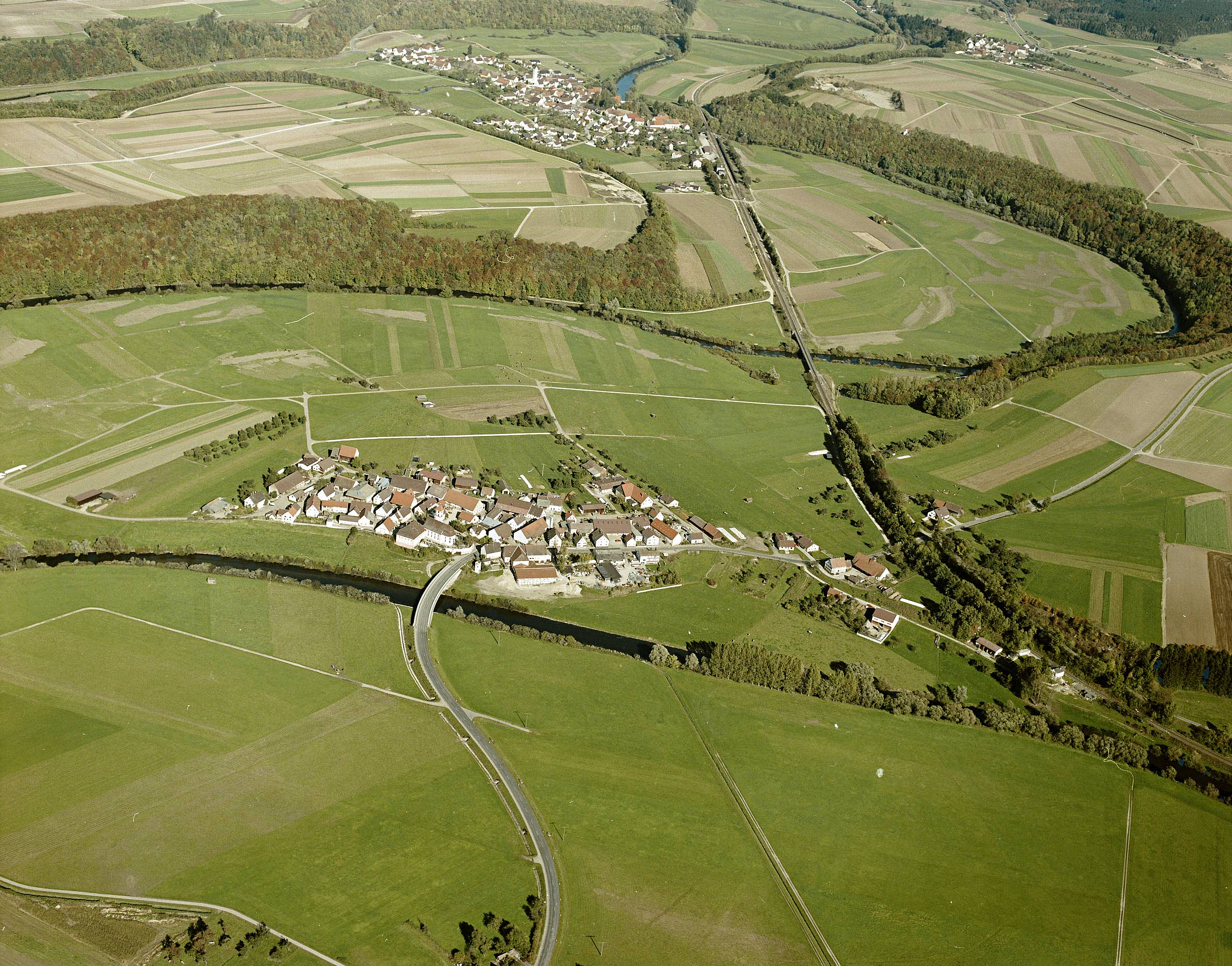
In the center of the picture is the village Zell, the later accident site is in the tree-lined cutting to the right of the village (Aerial view, 1984).

Four years prior to the incident, a simulation of heavy rain produced by a Stuttgart engineering firm showed the accident site being submerged within minutes and the embankment later flooding.

The Biberach district was responsible for the sewage shaft at the site of the incident, the overflow of which played a major role in the accident. According to information released by the district administration after the accident, the drainage systems of Kreisstraße 7545, which is shaft is a part of, were last inspected on 21 July 2025. No blockages were found.

=== Event in the vicinity ===
One hour before the accident, the Riedlingen fire department had to attend to a level crossing on Landesstraße 271 in Zwiefaltendorf, about two kilometres (1.2 mi) from the accident site, because of drainage problems caused by a rainwater shaft clogged with pebbles. Due to the blockage, large amounts of water accumulated in the depression in front of the tracks at the level crossing.

== Accident ==
At about 6:10 p.m. on 27 July 2025, three of the four passenger coaches of a Regional-Express train derailed between Riedlingen station and Rechtenstein station. The train was traveling the RE 55 line between Sigmaringen station and Ulm Hauptbahnhof. According to initial media reports, the train was travelling about 80 km/h in a right-hand curve at the time of the accident. The train ran into washed-up earth masses and derailed, causing the first coach to be pushed up an embankment and collide with a tree, which tore off its front. There were about 50 passengers on the train at the time of the accident, of which 36 were injured and three killed. Those killed in the accident were the 32-year-old train driver, a 36-year-old trainee, and a 70-year-old passenger.

The cause of the accident was found to be a landslide caused by the overflowing sewage shaft. Climate change was cited by Deutsche Welle as a contributing factor, as it increases the frequency of heavy rain.

== Investigation ==
The public prosecutor's office in Ravensburg initiated an inquiry into the deaths of the three killed, which is standard practice for unnatural deaths. A spokesperson for the prosecutor's office said that the investigation is not being conducted because of a specific crime, but to see whether there are any indications that one might have taken place.

The Federal Authority for Railway Accident Investigation started investigations to determine the cause of the accident.

== Reactions ==
In addition to Deutsche Bahn chairman Richard Lutz, several politicians visited the site of the accident, including Winfried Kretschmann, Thomas Strobl, Patrick Schnieder, and Winfried Hermann. They expressed their condolences and pledged to support the investigation. Chancellor Friedrich Merz, Eisenbahn- und Verkehrsgewerkschaft-chairman Martin Burkert, and the French Railway Workers' Federation also expressed condolences.

An ecumenical memorial service was held at the Zwiefalten Abbey church, co-led by the Catholic bishop Klaus Krämer and Evangelical bishop Ernst-Wilhelm Gohl. Politicians Kretschmann, Schnieder, and Hermann were in attendance.

In mid-August 2025, Federal Minister for Transport Patrick Schnieder announced the early dismissal of Lutz due to the "dramatic situation" of Deutsche Bahn. Lutz will continue in his role until a successor is found. According to Politico, Schneider said that the decision, agreed upon with Lutz, was part of a "structural and personnel realignment" at Deutsche Bahn.

== Analysis ==
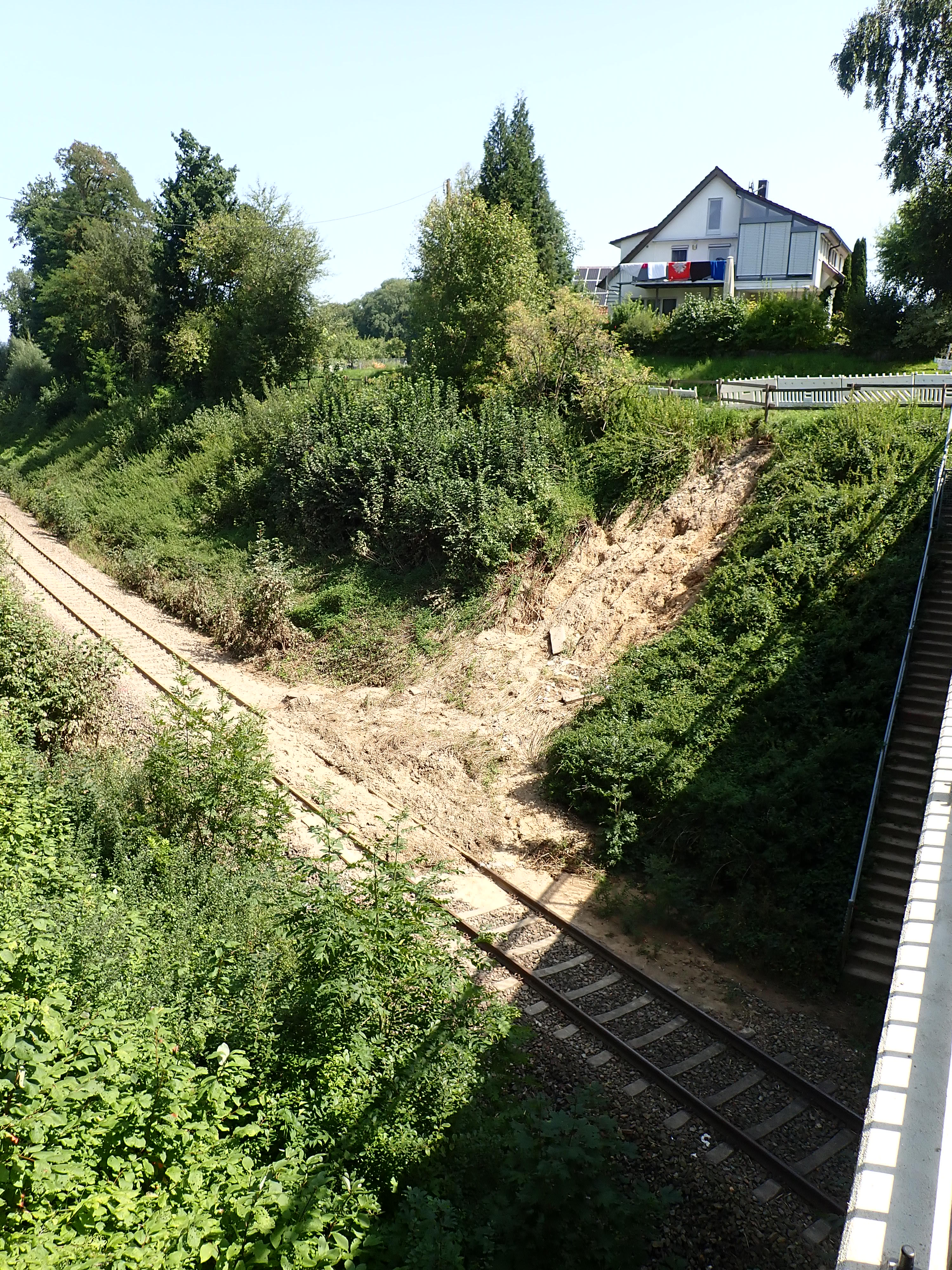
Remnants of the landslide that fell onto the tracks, pictured 17 days after the incident.

Railway engineer Markus Hecht, head of the Department of Rail Vehicles at the Institute of Land and Sea Transport of the Humboldt University of Berlin, criticised Deutsche Bahn. He said that the accident would have been mitigated, or perhaps avoided entirely, if the train was equipped with modern cowcatcher. During modernisation, the DBAG Class 612 was not fitted with modern cowcatchers, and Hecht argued that such a device could have removed the obstacle. He criticised German regulations for not requiring upgrades for older trains, and the rail network usage conditions of DB InfraGO, saying that they do not pay enough attention to modern standards. Due to their lack of winter and snow-clearing technology, many German trains are banned from operating in the Netherlands and Austria. Hecht also recommended that Deutsche Bahn reinforce the embankments along its lines and specifically prepare for extreme weather events such as heavy rain and snowfall. He placed the primary responsibility for the rail accident on Deutsche Bahn.

Geoscientist Michael Krautblatter, Professor of Slope Movements at the Technical University of Munich, warned of more frequent and more severe landslides in Germany due to heavy rainfall. The accident site is located at a geologically unstable stratum, specifically the old glacial deposits from the Riss glaciation on Upper Freshwater Molasse. Stabilising the slope was possible, but doing so would potentially endanger a large amount of areas. The displaced tracks could have been caused by shifts in the track bed caused by the heavy rainfall. According to Krautblatter, there are significant railway lines, especially in the Alpine Foreland, that run through unstable terrain and warned of future similar accidents caused by severe weather events. He called for improved early warning systems, including monitoring down to the millimetre range.

Weather expert Roland Roth, leader of the Southern Weather Station in Bad Schussenried, said that Deutsche Bahn could not have suspended service due to the violet warning because such warnings are issued frequently and it is not possible to predict the locations that will receive the heaviest rainfall. He does not blame Deutsche Bahn and said that the accident was an act of God.

Natural hazards researcher Ugur Öztürk of the University of Vienna said that after his analysis of older images of the slopes at the accident site, he could not find any perceptible clear signs of instability. The area is densely vegetated, so small developing deformations in the slopes are very difficult to detect and often go unnoticed. Another factor is that slopes beside railway lines are frequently artificially cut and can therefore have much steeper angles, which increases the flow velocity of rainwater through the slopes and significantly raises erosion risk. For that reason, the accident site may have been more unstable. While acknowledging that this is speculation, Öztürk suspected that the railway was destabilized by the landslide material and that the trains finally derailed when they continued to run on the displaced tracks. He says a forensic on-site analysis is needed and calls for a change in mindset due to climate change, which increases geotechnical hazards. Given the current condition of the rail infrastructure, he believes the rail accident would have been difficult to prevent and recommends clearly identifying high-risk rail lines and implementing technical monitoring. Öztürk also advocates for improvements in early-warning systems.

Train driver and chairman of the Gewerkschaft Deutscher Lokomotivführer (Union of German Train Drivers) Nico Rebenack criticised cost-cutting measures by the German government and called for more funding for rail infrastructure. He said that the age of the train was not a factor in the accident, since according to him, the staff on older trains are better trained.

== See also ==
- Stonehaven derailment
