= Trams in Germany =

List of German tramway networks

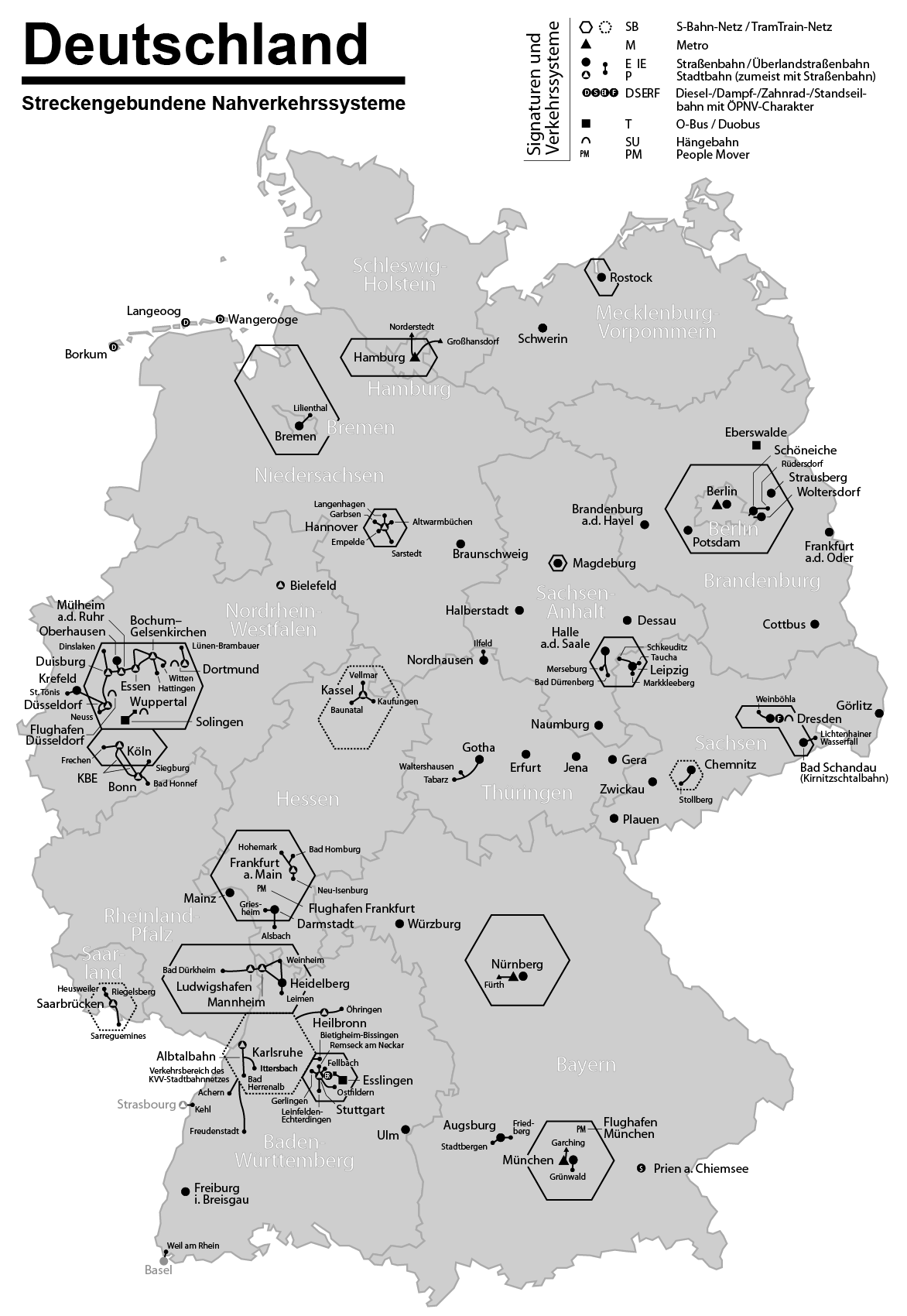
Tram, Stadtbahn, U-Bahn and S-Bahn schemes in Germany

Germany has an extensive number of tramway networks (Straßenbahn in German (German: [ˈʃtʁaːsn̩ˌbaːn])). Some of these networks have been upgraded to light rail standards, called Stadtbahn in German. Straßenbahn and Stadtbahn schemes are usually operated on the legal foundation of the BOStrab, the Tramways Act of Germany.

Tramways served as the primary means of urban transport in Germany until the early 1960s when they were systematically replaced by buses. However, in the 1980s tramways began to reappear; experts spoke of the 'renaissance of the tramway'. In the 1990s tramways had again become a modern means of public transport. Popular notions of fashion have been used by scholars to explain this cycle of acceptance rejection and restoration. Tramways were a highly visible manifestation of commodity culture and people projected onto them not just travel destinations but more broadly their desires, ideas and beliefs.

== Stadtbahn ==
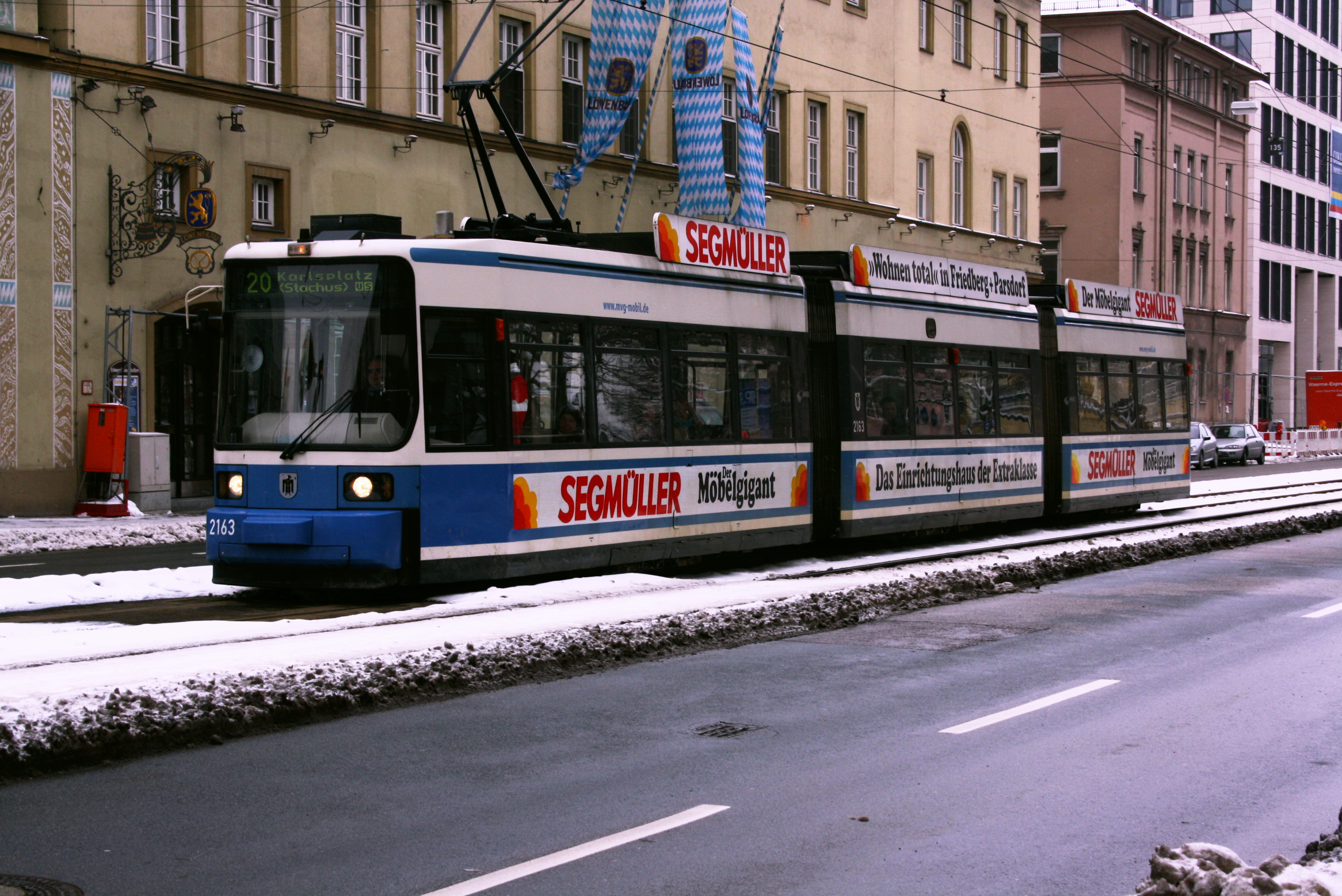
Tram in Munich

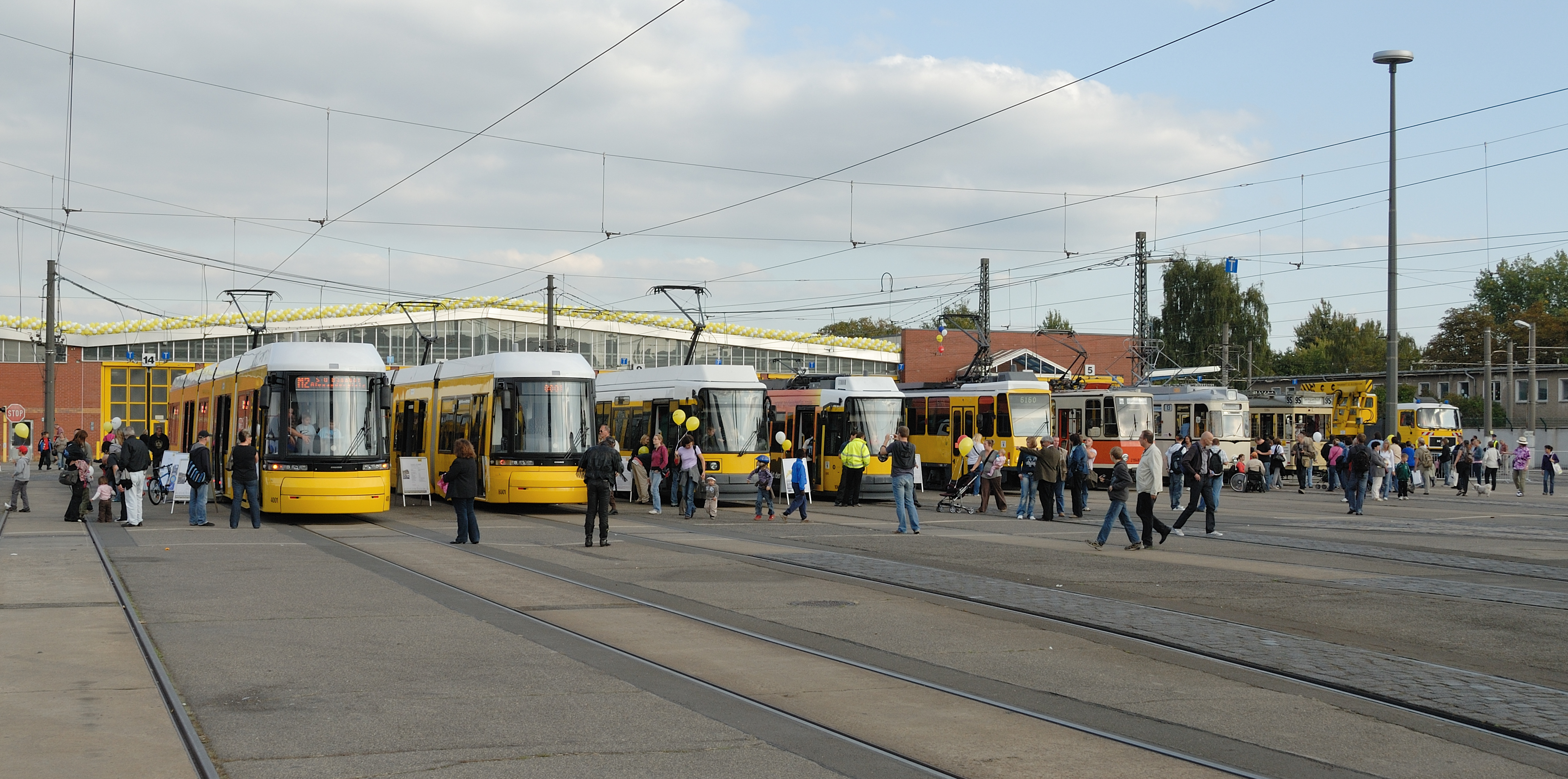
Trams in Berlin

The Stadtbahn is a concept that dates as far back as the late 1940s, when city councils were considering Unterpflasterstraßenbahn (lit. below-pavement tramways) as part of rebuilding the city centres devastated by World War II. Some cities, like Hanover, reserved extra wide medians in their ring roads, though in most cities these plans never progressed past the planning stage. The success of the Berlin and Hamburg U-Bahn systems prompted cities to begin considering such schemes again in the 1960s and 1970s. Munich and Nuremberg decided to fully abolish their trams and started constructing full-scale U-Bahn systems, though to date both cities have retained and subsequently expanded their tram networks. Other cities, such as Hanover and Stuttgart, went for a scheme of city centre tunnels and special right-of-way arrangements with the prospect of converting their tramway networks to a full-fledged U-Bahn over several decades. By the 1980s, virtually all cities had abolished these plans due to the high costs involved with converting the tramways to U-Bahn systems. The most common Stadtbahn systems today are a mixture of tramway-like operations in suburban and peripheral areas, and a more U-Bahn like mode of operation, featuring tunnel stations, in the city centres.

The Stadtbahn scheme is not to be confused with the S-Bahn, which commonly is a suburban railway operating under the Railways Act, while the Stadtbahn typically is an urban railway operating under the Tramways Act.

== Cities and towns with tramway networks ==
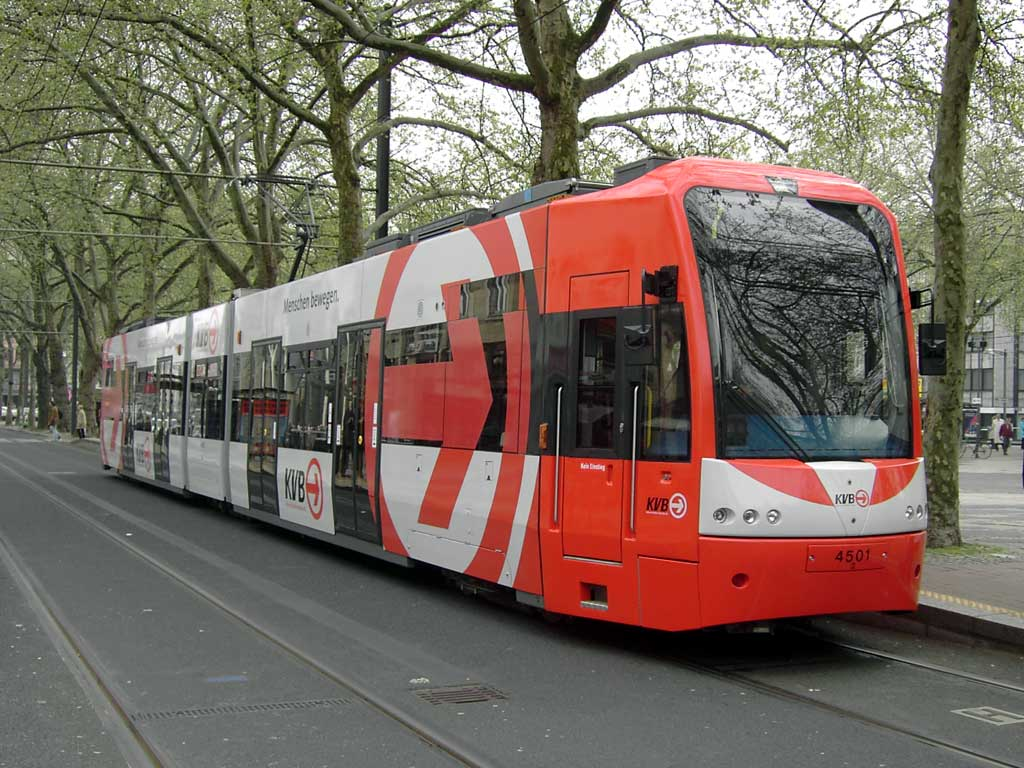
Tram in Cologne

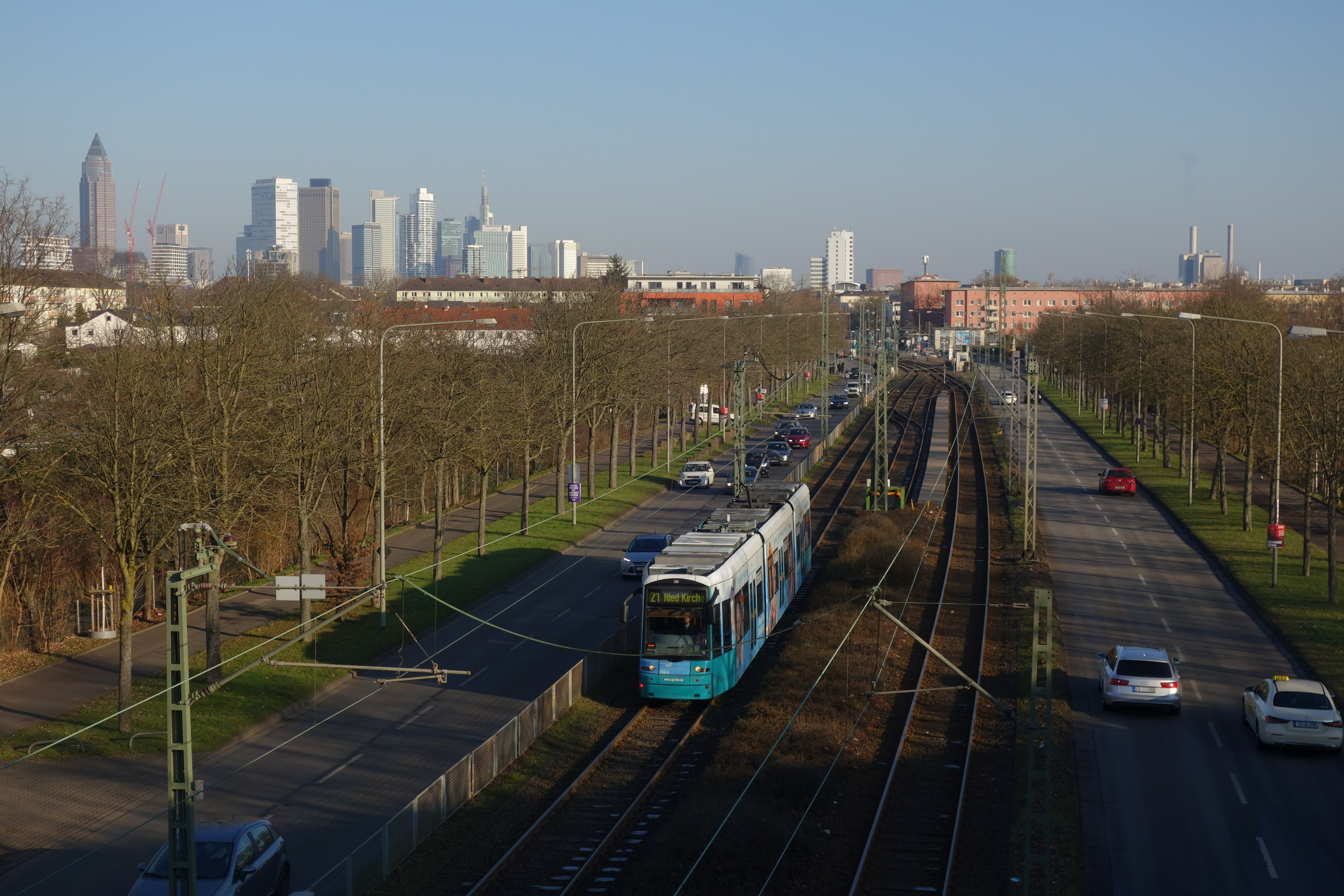
Tram in Frankfurt am Main

- Augsburg
- Bad Schandau
- Berlin
- Bielefeld (Stadtbahn)
- Bochum (Stadtbahn and Tram)
- Bonn (Stadtbahn and Tram)
- Brandenburg an der Havel
- Bremen
- Braunschweig
- Chemnitz
- Cologne (Stadtbahn)
- Cottbus
- Darmstadt
- Dessau
- Dresden
- Dortmund (Stadtbahn)
- Duisburg (Stadtbahn and Tram)
- Düsseldorf (Stadtbahn and Tram)
- Erfurt
- Essen (Stadtbahn and Tram)
- Frankfurt am Main (Stadtbahn and Tram)
- Frankfurt (Oder)
- Freiburg im Breisgau
- Gelsenkirchen
- Gera
- Görlitz
- Gotha
- Halberstadt
- Halle (Saale)
- Hanover (Stadtbahn)
- Hattingen
- Heidelberg
- Herne
- Jena
- Karlsruhe (Tram and Tram-Train)
- Kassel
- Krefeld
- Leipzig
- Ludwigshafen
- Magdeburg
- Mainz
- Mannheim
- Mülheim an der Ruhr
- Munich
- Naumburg
- Nordhausen
- Nürnberg
- Oberhausen
- Plauen
- Potsdam
- Rostock
- Saarbrücken (Stadtbahn)
- Schwerin
- Stuttgart (Stadtbahn)
- Ulm
- Waltershausen
- Witten
- Würzburg
- Zwickau

== Cities that have abolished their trams ==
=== Abolished due to World War II damage ===
This list also includes cities that have been Polish or USSR territory since 1945.

- Emmerich (1903-1944)
- Hanau (1908-1945)
- Hildesheim (1905-1945)
- Küstrin (1903-1923, 1925-1945)
- Landshut (1913-1945)
- Tilsit (1900-1944)
- Warnemünde (1910-1944)
- Wilhelmshaven (1913-1945)

=== Past-1945 ===
- Aachen († September 29, 1974)
- Baden-Baden († February 28, 1951)
- Badenweiler († May 22, 1955)
- Bad Kreuznach († January 5, 1953)
- Berlin (West) (June 22, 1865 - October 2, 1967) reintroduced post reunification on a few lines from the East
- Bingen († October 20, 1955)
- Breckerfeld († November 2, 1963)
- Bremerhaven († July 30, 1982)
- Bückeburg († May 21, 1966)
- Castrop-Rauxel († September 30, 1959)
- Celle († June 2, 1956)
- Detmold († August 15, 1954)
- Dillingen/Saar († May 31, 1957)
- Düren († April 30, 1963)
- Eisenach (August 1, 1897 - December 31, 1975)
- Emden († April 30, 1953)
- Straßenbahn Esslingen - Nellingen - Denkendorf († February 28, 1978)
- Flensburg († June 2, 1973)
- Fürth († June 21, 1981 - replaced by a Subway line)
- Gevelsberg († March 31, 1956)
- Gießen († March 31, 1953)
- Gummersbach († October 4, 1953)
- Hagen († May 29, 1976)
- Hamburg († October 1, 1978 - currently the largest city without trams)
- Hamm († April 2, 1961)
- Hattingen († June 30, 1969)
- Heilbronn († April 1, 1955 - reopened July 21, 2001)
- Herford († April 22, 1966)
- Herne († September 30, 1959)
- Hohenstein-Ernstthal-Oelsnitz (Erzg.) (February 15, 1913 - March 26, 1960)
- Idar-Oberstein († July 29, 1956)
- Iserlohn († December 31, 1959)
- Kassel, Herkulesbahn († April 12, 1966)
- Kiel († May 4, 1985)
- Kleve († March 31, 1962)
- Klingenthal (May 27, 1917 - April 4, 1964)
- Koblenz († July 19, 1967)
- Kreischa (October 18, 1977)
- Kreuztal († May 29, 1952)
- Lörrach († August 31, 1967)
- Lübeck († November 15, 1959)
- Marburg († May 17, 1951)
- Mettmann († May 17, 1952)
- Minden († December 29, 1959)
- Moers († September 25, 1954)
- Mönchengladbach († March 15, 1969)
- Mühlhausen (December 21, 1898 - June 27, 1969)
- Müllheim († May 22, 1955)
- Münster († November 25, 1954)
- Neunkirchen (Saar) († June 10, 1978)
- Neuss († independent operation on August 7, 1971 - city's territory still served by Rheinbahn lines)
- Neuwied († October 31, 1950)
- Niedersedlitz (October 18, 1977)
- Oberhausen († October 13, 1968 - last line of Vestische Straßenbahnen to Bottrop out of service in 1974; reintroduced tramway service to Mülheim in 1996)
- Offenbach am Main († May 27, 1967, one line remained part of the Frankfurt network until 1996)
- Opladen-Lützenkirchen († July 11, 1955)
- Opladen-Ohligs/Höhscheid († July 10, 1955)
- Osnabrück († May 29, 1960)
- Paderborn († September 27, 1963)
- Pforzheim († October 10, 1964)
- Plettenberg (Dampfstraßenbahn † January 1, 1959 (freight traffic until 1962))
- Ravensburg-Weingarten-Baienfurt († February 23, 1959)
- Recklinghausen († December 30, 1982)
- Rees († April 30, 1966)
- Regensburg († August 1, 1964)
- Remscheid († April 10, 1969)
- Reutlingen († October 19, 1974)
- Rheydt († January 31, 1959 (freight traffic until 1964))
- Saarbrücken († May 22, 1965)
- Saarlouis (+ February 28, 1961)
- Schwelm († March 31, 1956)
- Schwetzingen († 1974)
- Siegen († August 31, 1958)
- Siegburg-Troisdorf-Zündorf († August 31, 1965)
- Solingen († November 15, 1959)
- Staßfurt (April 10, 1900 - December 31, 1957)
- Stralsund (March 25, 1900 - April 7, 1966)
- Sylt (+ December 29, 1970)
- Teltow (1891 - November 1, 1961)
- Trier (July 27, 1890 / October 14, 1905 - September 14, 1951)
- Unna-Kamen-Werne († December 15, 1950)
- Völklingen (September 3, 1909 - April 18, 1959)
- Wahn (May 6, 1917 - October 1, 1961)
- Walldorf (February 22, 1902 / February 22, 1907 - August 1, 1954)
- Wesel († April 30, 1966)
- Wiesbaden († April 30, 1955)
- Elektrische Straßenbahn Heidelberg - Wiesloch († 1973)
- Worms (December 6/22, 1906 - January 29, 1956)
- Wuppertal
  († May 30, 1987 (1,435 mm (4 ft 8 1/2 in) gauge))
  († July 31, 1970 (1,000 mm (3 ft 3 3/8 in) gauge))

== Vehicles ==
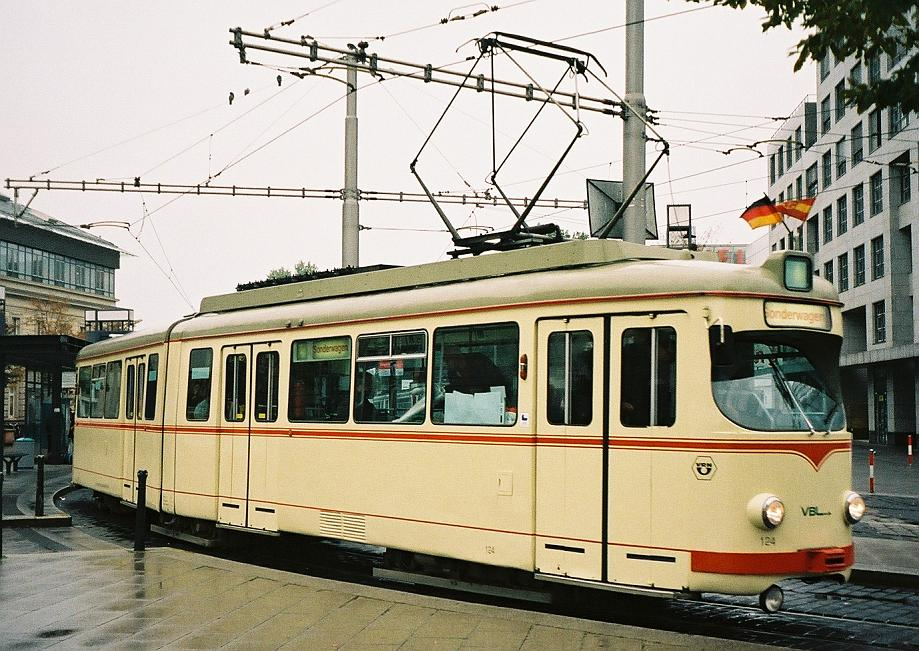
Historic 6-axle Duewag articulated tram car

The most common vehicle type currently in use in Germany is the articulated tram, either in its high floor or low floor variant. Articulated trams are tram cars that consist of several sections held together by flexible joints. Like articulated buses, they have an increased passenger capacity. These trams can be up to forty metres in length, while a regular tram has to be much shorter.

=== Articulated trams ===
==== History ====
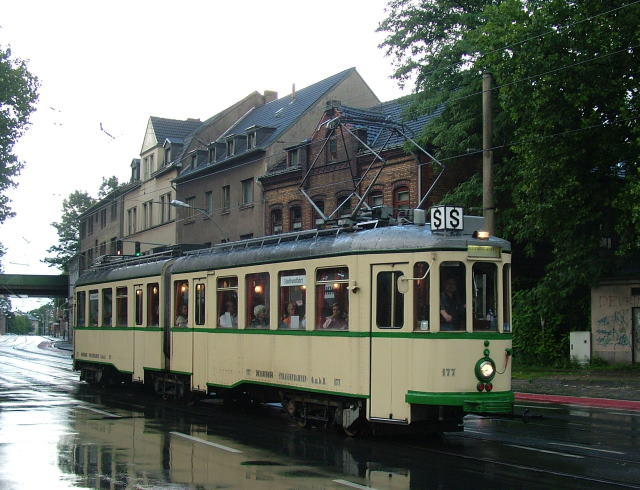
1926 prototype from Duisburg

From 1918 on, a few prototypes were built in Germany, for example a trailer car for Dresden in 1918 and two tramcars with Jacobs bogies for Duisburg in 1926. However, interest for these cars was low and the concept of articulation fell into obscurity.

It was only after World War II that articulated cars were manufactured again; the first, small series of GT4 cars was deployed for Stuttgart in 1953 by Maschinenfabrik Esslingen. From 1956 on, Duewag manufactured large numbers of articulated tram cars for operators in Germany and abroad to replace old pre-war models.

Starting in 1959, Maschinenfabrik Esslingen and Hansawaggon, the latter mainly in Bremen and in Munich, tried to get into the market with their Kurzgelenkwagen construction — however, in West Germany their market share remained small compared to the Jacobs bogie cars made by Düwag. The Hansawaggon design was copied later by CKD Tatra, which manufactured large numbers of KT4D tram cars based on this design for use in the GDR.

Apart from the larger series, small numbers of cars were rebuilt for operators with odd requirements, for example the Bremer Straßenbahn AG received a series of 3-axled and Augsburg bought several 5-axled cars.

In the 1970s, the first urban railway cars were developed in the Federal territory. In some cases, tried and tested tram types were modified in such a way that they were also suitable for elevated platforms; While long-distance articulated wagons with a trajectory of curves were built for Frankfurt and Hanover, the Stuttgart tram was followed by the opposite route, although a number of Stuttgart lines were also used as a conventional tram. In their first versions, the new Stuttgart double-wagon consisted of two four-axle single-wagons without a transition, and their bogies were much further apart than with classic streetcar trucks.

In the 1990s, high-pressure low-floor trains were developed. In part, considerable changes were noticeable after large numbers of units were already in use. Also some older articulated cars were improved after 1990 with a low-floor segment. In order to avoid problems with low-floor technology, there are also new designs that are not completely low-floor, such as the Flexity Swift, developed for Cologne since 1995, whose axle distribution with four wheels is firmly developed underneath a short middle segment from a conventional articulated carriage type of the Zurich tram, the middle segment of which, however, has an exterior door. A pioneer in the development of Regiotram is Karlsruhe.

Since 2000, the low-floor technology have been increasingly improved. Since 2001, the market leader Bombardier has been producing eight-axle three-piece rather than six-axle single-axle engines. And as successor model of the ADtranz low floor tram, is the Flexity Berlin. Particularly long-range low-floor articulation trains are built for the Dresden transport companies. At a time when low-floor technology is already almost standard, on the other hand the railways as RegioTrams also use railways, tramway vehicles (increasingly known as tramway vehicles) have to fulfill contradictory requirements.

==== Kurzgelenkwagen ====
Kurzgelenkwagen is a German term meaning short-articulated tramcar. These articulated cars require olnly one bogie per carbody. Initially, they were mostly of the GT4 type; a German acronym for an articulated (G for Gelenk = "joint") motorized (T for Triebwagen) tramcar with 4 axles. Two different models of these have been deployed: Type Stuttgart and Type Bremen. This concept found another use in three- and four-part low floor trams built since 1989, however a special track layout is necessary for these trams, as they have the tendency to swerve in curves. MAN and Adtranz delivered these vehicles to Bremen, Berlin, Munich and Nuremberg; Duewag built a series of 40 for Frankfurt am Main (Type R).

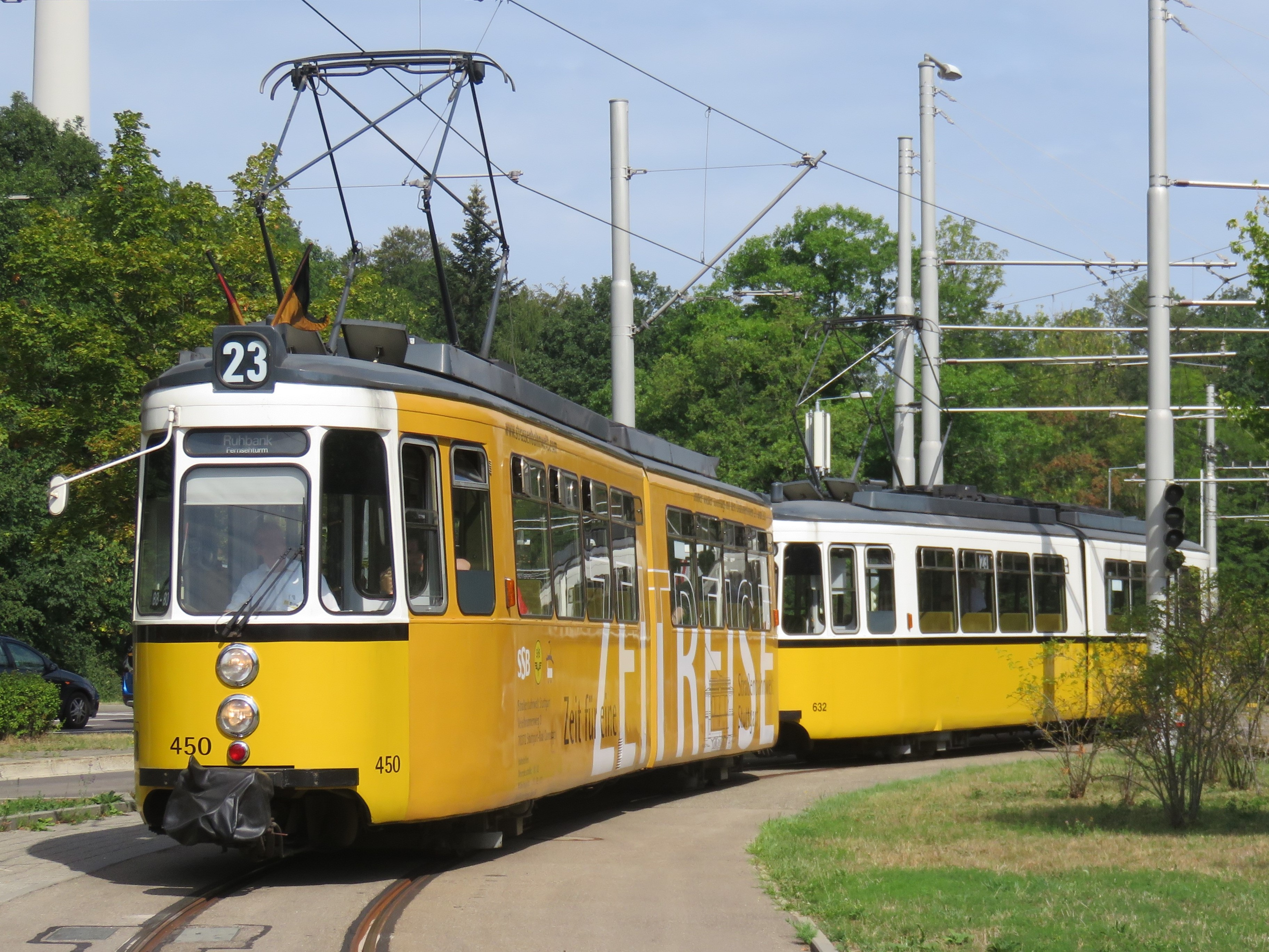
GT4 in Stuttgart

===== Type Stuttgart =====
The GT4, developed by Maschinenfabrik Esslingen in 1959 for the Stuttgart tramways' steep lines connects the two bogies with a girder. The car bodies support themselves by resting on their bogie and on the girder. It therefore is not possible to separate the vehicle's individual cars. 380 cars were built in total, of which 350 were delivered to Stuttgart. Further cars were in use in Freiburg im Breisgau, Reutlingen, Neunkirchen as well as Ulm and Augsburg (which bought them used from Stuttgart), after German reunification used GT4 vehicles were also used in Nordhausen, Halberstadt and Halle.

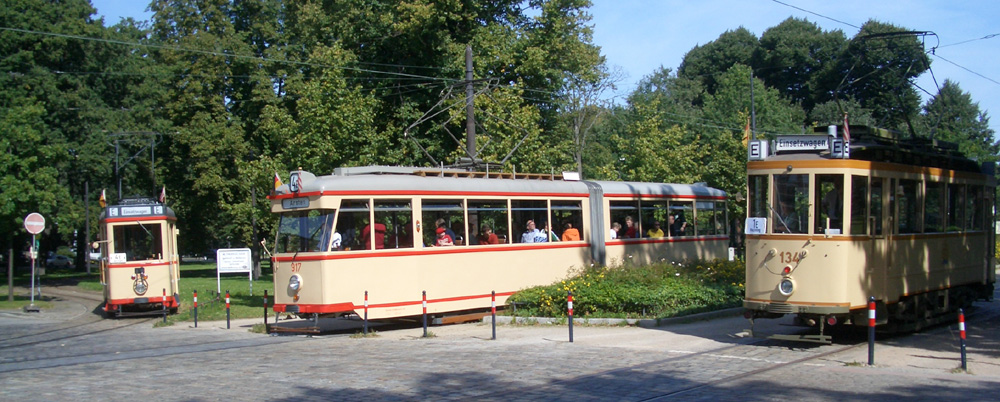
BSAG cars

===== Type Bremen =====
The Hansa Waggonbau GT4 cars, designed and built for Bremer Straßenbahn AG, rest on the individual carbody's bogie only. The joint is not supported, and sections can be added and removed in the workshop. Hansawaggon delivered articulated power cars and trailers to the tramways of Bremen and Bremerhaven, the Munich-based manufacturer Rathgeber bought these cars under licence for the Munich tramways.

===== Tatra KT4 =====
The Czechoslovak company ČKD Tatra developed the KT4D tram car based on the same joint and bogie concept as the Type Bremen and delivered it in large numbers to the GDR from 1975. These cars, used in East Berlin and a number of other cities, were only manufactured as power cars, however they can run as multiple units.

== See also ==
- Transportation in Germany
- Rail transport in Germany
- Stadtbahn
- U-Bahn
- Tram
- List of town tramway systems in Germany
