= GT4 =

GT4 or GT-Four may refer to:

== Automotive ==
- SRO GT4, a sports car racing category
  - ADAC GT4 Germany, a German-based sports car championship
  - Dutch GT4 Championship, a Dutch sports car championship
  - GT4 America Series, a North American sports car championship
  - GT4 Australia, an Australian sports car championship
  - GT4 European Series, a European sports car championship
- Ferrari GT4
- Porsche Cayman GT4
  - Porsche 981 Cayman GT4
  - Porsche 718 Cayman GT4
- Toyota Celica GT-Four

== Other uses ==
- Gran Turismo 4, a 2004 PlayStation 2 racing video game
- GT4 (tram), a design of articulated tram which has two bogies and two body sections, and specifically:
  - GT4 (Bremen), a model of GT4 tram used in the German city of Bremen
  - Maschinenfabrik Esslingen GT4, a model of GT4 tram used in Stuttgart and other German cities
  - Denel GT-4, a South African 76mm cannon used on the Rooikat
