= Eisenbahn-Bau- und Betriebsordnung für Schmalspurbahnen =

The Eisenbahn-Bau- und Betriebsordnung für Schmalspurbahnen ("Ordinance on the Construction and Operation of Narrow-Gauge Railways" / narrow-gauge railway regulations), abbreviated as ESBO, is a German law regulation governing the field of narrow gauge railway operations.

The orders are enacted by the Federal Ministry of Transport based on enabling act through the General Railway Law ("Allgemeinen Eisenbahngesetz", first issued on 29. March 1951). The supervisory authority is delegated to the Federal Railway Authority of Germany.

The ESBO is based directly on the provisions of the EBO main railway regulations referencing its definitions and regulations. While the EBO concentrates on standardization for transport on national and international level the ESBO allows more options for regional and local systems that are technically incompatible to other railways. Apart from giving an extended list of prescriptions it allows non-mentioned areas to follow the global envelope of Anerkannte Regeln der Technik ("Recognized Rules of Technology" roughly to follow "Established Technology Patterns") which is a legal term being more narrow than the "state of the art in technology" (Stand der Technik).

While many of its systems would be governed by Light Railways Act 1896 in the UK it has a different scope so that standard gauge and meter gauge systems in Germany are usually governed by BOStrab light railway regulations that is otherwise modelled for tramways as the operations instructions for BOStrab differ more from EBO than ESBO from EBO.

== See also ==
- Narrow gauge railways in Germany
- Feldbahn for non-public narrow-gauge systems
- Parkeisenbahn for public miniature railways
