= Salander =

Salander is a surname. Notable people with the surname include:

- Corinna Salander (born 1967) is a German physicist and engineer
- Lawrence Salander (born 1949), American art dealer convicted of fraud
- Marie Salander (born 1985), Swedish footballer
- Rikard Salander (born 1981), Swedish politician for the Green Party
- Sven Salander (1894–1965), Swedish Army lieutenant general

== Fictional characters ==
- Lisbeth Salander, a character in the Millennium series by Stieg Larsson
