= Pioniereisenbahn =

Children's railways in Germany

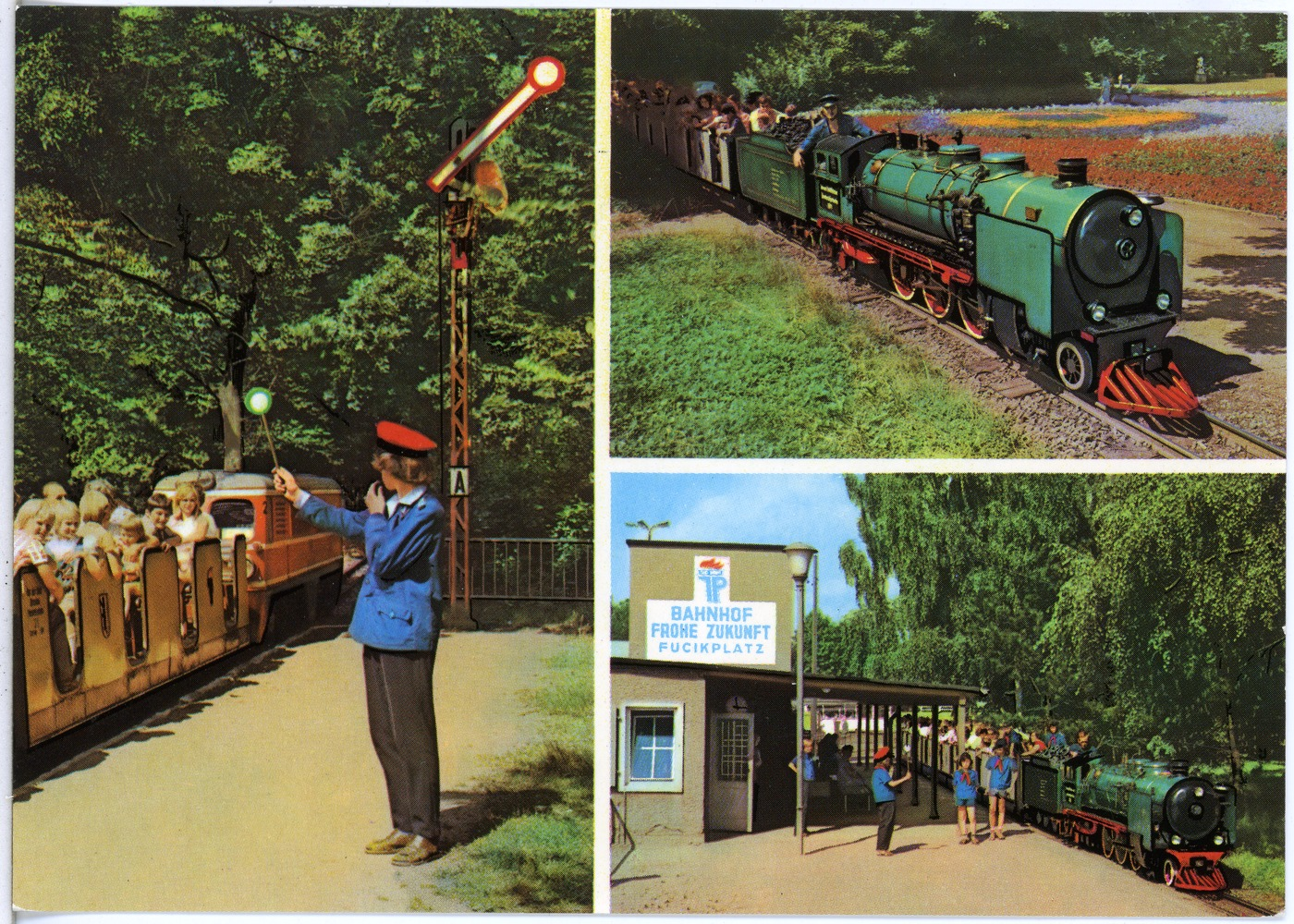
Postcard of Pioniereisenbahn Dresden, 1977

Pioniereisenbahn (Pioneer Railway) is the German term for a narrow gauge railway operated by children in the countries of Comecon. The children who work there in their free time were interested in rail transport and often members of the Junge Pioniere or the Freie Deutsche Jugend, called Pioniere (pioneers). The children and teenagers became acquainted with the railroad's occupations and get practical experiences. Also apprentices of the Deutsche Reichsbahn were taught signal technique there.

Today they are often called Parkeisenbahn or Kindereisenbahn but the principle is the same. Examples for German pioneer railways can be found at List of children's railways.
