= Stadtbahn =

Types of railway class

Stadtbahn logo as used in North Rhine-Westphalia

Stadtbahn (German pronunciation: [ˈʃtatˌbaːn]; German for 'city railway'; plural Stadtbahnen) is a German word referring to various types of urban rail transport. One type of transport originated in the 19th century, firstly in Berlin and followed by Vienna, where rail routes were created that could be used independently from other traffic.

In the 1960s and 1970s, Stadtbahn networks were created again but now by upgrading tramways or light rail lines. This process includes adding segments built to rapid transit standards – usually as part of a process of conversion to a metro railway – mainly by the building of metro-grade tunnels in the central city area. In the first years after the opening of the tunnel sections, often regular trams vehicles (but adapted for tunnel service) were used. These trams were followed by specially designed vehicles like the Stadtbahn B series. By the 1980s virtually all cities had abandoned the long-term goal of establishing a full-scale metro system due to the excessive costs associated with converting the tramways. Most Stadtbahn systems are now a mixture of tramway-like operations in suburban and peripheral areas and a more metro-like mode of operation in city centres, with underground stations. This 20th century Stadtbahn concept eventually spread from Germany to other European countries, where it became known as pre-metro.

== History ==
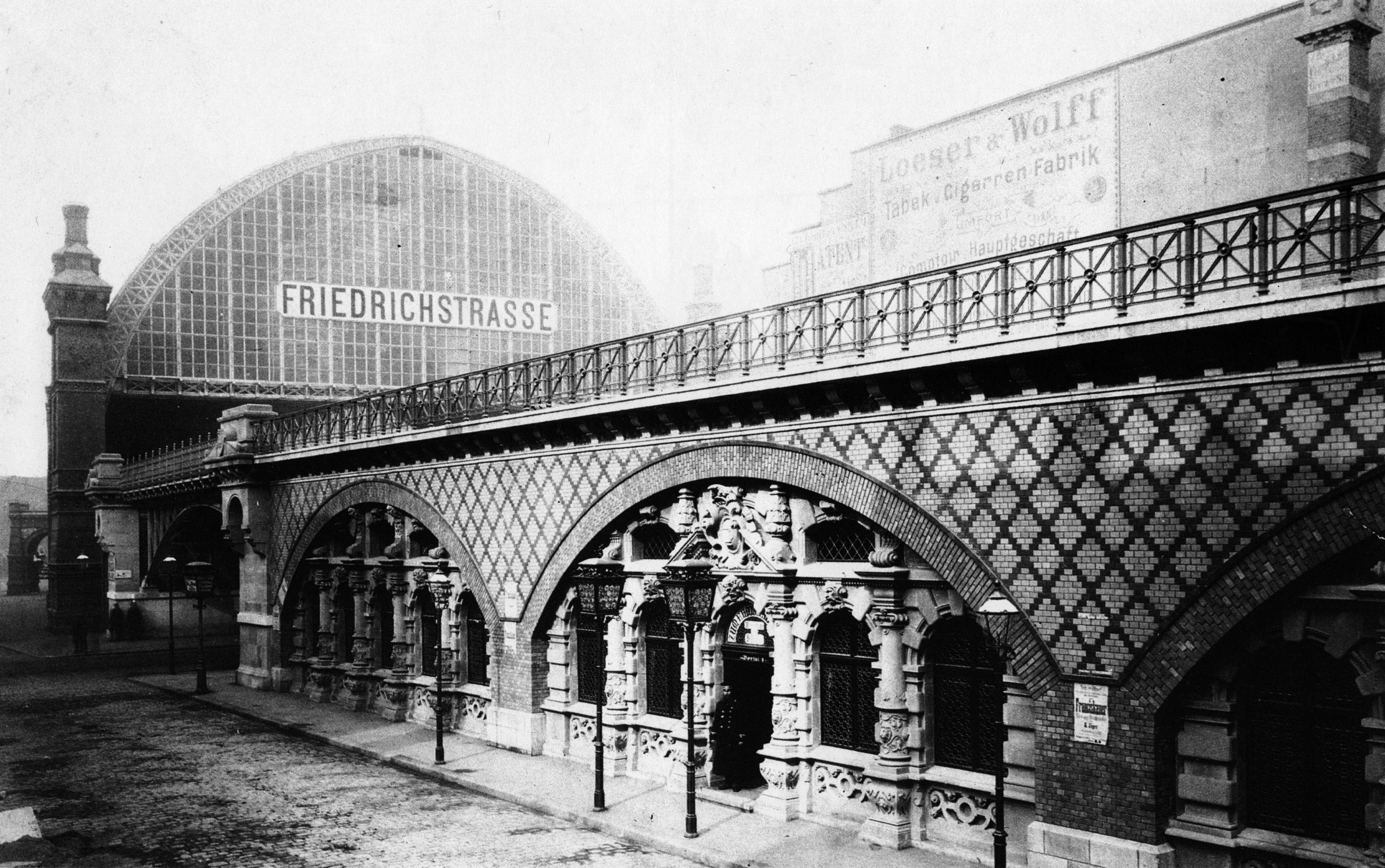
Berlin Friedrichstraße station in 1885

=== 1920s: Berlin and Vienna cross-city lines ===
The term Stadtbahn first arose in the first half of the 20th century as a name for the 19th century built cross-city lines in Berlin and Vienna. The Berlin Stadtbahn line is an elevated heavy rail line linking the East and the West. Long distance, regional, suburban, and urban services (S-Bahn) are operated on it. In Berlin unqualified use of the term Stadtbahn is still widely understood to refer to the Berlin Stadtbahn.

The Vienna Stadtbahn was in the beginning a system of heavy rail lines circling the city, free of level crossings, operated by steam trains. After World War I the Wiental, Donaukanal and Gürtel lines were converted into an electric light rail system with tram-like two-axle cars (which on line 18G until 1945 switched into the tram network at Gumpendorfer Strasse station). In the 1970s to 1990s the infrastructure was updated, and the lines were partially relocated: they are now part of the Vienna U-Bahn services 'U4' and 'U6'. The Vorortelinie line remained heavy rail and is now part of the Vienna S-Bahn.

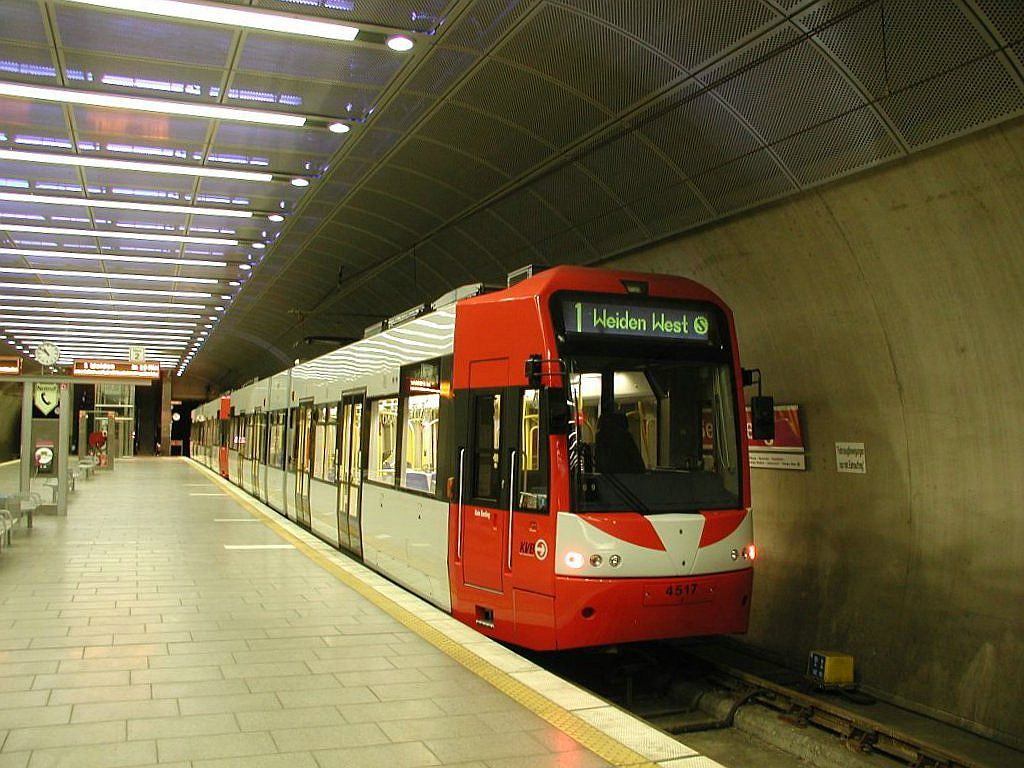
Cologne Stadtbahn at Bensberg in 2005

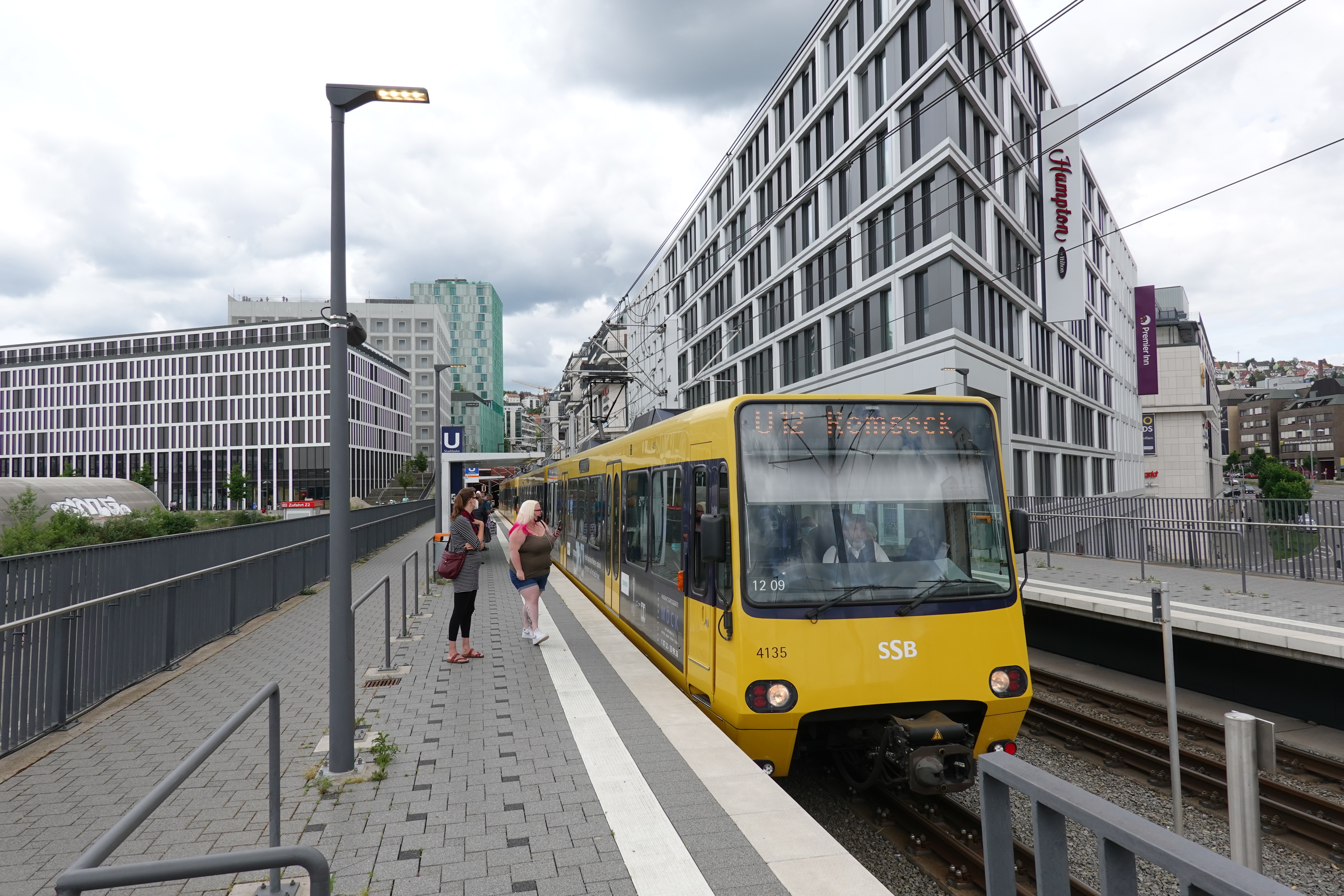
A Stuttgart Stadtbahn train in 2022

=== 1960s: modern Stadtbahn ===
Since the 1960s the term Stadtbahn has become identified with a second, now dominant, meaning. Here Stadtbahn is an underground urban rail network that is used by conventional trams but planned at the outset to be eventually converted into a metro system. A final metro system may or may not be implemented in the end. This concept has the benefit of being cheaper in comparison with constructing a metro from scratch.

Post-World War II transport policies in West German cities aimed for a separation of public and private transport. The conflicts that arose between increasing car usage and the existing tramway systems led to the so-called 'second level' concept for future light rail schemes. This concept focused on the grade separation, i.e., elevation and/or tunneling of tram lines.

Munich and Nuremberg decided to build pure, full-scale U-Bahn (metro) systems. Berlin and Hamburg planned expansions of their existing U-Bahn networks, while most West German cities decided to upgrade their tramway networks step by step, linking new 'second level' infrastructure to existing sections. While some cities regarded this solution as an interim step that would lead to a fully separated U-Bahn (metro) network independent of other forms of transport, others planned for a lesser degree of separation, one that would accommodate additional tram-like sections in the long run. For both the interim and the long-term based concepts, the following terms came into use Untergrund-Straßenbahn, abbreviated as U-Straßenbahn or U-Strab ('underground tramway'), Schnellstraßenbahn ('rapid tramway'), and finally Stadtbahn. An older term already used in the 1920s is "Unterpflasterbahn" ('sub-pavement train'); this term has fallen almost entirely out of use by the 21st century. In French-speaking regions (particularly Wallonia and the bilingual Brussels Capital Region), these concepts were labelled "pre-metro", stressing their – then-planned and advertised – interim nature. All German cities that had a "true" U-Bahn network had plans to abandon their tramway network at one point or another. In the case of Hamburg, those plans resulted in the shutdown of the Hamburg tramway by 1978. In the case of Berlin, the network in West Berlin was shut down in 1967 while the plans to shut down the system in East Berlin were reversed and ultimately the tram network started expanding again in the last years of East Germany; it now serves some portions of the former West again. In Nuremberg and Munich the plans to shut down the tram networks were slowed down – in part due to protests by citizens against losing tram service without adequate replacement – ultimately abandoned and there are now plans for new tram construction in both cities. However, as late as 2011 the tram line through Pirckheimer Straße in Nuremberg was shut down in the course of the opening of a new section of subway line U3 which runs slightly to the North.

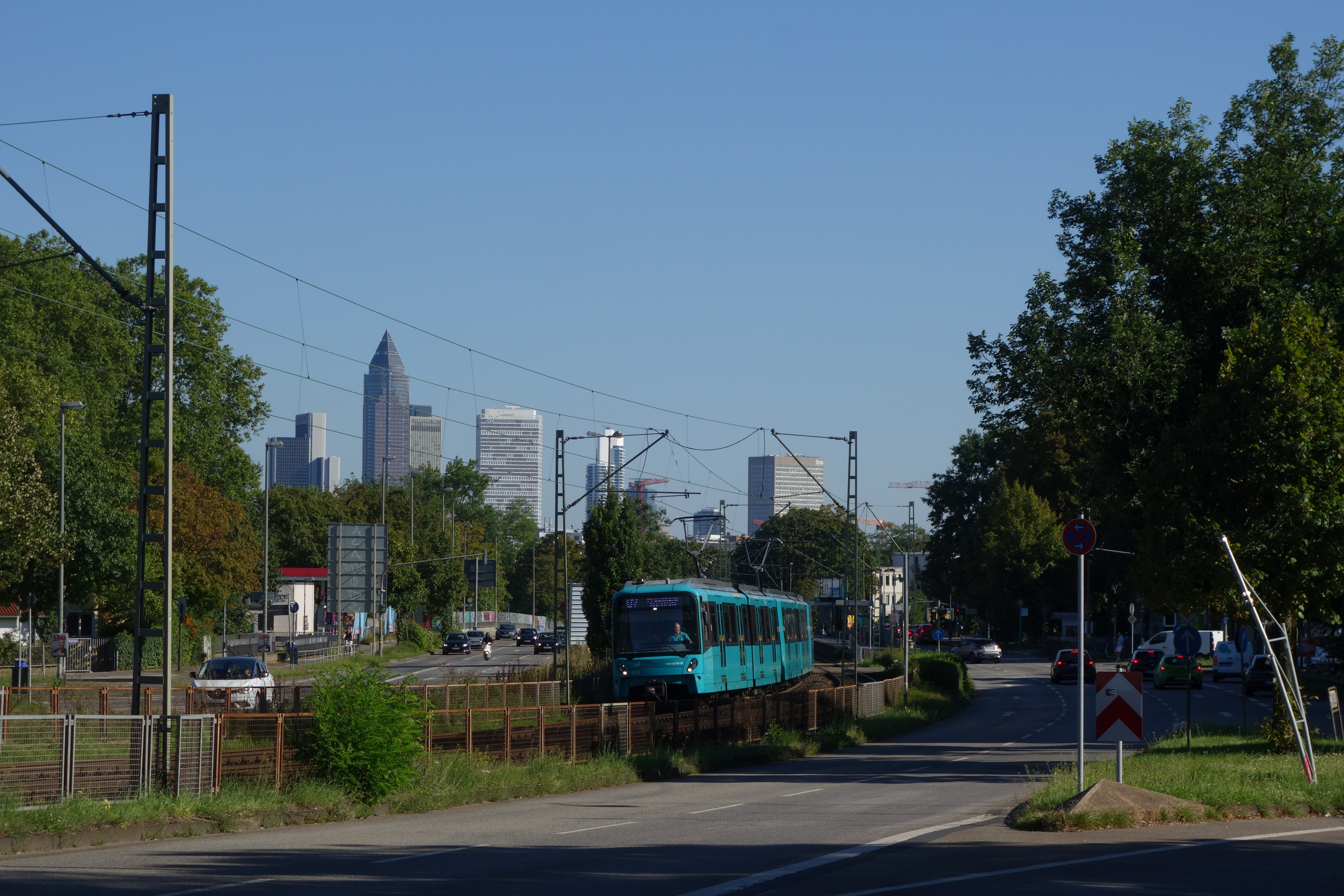
U-Bahn line U7 running as a Stadtbahn amidst Ludwig-Landmann-Straße in Frankfurt-Rödelheim

Some operators and cities decided to identify the term Stadtbahn with the eventual goal of installing an U-Bahn so that both the original U-Bahn logo (e.g. Frankfurt U-Bahn, Cologne Stadtbahn, Hanover Stadtbahn) and the derived U-Stadtbahn logos (e.g. North Rhine-Westphalia, Stuttgart Stadtbahn; see example above) mark station entries and stops. The numbering scheme for Stadtbahn services was prefixed with a 'U', except in the Cologne Stadtbahn, Bielefeld Stadtbahn, and Hanover Stadtbahn. In local parlance some of those systems are referred to as "U-Bahn", especially when talking about tunnel sections. However, this somewhat misleading terminology is only officially used in Frankfurt am Main which calls its Stadtbahn "Frankfurt U-Bahn". Official documents and specialist publications or railfans and transit advocates maintain the distinction in terms while large parts of the general public and non-specialist press by and large do not.

=== 1980s: Renaissance of the tramway ===
By the 1980s conventional tramways had been seen by decision-makers as overloaded systems for more than two decades. However, public attention focused on them at this time for two reasons.

The Stadtbahn cities' second level plans faced unexpected complications in the form of lengthy construction work, budgetary problems for tunnel projects, and protests against elevated sections. At the same time, the smaller cities which had not started Stadtbahn plans reassessed their options in relation to their existing tram systems. Furthermore, relocating public transit or even pedestrians underground increasingly got a negative reputation and the concept of the automotive city – all but dominating public discourse in the 1950s and 1960s – was increasingly called into question.

East German cities had no 1960s-style Stadtbahn plans in place, and the fleets and the infrastructure were in need of massive investment and improvement. After the reunification of Germany in 1990, the use of the Stadtbahn term became popular in the former East Germany as well, as in Erfurt and Dresden. However, neither the Erfurt tramway nor the Dresden tramway have any significant tunnel or elevated sections or plans to build any. In their case separation from road traffic is achieved by giving the trams their own right of way on the surface.

Stadtbahn in this wider meaning is thus not a clearly defined concept, but a vague one linked to a set of attributes, much in the same way that Straßenbahn ('tram') is linked to very different, sometimes mutually incompatible attributes. A system that is called Stadtbahn today may not have all of the Stadtbahn attributes: barrier-free access, higher cruising speed than tramways, doors on both sides of the train, driver's cabs on both ends, higher operating voltage, wider cars with comfortable seats, and so on.

=== 1990s: The tram goes railway ===
In 1992 Karlsruhe started an innovative new service, using both heavy and light rail infrastructure, to link the wider region to the city. The vehicles were designed to comply with technical specifications for the (federal) heavy railway and for light rail (communal tramways). Such vehicles are called Dual-System Light Rail Vehicles. The meaning of Stadtbahn was enlarged to encompass this new type of "tram-train" service. In other regions, stimulated by the Karlsruhe example and planning to copy it, other terms are in use: Stadt-Umland-Bahn (city-to-region railway, e.g. Erlangen, also in discussion to connect the nearer surroundings of Munich, as far as not supplied with S-Bahn services so far, with the existing public transport there), Regional-Stadtbahn (regional light rail, e.g. Braunschweig). The difference of this system to other systems where light rail mixes with heavy rail, is that in systems like Cologne-Bonn's the tracks were converted for Stadtbahn use by changing the electrification, while in Karlsruhe the trains were equipped to run on both types of track.

Straßenbahn (tram) and Stadtbahn in the Karlsruhe region are differentiated more by the nature of their city-border crossings only, and not by the technical dimension (Dual-System Light Rail Vehicles). Only those services that extend into the suburbs are called Stadtbahn. They are represented by the 'S' logo that is used for S-Bahn (Stadtschnellbahn) in the rest of Germany and therefore partially conflict with it, as it has acquired a second meaning in Karlsruhe.

=== 2000s: The Tram logo ===
The Tram logo

As part of the redevelopment of their main city stations, national railway company Deutsche Bahn adopted a new logo to indicate Straßenbahn (tram) connections: a square containing the word 'Tram'. Although the design is the same nationwide, the colour varies from city to city to match local public transport operators' systems of colour-coding. The logo is part of the 'S logo scheme' initially developed by Berlin public transport operator BVG, based on the established logos for urban metro ('U', for U-Bahn) and suburban metro ('S', for S-Bahn) and including bus ('Bus') and ferry ('F', for Fähre) operations. The logo also helped spread the word "Tram" at the expense of Straßenbahn and elektrische ("electric [railway/tramway]") the latter of which having become somewhat antiquated. The term "Bim" (short for "Bimmelbahn" in turn derived from the semi-onomatopoetic "bimmeln" for the sound of a bell) meanwhile has become limited to Austria, particularly the "Bim" in Vienna.

As the new logos became part of the information systems at more and more main railway stations, an increasing number of cities and public transport operators came to accept and adopt the scheme. As far as the Stadtbahn terminology problem is concerned, however, the scheme serves only to add further confusion to the matter, since there is no nationwide logo for Stadtbahn services. The result appears to be a contraction in the use of the term Stadtbahn, especially in cities where it has been used in its wider 1980s 'light-rail system' meaning.

In cities where Stadtbahn has the 1960s 'pre-metro' meaning, both the 'U' (for U-Bahn) and the 'Tram' logo are used on city maps (to indicate the location of stops) and on railway station signage (to indicate connections). The 'U' Logo is normally used both where stops or stations are underground and where they serve grade separated 'pre-metro' type lines. In cities which prefix all their Stadtbahn line numbers with a 'U' (e.g. Stuttgart), the 'U' logo is used at stops on services that are essentially 'classic' tram lines, not grade separated at all.

== Regionalstadtbahn ==
The concept of Regionalstadtbahnen (also known by RegioStadtbahn or other names) arose as a result of the harmonisation or integration of railway lines into Stadtbahn networks. In the area of Cologne–Bonn a single operational system (of so-called above ground lines or Hochflurstrecken) was created by the Cologne Stadtbahn and the Bonn Stadtbahn, opened in 1974, from the conversion of two former railway lines (the Rheinuferbahn and Vorgebirgsbahn belonging to the old Köln-Bonner Eisenbahnen).

Further developments elsewhere led to tram-train networks that rather resembled an S-Bahn. This idea was first realised in 1992 in Karlsruhe (Karlsruhe Stadtbahn), where as part of the Karlsruhe model even so-called dual system railbuses were used, which in addition to the direct current of Straßenbahn lines (750 V) could also draw power from the 15-kV-alternating current from normal DB catenary. In Karlsruhe this network reached as far as Heilbronn, 84 kilometres (52 mi) away, where a Stadtbahn network was created going out from this line. Both in Karlsruhe and in Heilbronn the Stadtbahn filled both the roles of a classic tramway system as well as an S-Bahn. The Karlsruhe mixed-operation concept was also adopted by the Saarbahn in Saarbrücken. This model is today referred to in France as the tram-train.

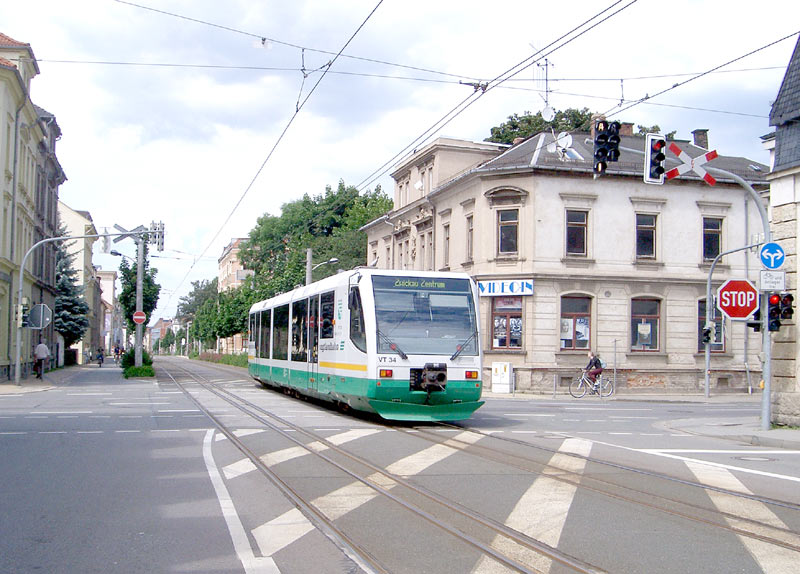
Zwickau diesel tram-train (Vogtlandbahn)

Other Stadtbahn networks in Germany without tunnels, but which incorporate railway lines, are found in:

- Kassel (Kassel RegioTram with hybrid railcars for the transition between electrified and non-electrified routes)
- Zwickau (Diesel railbuses of the Vogtlandbahn on tramways in the city centre)
- Chemnitz (Variotrams trams fitted with railway equipment, which City-Bahn Chemnitz runs daily on the Chemnitz–Stollberg/Erzgeb. line)
- Gotha (Trams in Gotha/Thüringerwaldbahn), above ground tramway (24 km long), in existence since 1924, to Waltershausen, Friedrichroda and Bad Tabarz
- Nordhausen in the South Harz. This tramway network run by the Harz Narrow Gauge Railways is notable because it supplements the diesel-hybrid cars with steam engines.

== Legal terms ==
Although a precise legal definition of Stadtbahn was planned in the 1970s, there is currently no such definition. By law, the BOStrab regulates all Stadtbahn systems as tram systems, as long as they are not mainline rail. All U-Bahn systems in Germany are likewise regulated by BOStrab. In some systems, the Stadtbahn also operates on EBO on parts of the route where track is shared with mainline rail. All four German subway systems are regulated entirely by BOStrab while parts of some tram, light rail or Stadtbahn systems – most notably Karlsruhe Stadtbahn – are regulated under EBO. Meanwhile all S-Bahn systems – including those using third rail electrification like Berlin S-Bahn – are regulated entirely under EBO.

== Difference between Stadtbahn and S-Bahn in Germany ==
While the names Stadtbahn and S-Bahn share a common origin ('rapid urban train'), their meaning today is different.

- S-Bahn is commuter rail, usually integrated into the railway network and mostly operated by the German national railway company Deutsche Bahn.
- Stadtbahn, on the other hand, generally use light rail vehicles (either high-floor or low-floor), and are usually integrated into the tram network, though the Stadtbahn portions do not operate with street running as much as trams do.

They also differ in legal status: S-Bahn systems are governed under the rail rules of the Eisenbahn-Bau- und Betriebsordnung (EBO) ('Ordinance on the Construction and Operation of Railways'), while Stadtbahn systems are usually tramways by law governed under the regulations of Verordnung über den Bau und Betrieb der Straßenbahnen (BOStrab) ('Ordinance on the Construction and Operation of Trams').

== See also ==
- Train categories in Europe
