= Braunsel =

River in Germany

- The Braunsel at Rechtenstein

Location
- Country: Germany
- State: Baden-Württemberg

Physical characteristics
- Mouth
  - location: Danube
  - coordinates: 48.2398°N 9.5383°E

Basin features
- Progression: Danube→ Black Sea

The Braunsel is a short river in Baden-Württemberg, Germany. It is 0.9 km (0.6 mi) long and flows into the Danube near Rechtenstein.

== See also ==
- List of rivers of Baden-Württemberg
