= Verordnung über den Bau und Betrieb der Straßenbahnen =

German law on tramway construction and operation

The Verordnung über den Bau und Betrieb der Straßenbahnen ("Ordinance on the Construction and Operation of Street Railways" / light railway regulations), abbreviated as BOStrab, is a German law regulation governing the field of tramway, metro and light rail operations.

The orders are enacted by the Federal Ministry of Transport based on enabling act through the General Railway Law ("Allgemeinen Eisenbahngesetz", first issued on 29. March 1951). The supervisory authority is delegated to the Federal Railway Authority of Germany.

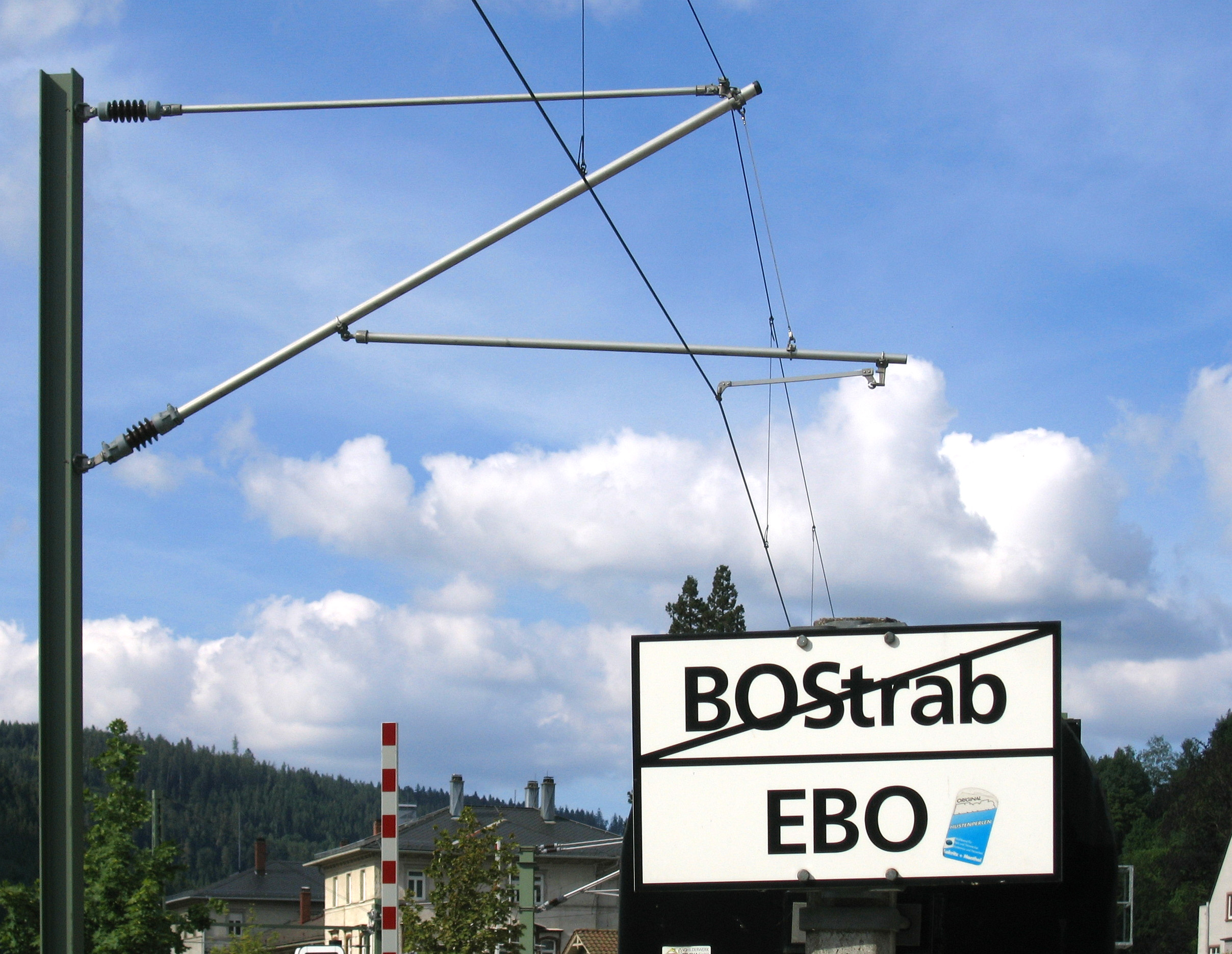
EBO-BOStrab switch on the Karlsruhe tram-train system

The BOStrab regulations are not as strict as the EBO main railway regulations; for example the BOStrab does not specify a strict loading gauge to follow. A third law ESBO (Eisenbahn-Bau- und Betriebsordnung für Schmalspurbahnen) covers narrow-gauge railway regulations. The distinctions for these light rail systems are slightly different from in the UK Tramways Act 1870 (33 & 34 Vict. c. 78) / Light Railways Act 1896.

Some Stadtbahn systems are subject to both BOStrab and EBO regulations as their vehicles use both types of networks. This is common with tram-train systems - apart from a technical switch on the boundary (e.g. EMUs need to change from 750 V to 15 kV) a different set of safety regulations needs to be followed (e.g. tramways are run on sight while main railways use block control).

== Trackbed ==
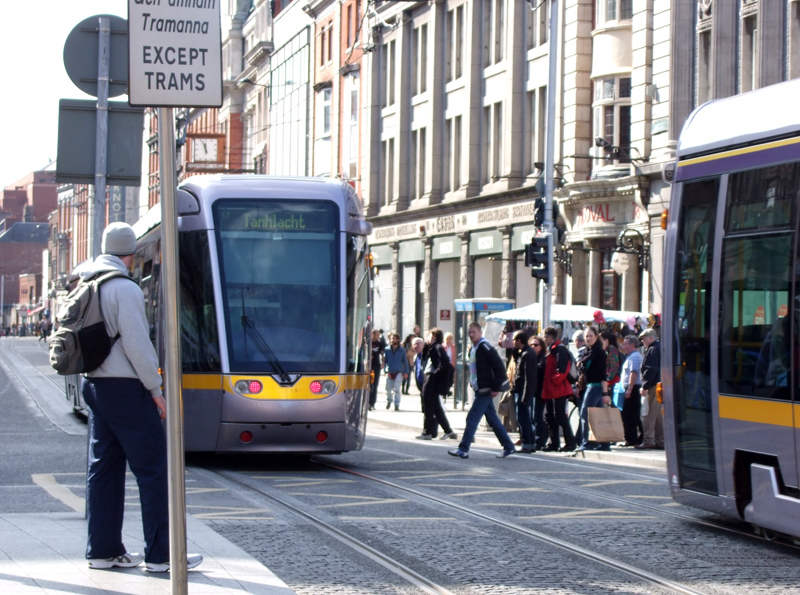
Exclusive trackbed of the Dublin Light Rail System in the city centre.

The § 16 BOStrab defines the legal types of trackbed:

Street running trackbed ("Straßenbündiger Bahnkörper"):

These tramways are running directly along public streets, without any separation which makes them subject to rules of the road as automobiles. As such the streetcars need to be equipped with mirrors and blinkers.

Exclusive Trackbed ("Besondere Bahnkörper"):

The tramway is part of the urban traffic structure but its railroads are separated from other traffic by an embankment, trees or curbs giving them an exclusive right of way. There may be railroad crossings marked with signs or traffic lights that regulate the access.

Independent Trackbed ("Unabhängiger Bahnkörper"):

The railway is independent of the urban traffic structure which in most cases has the railroad trackbed grade-separated in the city. The law allows level crossing as they are common outside of the city centre.

If the tramway is street running or the crossings of the exclusive trackbed do not fit in the scope of § 20 BOStrab then tramways are limited to a maximum length of 75 m (246 ft) and a maximum width of 2.65 m (8 ft 8 in).

Current eligibility criteria define that federal funding for railroads is only permitted for sections that have a trackbed that is at least exclusive.

== See also ==
- street running definitions overview
