= GT4 (Bremen) =

German tramcar type

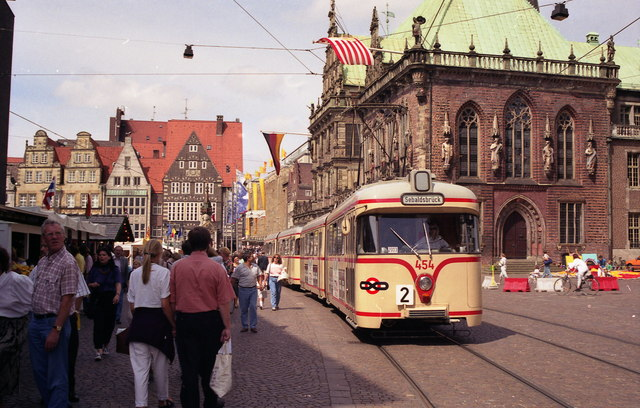
GT4 train from Bremer Wagonbau in original colours in front of the city hall of Bremen

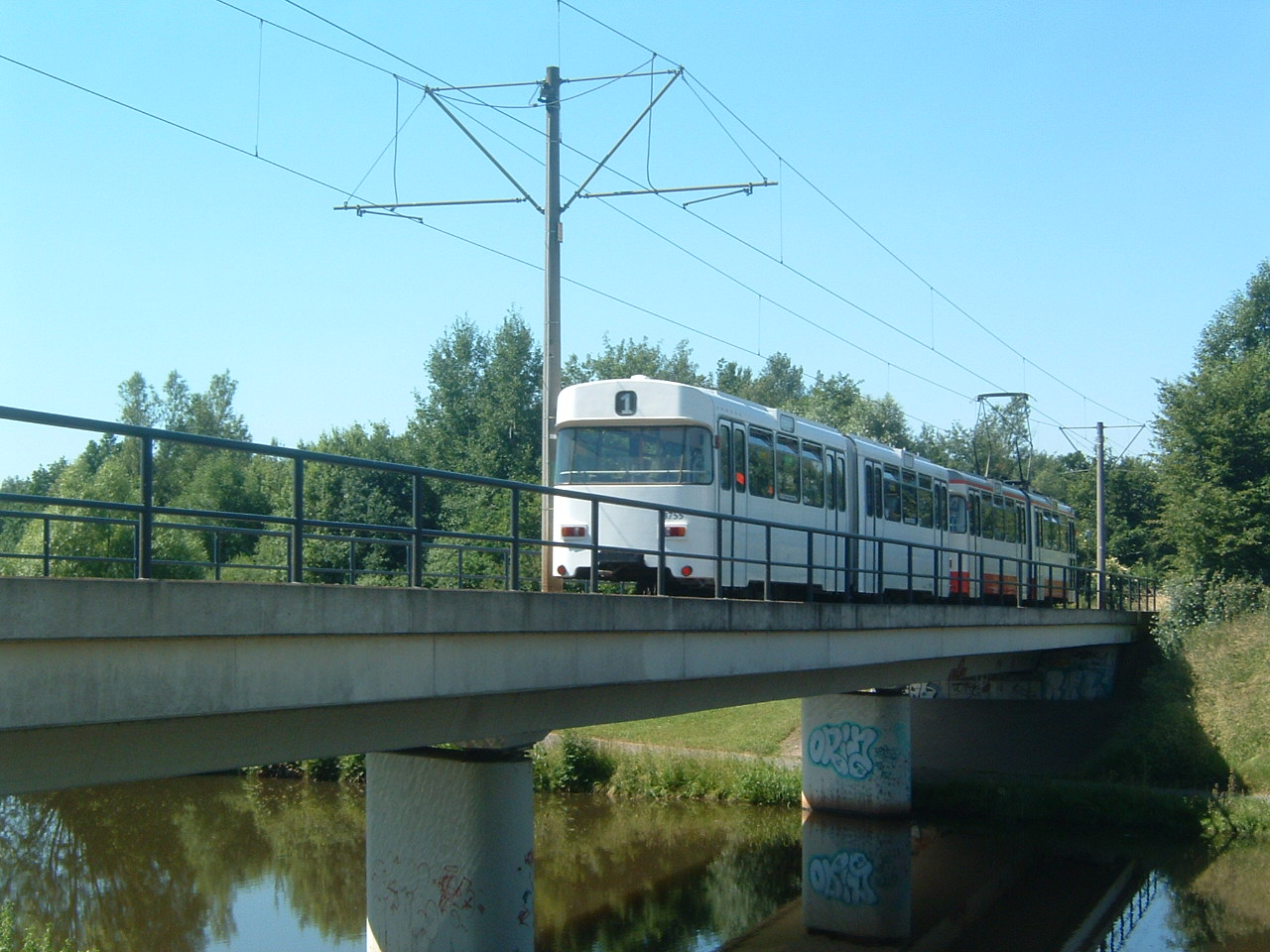
GT4/GB4-train from Wegmann & Co.

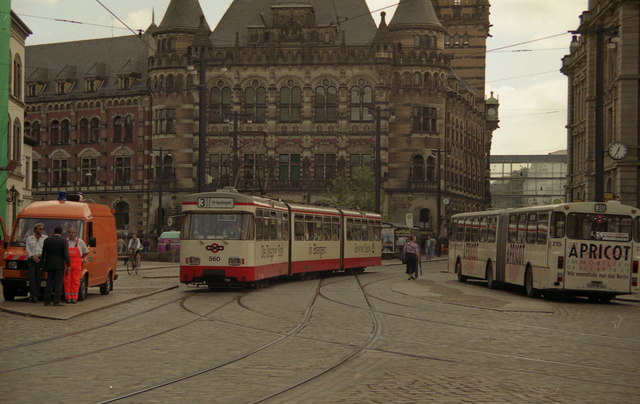
GT6 car derived from a Wegmann GT4

The Bremish GT4 is a GT4 type tramcar that was built in two main versions from 1959 to the 1980s. These articulated trams have a direct articulation. Similar class P trams were produced under licence for the Munich tramways.

== History ==
In the 1950s and 1960s, the Bremish tram company Bremer Straßenbahn, like many other West German tram companies, changed old two-axle tramcars for modern ones on bogies. The cars could be longer, if they were articulated. In Bremen, like at the same time in Stuttgart, articulated cars on only two bogies were constructed by the local manufacturer Hansa Waggonbau. The articulation was controlled by transmission shafts. All the Bremish cars were designed for unidirectional traffic (doors only on the right side), so that they required loops on the ends of their courses.

With few changes (types GT4 to GT4c), this tramcar was produced till 1968. For Bremen and Bremerhaven, 79 such trams were built. In daily service they ran partly single, partly in trains of two such cars. Later, part of the motorcars were transformed to trailers. In Bremen, these trams were in service till 1990. Afterwards, several of them were sold to Timișoara in Romania, where they are still in use.

After the decay of Hansa Wagonbau, since 1973 the Wegmann & Co. railcar company in Kassel continued the production of trams for Bremen. The principal structure of Bremish GT4 was kept, but the articulation was now controlled hydraulically. These types were called GT4d to GT4f, in all 61 items. The Bremish Wegmann articulated tram was also produced as a trailer (types GB4d to GB4f, in all 47 items). In that period, most trams in Bremen ran as trains of an articulated motorcar and an articulated trailer.

In 1986, two of these Wegmann cars were enlarged by interposition of a third segment, also with two doors and three windows on the right side. These cars were called GT6, but they were very different from Duewag GT6.

The experiences acquired with these cars were used by AEG manufacturing company, when they developed low-floor trams for Bremen, which they also sold to several other systems, such as the Berlin tramway and the Munich tramway.

== See also ==
- GT4MT Armonia (de) - Romanian rebuilt Bremish GT4
- GT4 (tram)

== Literature ==
- Bremer Straßenbahn AG (Hrsg.): Bremen und seine Straßenbahn. Eine illustrierte Zeitreise. Bremen 2001, ISBN 3-927155-47-0
- Bremer Straßenbahn AG 1876–1976. Jubiläumsbuch zum 100-jährigen Bestehen.
- Freunde der Bremer Straßenbahn: Die Schienenfahrzeuge der Bremer Straßenbahn
- Dieter Höltge: Straßen- und Stadtbahnen in Deutschland. Band 2: Niedersachsen / Bremen. EK-Verlag, Freiburg 1992, ISBN 3-88255-331-6
