= German Centre for Rail Traffic Research =

German research institute

- Deutsches Zentrum für Schienenverkehrsforschung
- Abbreviation: DZSF
- Formation: 23 March 2019
- Type: Government agency
- Headquarters: Dresden and Bonn
- Region served: Germany
- Members: Eisenbahn-Bundesamt
- Official language: German
- Owner: Federal Government of Germany
- Leader: Corinna Salander
- Staff: 60
- Website: https://www.dzsf.bund.de/

The German Centre for Rail Traffic Research (German: Deutsches Zentrum für Schienenverkehrsforschung (DZSF)) is an independent, technical-scientific departmental research institution of the Federal Government. It was founded on 23 May 2019, and is located as an independent federal institute at the Eisenbahn-Bundesamt. Its mission is to strengthen rail transport in Germany through application and solution-oriented research.

The budget for 2019 was 5 million euros and was expected to increase to 20 million euros in 2020. 2020 staff should be built up first and the research content (along the federal research program) should be specified later.

== Tasks ==
The coalition agreement for the 19th Election Period foresees a German Centre for Rail Transport Research (DZSF). This center should document research findings, manage and coordinate research projects, and also carry out research itself. This is intended to achieve a more effective use of resources and a lasting strengthening of railway traffic as a mode of transport.

The DZSF deals with the central issues of the railway sector as defined in the Federal Rail Research Program and provides solutions for them. Research fields are

- Economic efficiency
- Environment and sustainable Mobility, and
- Safety.

The cross-cutting topics of digitalization, automation, migration, and legal issues are assigned to these three topic areas. These cross-cutting topics complement the integrative approach of the federal research program.
