= Rathgeber =

Rathgeber is a surname of German origin. Notable people with the surname include:

- Alex Rathgeber (born 1982), Australian actor, and singer
- Brent Rathgeber (born 1964), Canadian lawyer, author, and politician
- Thomas Rathgeber (born 1985), German soccer player
- Valentin Rathgeber (1682–1750), German composer, organist, and choirmaster
