= Corinna Salander =

German physicist and engineer

- Born: 1967 (age 58–59)
- Education: University of Kiel; Clausthal University of Technology
- Occupations: physicist, engineer

Corinna Salander (1967) is a German physicist and engineer who has been serving as director of the German Centre for Rail Traffic Research (DZSF) since 2020.

== Career ==
She studied physics from 1987 to 1993 at University of Kiel. She received a PhD in electrical engineering from Clausthal University of Technology in 1999. Her dissertation was on algorithms for the calculation of electromagnetic fields in rail vehicles. From 1999 to 2014, she held multiple executive positions at Deutsche Bahn, European Union Agency for Railways and Bombardier. She held a chair in rail vehicle technology (German: Schienenfahrzeugtechnik) at the University of Stuttgart from 2014 to 2019. She was the first female European professor in railway transport technology. The chair was supported by Knorr Bremse und Voith Turbo GmbH.

She gave multiple interviews about DZSF and railway transport technology to regular magazines and newspapers, for instance, Eurailpress in October 2020, to Die Zeit in Juni 2021 and to System||Bahn, a German railway magazine, in December 2021.

== Life ==
She is married and a mother of three children.

In 2018, she participated as one of the four expert in the Tübinger Achtbar. According to Prof. Corinna Salander, the fact that the majority of German women currently do not take up scientific and technical professions is at least partly due to their own comfort. Together with Saskia Schulz, Prof. Markus Hecht und Annette Hering, she participated in MINTeinander-Konferenz about the gender diversity issue. In Mai 2022, she participated in a F.A.Z.-podcast Women and men do not fit together with her husband Volker Looman.

== Awards (selection) ==
On 29 October 2021, she became an awardee of the Golden environmental rail (German: Goldene Umweltschiene).

== Works (selection) ==
- Corinna Salander: "Das Europäische Bahnsystem: Akteure, Prozesse, Regelwerk", 2019, Springer Vieweg, ISBN 9783658234959
