= Rechtenstein =

- Municipality
- Coat of arms

- Location of Rechtenstein within Alb-Donau-Kreis district
- Interactive map of Rechtenstein
- Location within Germany Location within Baden-Württemberg
- Coordinates: 48°14′27″N 9°32′44″E
- Country: Germany
- State: Baden-Württemberg
- Admin. region: Tübingen
- District: Alb-Donau-Kreis

Government
  - Mayor (2015–23): Romy Wurm

Area
  - Total: 3.77 km^{2} (1.46 sq mi)
- Elevation: 538 m (1,765 ft)

Population (2025-12-31)
  - Total: 287
  - Density: 76.1/km^{2} (197/sq mi)
- Time zone: UTC+01:00 (CET)
  - Summer (DST): UTC+02:00 (CEST)
- Postal codes: 89611
- Dialling codes: 07375
- Vehicle registration: UL
- Website: www.rechtenstein.de

Rechtenstein is a municipality in the district of Alb-Donau in Baden-Württemberg in Germany. The community belongs to the administrative community Munderkingen.

== Geography ==
=== Geographical location ===
Rechtenstein is situated on the Danube between Riedlingen and Munderkingen. The Braunsel flows here into the Danube.

=== Neighboring communities ===
The municipality is bordering to the east to Lauterach, in the south to Obermarchtal and to the east and north to Emeringen.

== History ==
The castle Steinburg is the seat of the family from Stain. It was first mentioned in documents in 1331, as Berthold inhabited the castle from Stain. On August 12, 1410 Wolf von Stain sold part of the place which had formed in the meantime around the castle, to Württemberg. Bernhard Stain acquires 1557 all shares castle and village back, so that the whole place is family owned again. In 1806 the place finally fell to Württemberg. In 1817 the castle was demolished except for the castle tower.

== Religions ==
Rechtenstein remained even after the Reformation Roman Catholic. The Baroque parish church of St. Georg was ordained 1744.

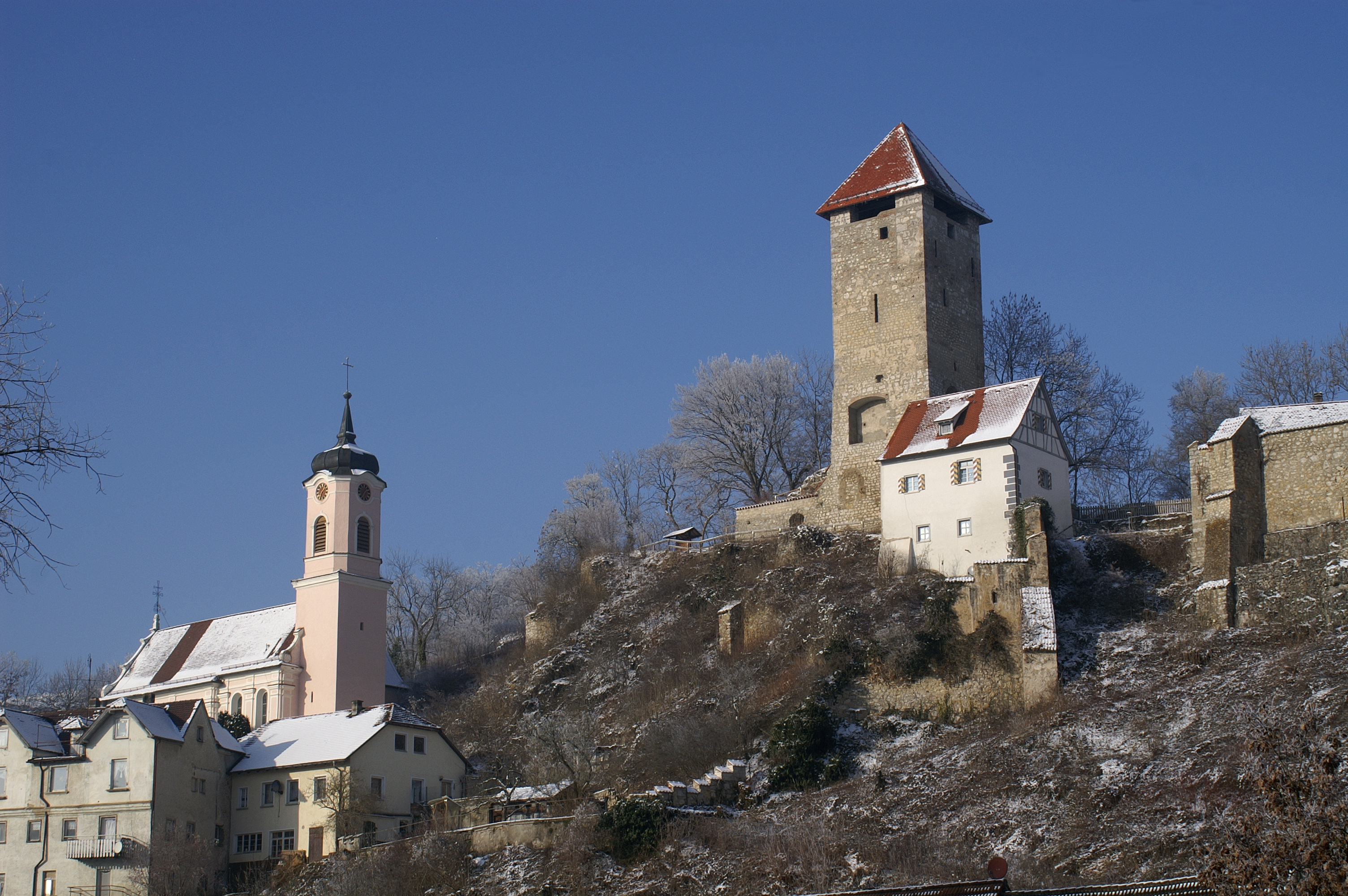
Rechtenstein castle and church St. Georg

== Crest ==
The coat of arms was approved on August 3, 1957 by the Ministry of Interior. Blazon : "Argent, a continuous red cross, is superimposed with a gold heart shield, in three ousted Black Wolf fishing."

== Buildings ==
- Hydroelectric power plant on the Danube with turbine and factory building from 1905

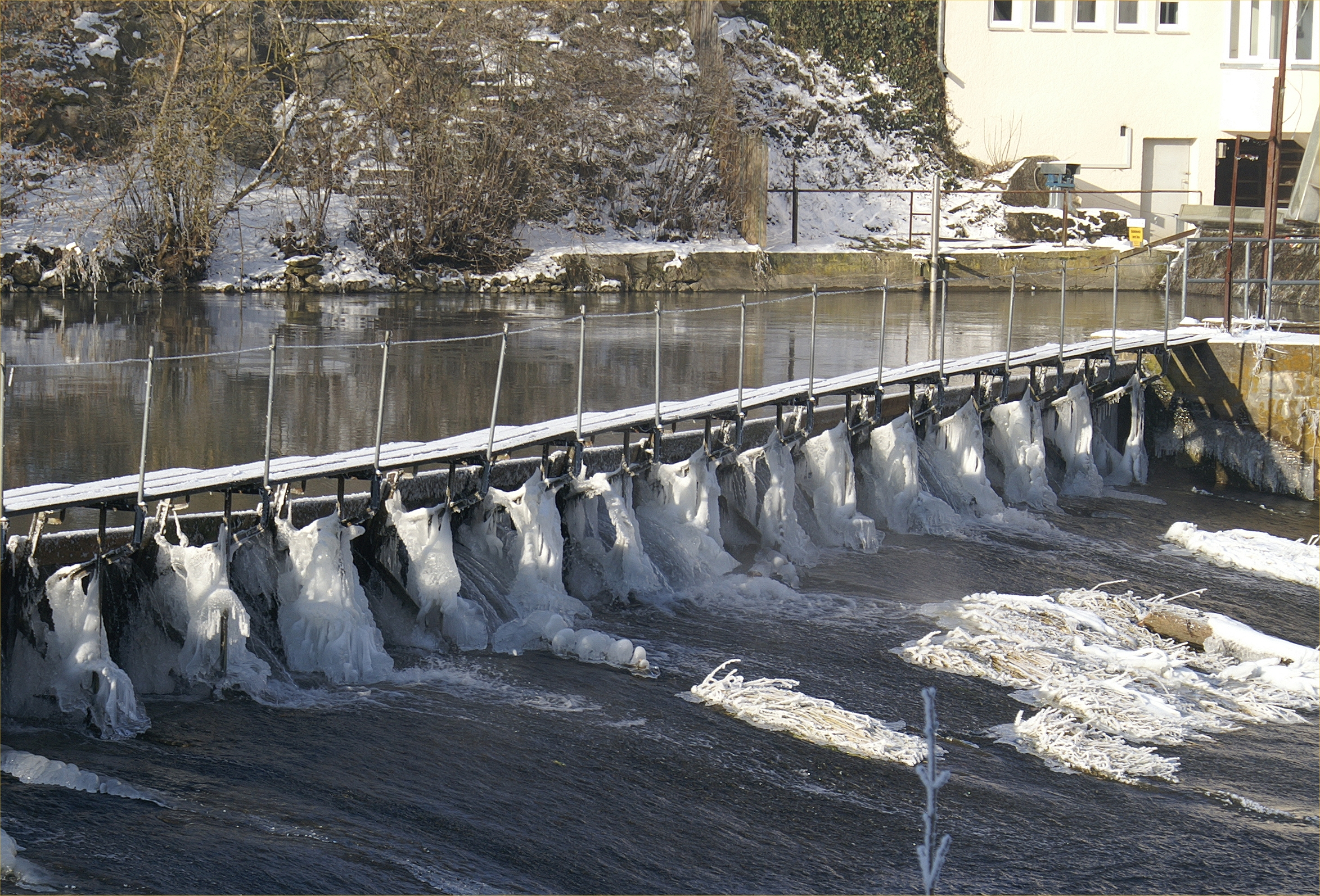
Rechtenstein power plant

== Transportation ==
Rechtenstein lies on the Ulm–Sigmaringen railway. For many years no train stopped at Rechtenstein station, but currently 8 trains a day stop at the station throughout the year. Buses run to Munderkingen and Riedlingen. In addition, the Danube bike path from Donaueschingen to Vienna runs through Rechtenstein.

== Literature ==
Description of the Oberamt Ehingen 1826, Reprint 1971 by Horst Bissinger publisher, Magstadt, ISBN 3-7644-0003-X , digitized in Wikisource.
