= Parkeisenbahn =

Parkeisenbahn may refer to one of several park railways in Germany:

- Dresdner Parkeisenbahn
- Leipziger Parkeisenbahn (also known as the Parkeisenbahn Auensee)
- Parkeisenbahn Chemnitz
