= Eisenbahn-Bau- und Betriebsordnung =

The Eisenbahn-Bau- und Betriebsordnung ("Ordinance on the Construction and Operation of Railways" / railway regulations), abbreviated as EBO, is a German law regulation specifying rules and regulations for railways.

The orders are enacted by the Federal Ministry of Transport based on enabling act through the General Railway Law ("Allgemeinen Eisenbahngesetz", first issued on 29. March 1951). The supervisory authority is delegated to the Federal Railway Authority of Germany.

Unlike trams and light rail operating under the BOStrab tramway regulations but like metros also operating under the BOStrab regulations, railways operating under the EBO will rely on signals during their normal operation. A third law ESBO (Eisenbahn-Bau- und Betriebsordnung für Schmalspurbahnen) covers narrow-gauge railway regulations.

The signalling systems to be utilized by railways under the EBO regulations are detailed in the Railway Signalling Regulations ("Eisenbahn-Signalordnung" / ESO).
