= Federal Railway Authority =

Railway regulator in Germany

Federal Railway Authority Eisenbahn-Bundesamt
- logo of German Federal Network Authority
- Abbreviation: EBA
- Formation: 1994-01-01
- Type: Government agency
- Legal status: Established by Act on the Federal Administration of Railway Traffic
- Purpose: licensing and supervision authority for federal railways.
- Headquarters: Bonn
- Region served: Germany
- Official language: German
- President: Gerald Hörster
- Website: http://www.eba.bund.de/

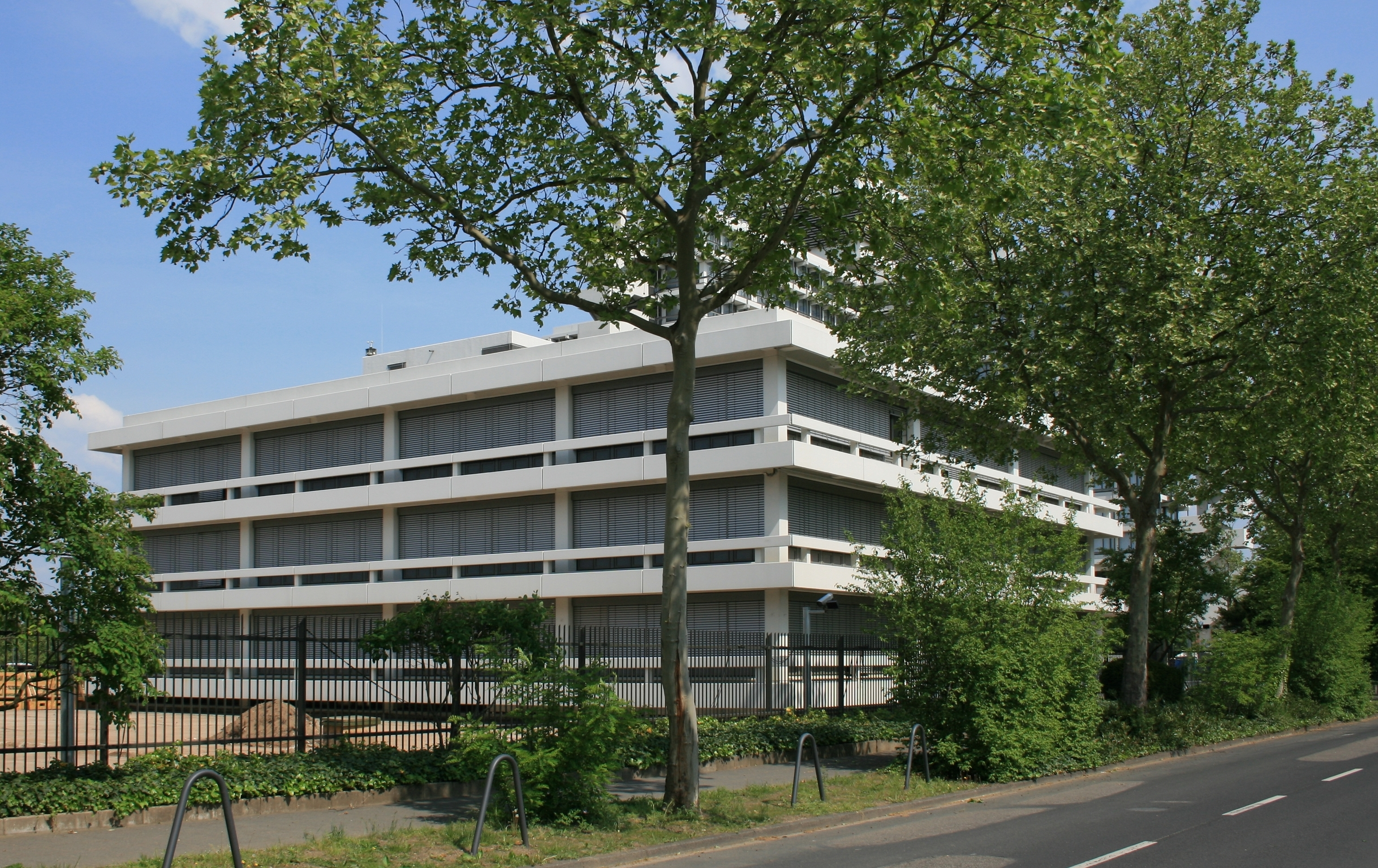
Headquarters of the Federal Railway Office in Bonn

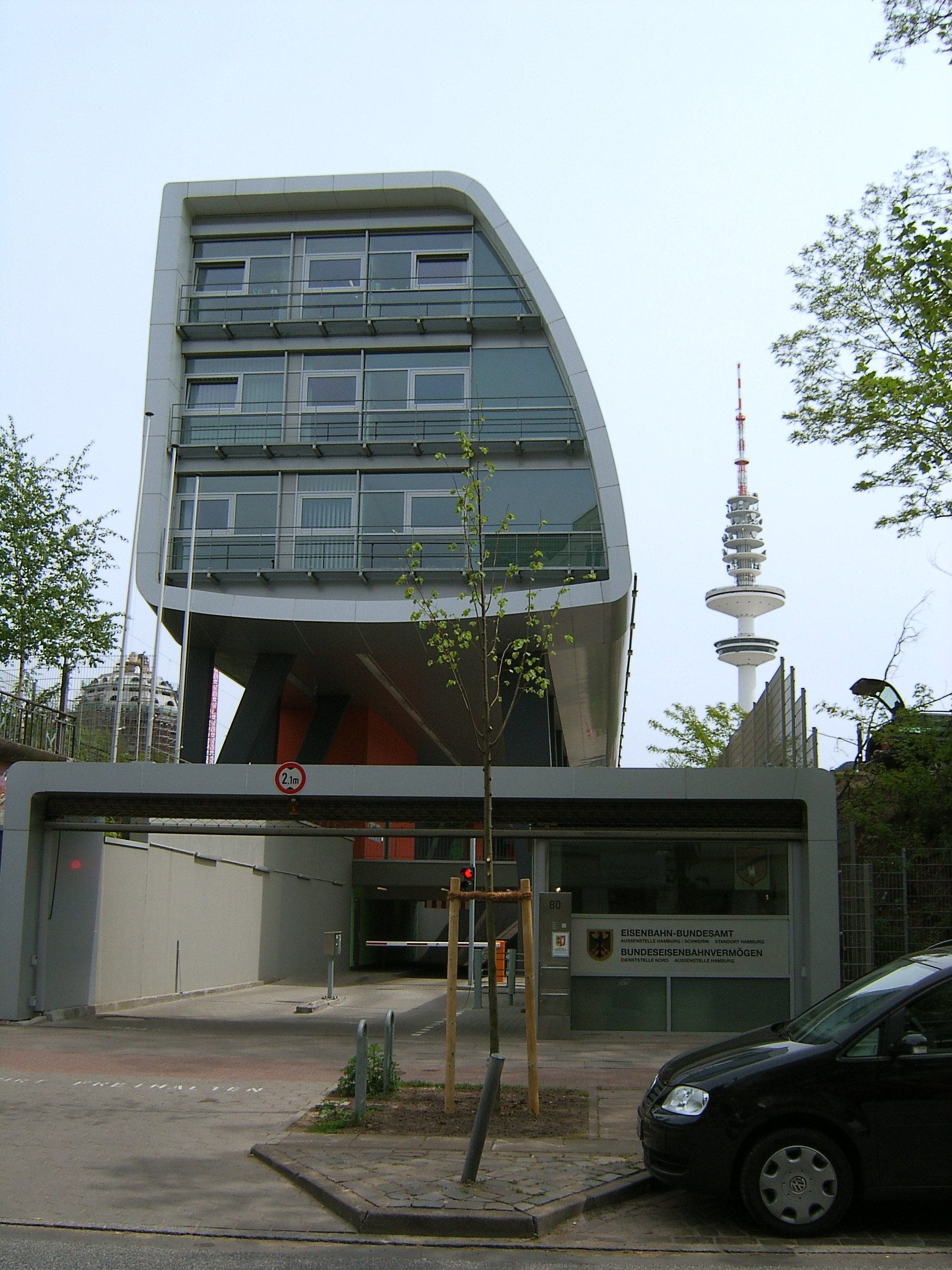
Hamburg branch

The German Federal Railway Authority (German: Eisenbahn-Bundesamt, EBA) has been the independent federal authority for the regulation of the railways in Germany since 1 January 1994. It is under the supervision and direction of the Federal Ministry for Transport and is headed by a president.

== Responsibilities ==
The EBA is the inspectorate and authorising body for the majority of German domestic, railway infrastructure companies that are owned by the government, referred to as federal railways (Eisenbahnen des Bundes or EdB), and for German and foreign railway transport operators in Germany.

Non federally owned public railways and privately operated railways are under the supervision of the German states (Bundesländer), who can choose to transfer this responsibility to the EBA (§ 5 Abs. 2 AEG). To date 11 states, with the exception of Berlin, Bremen, Hamburg, Hesse and Lower Saxony have chosen to do so. In such cases the EBA works under the direction of the states.

Since 1 January 2007 the EBA has run the railway vehicle register for Germany in accordance with § 5 Abs. 1e of the General Railway Law (Allgemeines Eisenbahngesetz or AEG) and the EU guidelines in §25a of the AEG and is therefore responsible for the issue of vehicle index and classification numbers.

The EBA has a flat organisational structure. Over 300 employees work at its headquarters in Bonn on the core issues, and another 1,000 people carry out the operational work of inspections and authorisations, occasionally on the spot, in twelve branches at 15 locations. Also within the purview of the Federal Railway Office is the responsibility for investigating railway accidents.

In addition, the EBA has also taken on the responsibility for the approval and oversight of maglev railways under the General Maglev Law (Allgemeines Magnetschwebebahngesetz or AMbG).

Since 1 January 2006 the Federal Network Agency (Bundesnetzagentur) has been responsible for overseeing access to the railway infrastructure. Detailed regulations contain rules about the non-discriminatory access to railway infrastructure and the principles for granting rewards for the use of railway infrastructure under the Railway Infrastructure User Regulation (Eisenbahninfrastruktur-Benutzungsverordnung or EIBV).

== History ==
With effect from 1 January 1994, as part of the structural reformation of the German railways, the former so-called "special assets" of the Federal Republic of Germany - the Deutsche Bundesbahn and the Deutsche Reichsbahn - were reorganised into an operational division, the Deutsche Bahn AG (DB AG), and two national authorities, the Federal Railway Office (Eisenbahn-Bundesamt) and Federal Railway Assets (Bundeseisenbahnvermögen or BEV), both subordinated to the Federal Ministry for Transport, Construction and Housing. A merger of these two authorities, originally planned for 2009, has currently foundered.

The first president of the EBA was Horst Stuchly. His successor, Armin Keppel, retired in 2008. Keppel also led the Bundeseisenbahnvermögen in 2007.

In 2009, a new president, Gerald Hörster, took up office.

In 2019, German Centre for Rail Traffic Research was founded at the Federal Railway Agency.

== Approval guidelines ==
Approvals for old technology:

- Munich Bundesbahn Headquarters (Bundesbahnzentralamt München): Mü8004, Munich 1980 (on April 4)

New technology:

- DIN/ISO=EN 50126, 50128, 50129

== See also ==
- Eisenbahn-Bau- und Betriebsordnung
