= Heidelberg University shooting =

2022 mass shooting in Heidelberg, Germany

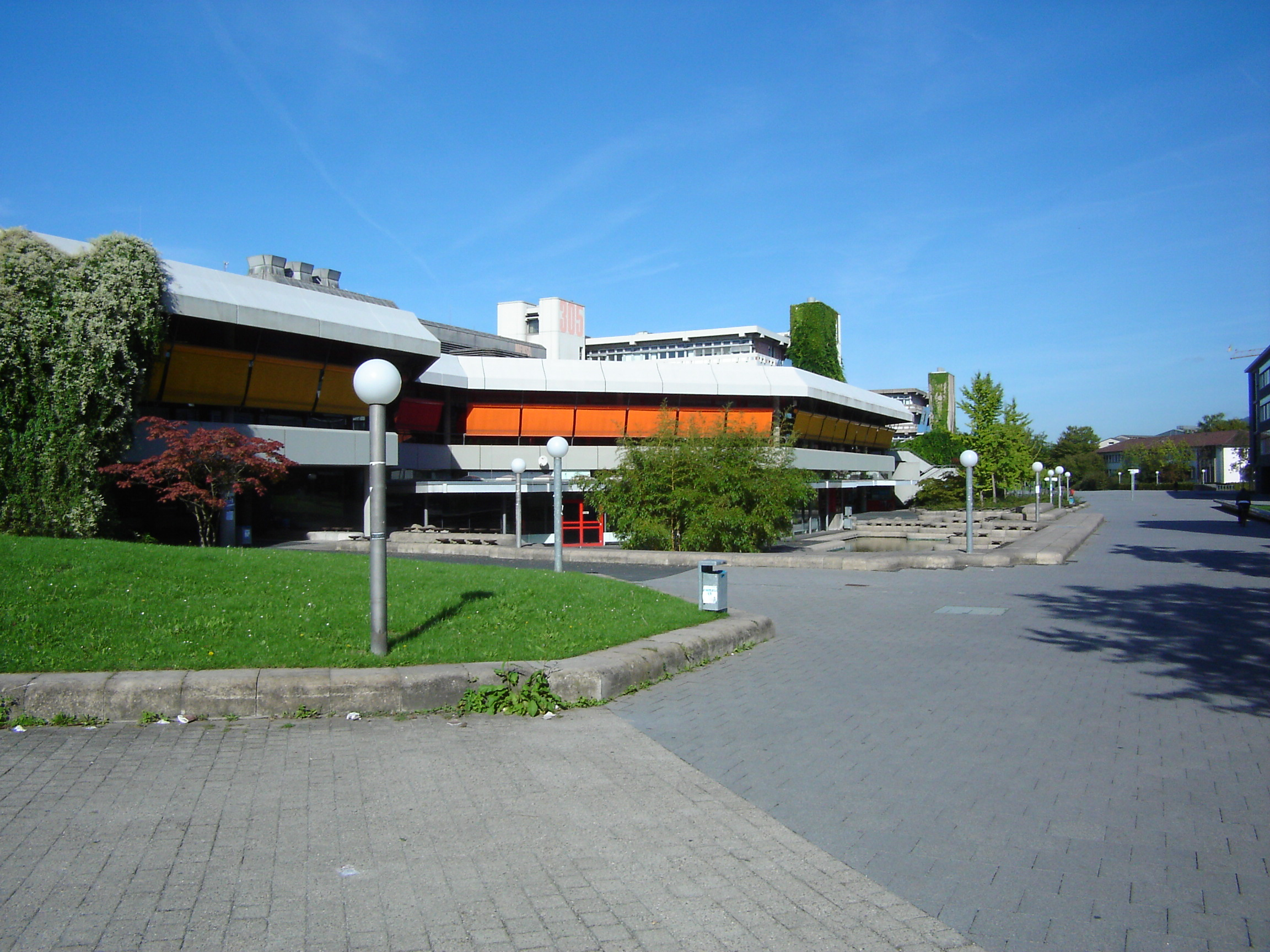
- Mensa at Campus of Heidelberg University in Neuenheimer Feld
- Location: 49°25′00″N 8°40′12″E; Heidelberg University, Neuenheimer Feld, Heidelberg, Baden-Württemberg, Germany
- Date: 24 January 2022 c. 12:24
- Attack type: Mass shooting, school shooting, murder-suicide
- Weapons: 12-gauge Akkar Churchill 512 double-barreled shotgun; Marlin Firearms Model 1894 lever action rifle (Unused)
- Deaths: 2 (including the perpetrator)
- Injuries: 3
- Perpetrator: Nikolai G.
- Motive: Unknown (suspected "revenge for humiliation")

On 24 January 2022, a mass shooting occurred in a lecture hall at Heidelberg University in Baden-Württemberg, Germany. One person was killed and three others were injured before the perpetrator, 18-year-old student Nikolai G., fled the building, killing himself on university grounds.

The police arrived at the scene shortly after the attack, and launched an investigation. The gunman's motives were unclear. Several public figures and organizations expressed their condolences and offered support to the affected students and their families.

== Background ==
Germany has some of the strictest gun laws in Europe, and school shootings there are rare. Anyone under 25 is required to pass a psychological evaluation before getting a gun licence. The last school shooting in Germany that resulted in fatalities before the attack was the Winnenden school shooting in March 2009.

The university had initially opted to educate students virtually, due to the COVID-19 pandemic in Germany, but it resumed in-person learning in October 2021. The tutorial was split into small groups of about 30 students.

== Shooting ==
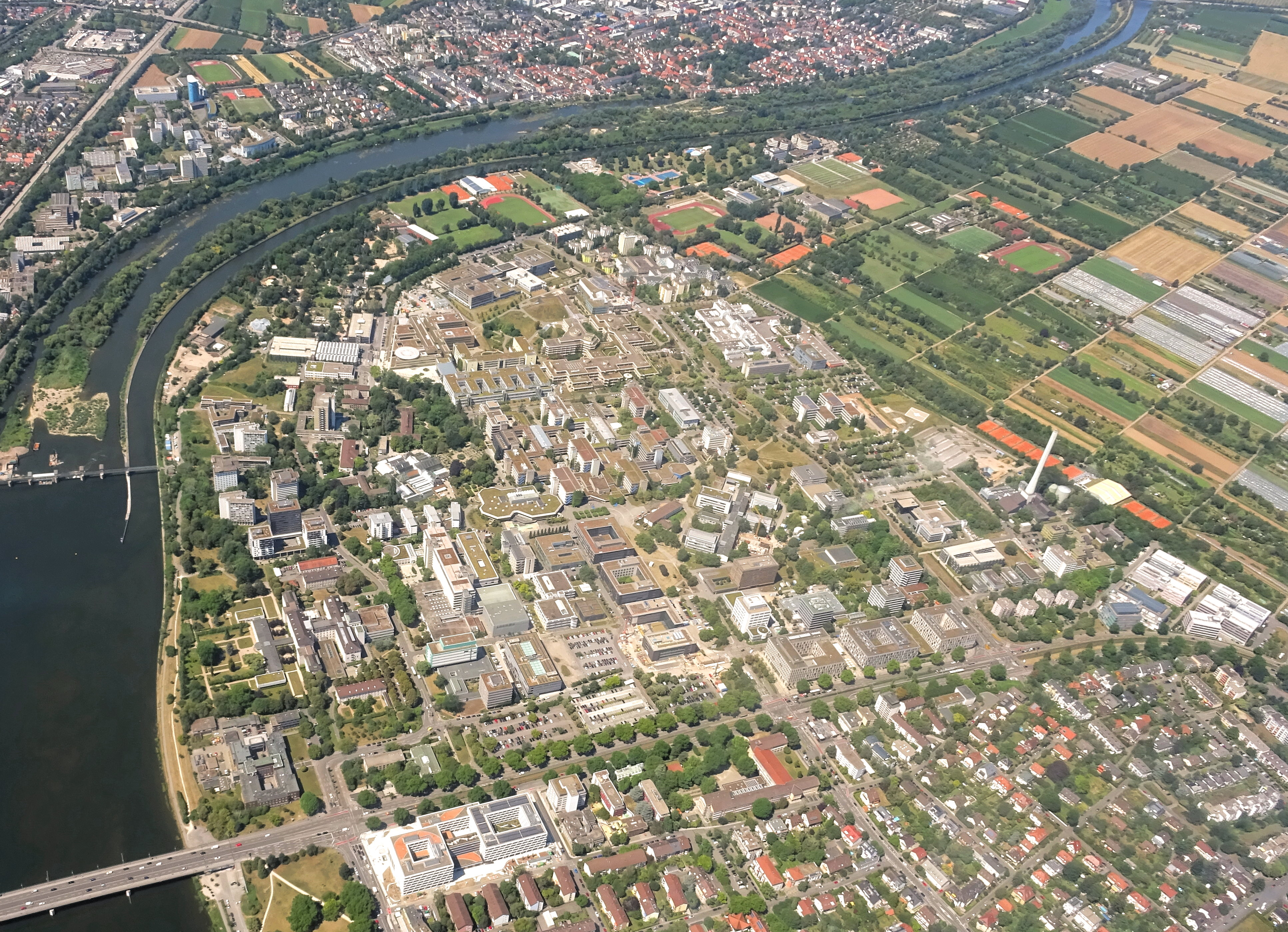
Aerial view of Campus "Neuenheimer Feld"

The incident happened on Neuenheimer Feld, in the campus housing the medical faculty and natural science faculties of Heidelberg University. The campus at Neuenheimer Feld, north of the Neckar, is mainly home to the natural science faculties and properties of the university hospital.

The 18-year-old gunman reportedly sent a text message on WhatsApp to his father directly before the shooting, claiming "people have to be punished now" and demanding a burial at sea. He entered a lecture hall located in INF 360 building at the campus, carrying a double-barreled shotgun (Akkar Churchill 512, 12 gauge) and a lever action rifle (Marlin Model 1894), and opened fire with the shotgun on the crowd of 30 freshman students, who were participating in an ongoing organic chemistry class. Authorities reported the shooter fired shots across the amphitheatre "wildly".

He carried a backpack that contained 150 rounds of ammunition. The shooter fled the scene and was later found dead in the area of the Botanical Garden nearby; his death was ruled by investigators to be a suicide.

Police in Heidelberg said they had received seven calls within 43 seconds at 12:24 p.m., reporting the incident. At 12:30 p.m., three patrol crews were at the university. The police quickly ruled out other perpetrators.

== Victims ==
The shooter injured four people, including a 23-year old woman who was shot in the head and died shortly afterwards at hospital. The other victims suffered minor injuries in the face, back, and legs. Two of the survivors were German women (the oldest being 21, the other 19 years old) while the third was a German man with Italian citizenship.

On 25 January it was announced that three injured people were healthy and discharged from the hospital. The funeral of the killed woman is planned to be held on the upcoming Monday in Heidelberg's St. Peter's Church.

== Investigation ==
Police have launched an operation investigating the shooting, warning students not to go near the area where the shooting happened. Sniffer dogs patrolled the university grounds as the policemen carried out the operation. Over 400 police officers were involved in the investigation. Officers were spotted examining two firearms and a beige bag found in the nearby Heidelberg University Botanical Garden close to the scene. This was later confirmed by local authorities. On 25 January it was announced that a team composed of 32 investigators named "Botanik" were investigating the origin of the weapons and the suspect's motive under the directions of Heidelberg's public prosecutor's office.

The firearms used in the shooting were said to have been obtained from Vienna, Austria. Police found a receipt of the acquisition and are investigating which individual sold the weapons to the shooter. The perpetrator had no possession permit for weapons under German law. The used type of weapons can be bought by adults without restrictions in Austria.

The investigators were reportedly looking for evidence in the gunman's electronic devices to evaluate the possible motives of the attacker. Shortly after the attack the chief of Heidelberg's public prosecutor's office said it was too early to speculate on a possible motive for the gunman's actions.

== Perpetrator ==
According to Mannheim police president Siegfried Kollmar, the gunman was Nikolai G., an 18-year-old student at Heidelberg University and resident of Mannheim, originating from the Wilmersdorf borough of Berlin. According to police reports the gunman was a German citizen with no previous criminal record, but was involved in a fight in 2017. Tagesspiegel reported that Nikolai G. and a friend beat a younger boy when he was 14 years old. The victim's mother contacted the police, but the legal proceedings were later dropped. He was enrolled as a biology student and was considered healthy, but according to Süddeutsche Zeitung, there are indications of a past mental illness. The attacked lecture was part of his university curriculum, but he was part of a different lecture group.

According to the investigators his name was listed in an old internal document of the neo-Nazi party The III. Path. On 26 January a speaker of Heidelberg's public prosecutor's office stated that although there are "clues" about Nikolai G.'s involvement with The III. Path, there were no evidence yet that the attack could have been politically motivated.

According to investigative results made public in March 2022, Nikolai G. was a "loner" who did not have any social relationships with fellow students. He also did not previously have any contact with the students present in the lecture hall, including the injured and killed ones. The investigators noted that an altercation with the students was therefore not Nikolai G.'s motive. In their view, the gunman wanted to take revenge for "perceived humiliation". This conclusion is based on the fact that he had been receiving psychiatric treatment since the age of 15. In the years before the shooting, he was diagnosed with narcissistic personality disorder and twice hospitalized for suicide attempts and suicidal thoughts. According to his doctors, Nikolai G. had an extremely low self-esteem, was unable to accept criticism and easily offended.

Furthermore, a forensic psychiatrist ordered to investigate the case by the local District Attorney told reporters that the gunman's narcissistic personality disorder was an "essential reason" for the shooting. He said that a key symptom of this disorder is a form of self-hatred, which in turn develops into hatred for "random" other people. The investigators therefore suspect that Nikolai G. felt "extremely humiliated" and "fundamentally misunderstood" for no particular reason during his first term at Heidelberg University, which could have been a motive for the shooting. Nevertheless, they also announced that Nikolai G.'s motive could not be "undoubtedly determined".

== Reactions ==
The shooting was condemned by German chancellor Olaf Scholz, who described the news as "tear[ing his] heart apart." The minister-president of Baden-Württemberg Winfried Kretschmann and Thomas Strobl, the Minister of Interior of Baden-Württemberg shared their condolences with the victims and their families and thanked the police force for their work. Baden-Württemberg's Minister of Science Theresia Bauer visited the shooting site and met with the university rector Bernhard Eitel. State Minister of Education, Science and Culture of Schleswig-Holstein Karin Prien described the incident as "shattering".

Heidelberg student union president Peter Abelmann said the students are "infinitely shocked. This is a disaster beyond anything you can imagine between lectures, exams and campus life". The school offered psychological support services for the students.

A week after the shooting, a memorial service was held in honour of the victim at the university church (Peterskirche). The service was broadcast by SWR and shown in various buildings across the campus. At 12:24, exactly one week after the shooting there was a minute's silence across the entire city, with people gathering in the University Square and in front of the central Mensa, where candles and flowers had been placed.

== Misinformation ==
The incident was used by people in a targeted manner to exploit the crime for their own ends. Anonymous users have slandered a YouTuber as the alleged perpetrator of the shooting, whom they alleged wanted to avenge the suffering of animals. The incident was given by tagesschau.de as an example of fake news after the shooting.

== See also ==
- List of mass shootings in Germany
- List of school shootings in Europe
