= John Neoptolemos =

British surgeon

John P Neoptolemos
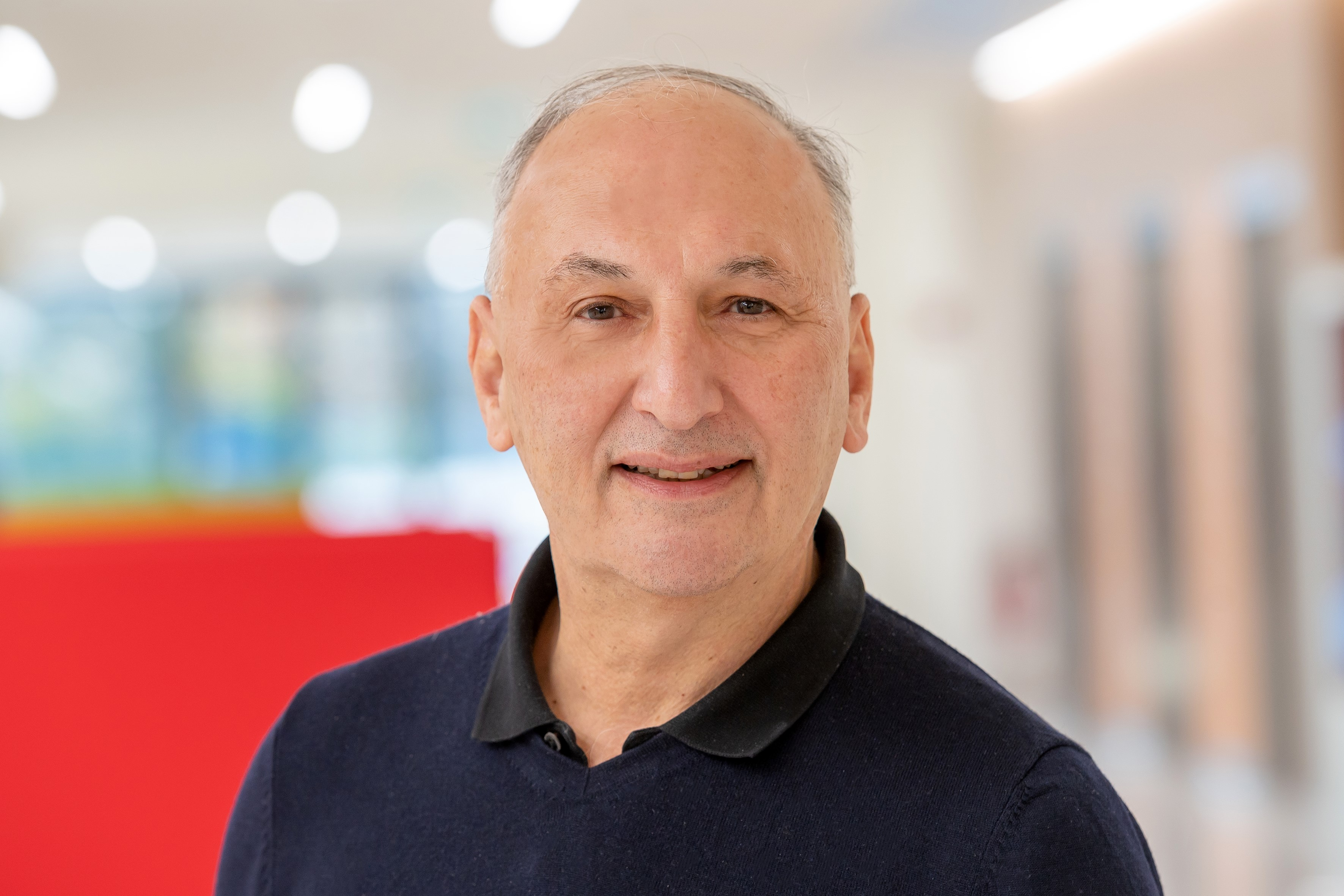
- John P. Neoptolemos in 2021
- Born: Pano Zodeia, Cyprus
- Education: Churchill College, Cambridge, University of London, UCSD, University of Paris, University of Ulm
- Known for: European Study Group for Pancreatic Cancer Research (ESPAC)
- Medical career
- Profession: Surgeon
- Institutions: University of Birmingham (Dudley Road Hospital), (Queen Elizabeth Hospital), Liverpool University, University of Heidelberg (University Hospital Heidelberg)
- Sub-specialties: General surgery, Oncology
- Research: Pancreatic disease, Pancreatic cancer, Pancreatitis

John P. Neoptolemos is a British surgeon and academic specializing in pancreatic surgery and pancreatic cancer research. He is Professor of Surgery at Heidelberg University Hospital in Germany. He previously served as Professor of Surgery and Head of Surgery at the University of Liverpool, where he held the Owen and Ellen Evans Chair of Surgery. His research has focused on pancreatic cancer, surgical oncology, clinical trials, pancreatic disease, and mechanisms of resistance to cancer treatment.

Neoptolemos has been associated with the European Study Group for Pancreatic Cancer and has chaired the group's clinical research program. He was also involved in the establishment of the International Study Group for Pancreatic Surgery. His work has included leadership of major randomized clinical trials investigating treatments for pancreatic cancer, including the ESPAC series of trials.

== Early life and education ==
John P. Neoptolemos was born on 30 June 1951. He attended Owen's Grammar School for Boys in Islington, London, where he was involved in school sports and served as a prefect.

In 1970, he entered Churchill College, Cambridge, to study Natural Sciences and Philosophy. He graduated in 1973 with a Bachelor of Arts degree with 2.1 honours. He subsequently undertook medical training at Guy's Hospital in London and received the MB BChir degree from the University of Cambridge in 1976, followed by an MA in 1977.

Neoptolemos completed his surgical training in the United Kingdom and was elected a Fellow of the Royal College of Surgeons of England in 1981. In 1985, he received an MD from the University of Leicester for research into the effects of surgery on monocyte function in patients with colorectal cancer.

== Academic and clinical career ==
Neoptolemos began his academic and clinical career at the University of Birmingham, where he was appointed Senior Lecturer in Surgery in 1987 and Reader in Surgery in 1990. He became Professor of Surgery in 1994 and also worked as a consultant surgeon at Queen Elizabeth Hospital Birmingham. In 1996, he moved to the University of Liverpool as Professor of Surgery and later became Head of Surgery and holder of the Owen and Ellen Evans Chair of Surgery.

During his 21 years at Liverpool, Neoptolemos held several senior academic, clinical and research leadership positions. He served as Director of the Liverpool Clinical Trials Unit and the Cancer Research UK Liverpool Cancer Trials Unit and was Head of the School of Cancer Studies from 2005 to 2010. From 2007 to 2012, he was Deputy Director of the Cancer Research UK and National Institute for Health Research Liverpool Experimental Cancer Medicine Centre, and from 2007 to 2017 he served as Scientific Director of the National Institute for Health Research Pancreas Biomedical Research Unit. He was also Director of the Liverpool Cancer Research UK Centre and contributed to the development of clinical-trial and cancer-research infrastructure in Liverpool.

Neoptolemos moved to Germany in 2017, when he was appointed Professor of Surgery in the Department of General, Visceral and Transplantation Surgery at Heidelberg University Hospital. His work has continued to combine clinical surgery with research into pancreatic cancer, clinical trials and translational cancer medicine.

Neoptolemos has held leadership positions in international organizations concerned with pancreatic disease, surgery and cancer research. He has served as Chair of the European Study Group for Pancreatic Cancer and was involved in the establishment of the International Study Group for Pancreatic Surgery. He has also served on clinical and research advisory bodies and independent trial steering committees relating to pancreatic cancer and gastrointestinal disease.

== Research ==
Neoptolemos's research has focused primarily on pancreatic cancer and pancreatic surgery, with an emphasis on improving outcomes through clinical trials, evidence-based treatment, and translational research. His work has examined the role of surgery and systemic therapy in pancreatic cancer, the use of adjuvant chemotherapy following pancreatic resection, biological factors influencing treatment response, and mechanisms underlying resistance to cancer therapy. His research has also extended to chronic pancreatitis and inherited pancreatic diseases.

=== Pancreatic cancer and clinical trials ===
A major part of Neoptolemos's research career has been devoted to the development and conduct of randomized clinical trials in pancreatic cancer. Through the European Study Group for Pancreatic Cancer, he contributed to a series of multicentre studies collectively known as the ESPAC trials. These studies investigated the effectiveness of different treatment strategies for patients with pancreatic cancer and helped establish evidence for the use of chemotherapy following surgical resection.

The ESPAC-1 trial examined the roles of postoperative chemotherapy and chemoradiotherapy in pancreatic cancer. Its findings contributed to a change in the approach to postoperative treatment and supported the use of adjuvant chemotherapy after surgery. Subsequent studies, including ESPAC-3, compared different chemotherapy regimens in patients who had undergone pancreatic cancer surgery.

The ESPAC-4 trial investigated combination chemotherapy with gemcitabine and capecitabine against gemcitabine alone following surgical resection. The study reported improved survival with the combination regimen and contributed to the adoption of combination chemotherapy as an adjuvant treatment option for patients with resected pancreatic ductal adenocarcinoma.

Neoptolemos was also involved in ESPAC-5, which investigated treatment strategies for patients with borderline resectable pancreatic cancer. The trial evaluated whether early systemic treatment could improve outcomes before surgery and contributed to the growing use of multimodality treatment for patients whose tumors may initially be difficult to remove surgically.

His subsequent research has included the ESPAC-6 and ESPAC-7 programs, which have focused on refining treatment strategies through molecular and biological characterization of pancreatic cancer. These studies reflect a broader shift in his research toward selecting treatments according to the biological characteristics of individual tumors.

=== Translational and molecular research ===
Neoptolemos has combined clinical trial research with laboratory and translational studies designed to investigate why pancreatic cancers respond differently to treatment. His research has examined molecular characteristics of pancreatic tumors and their relationship to clinical outcomes.

A particular area of interest has been the use of genomic and transcriptomic information to identify biological pathways associated with treatment response and resistance. Research associated with the ESPAC program has investigated tumor gene-expression patterns and other molecular features with the aim of identifying patients who may benefit from particular forms of chemotherapy.

This work has sought to move pancreatic cancer treatment away from a uniform approach toward treatment strategies informed by the molecular characteristics of individual tumors. His more recent research has therefore focused on transcriptomic signatures, mechanisms of clinical drug resistance and the identification of potential therapeutic targets.

=== Pancreatic surgery and adjuvant treatment ===
Neoptolemos's surgical research has examined the relationship between pancreatic resection, postoperative treatment and long-term survival. His work has contributed to the clinical evidence surrounding the treatment of patients with resectable pancreatic cancer and the role of systemic therapy after surgery.

His research has particularly emphasized the importance of randomized evidence in determining the effectiveness of treatments used alongside surgery. The ESPAC studies provided a framework for comparing treatment strategies across large groups of patients and helped establish evidence-based approaches to postoperative management.

=== Chronic pancreatitis and pancreatic diseases ===
In addition to pancreatic cancer, Neoptolemos has contributed to research on chronic pancreatitis and other pancreatic disorders. He participated in international collaborations involving the development of consensus recommendations for the diagnosis and management of chronic pancreatitis.

His work in this area has involved international cooperation among pancreatic research organizations, including the International Association of Pancreatology, the European Pancreatic Club, the Japan Pancreas Society and the American Pancreatic Association.

He has also contributed to research concerning inherited pancreatic diseases, reflected in his receipt of the Henry Lynch Award for Inherited Pancreas Diseases in 2018.

=== Research infrastructure and clinical research ===
At the University of Liverpool, Neoptolemos played a role in developing research infrastructure linking surgery, cancer biology and clinical trials. He served as Scientific Director of the National Institute for Health Research Pancreas Biomedical Research Unit and held leadership positions within the Liverpool Cancer Research UK Centre and the Cancer Research UK and National Institute for Health Research Liverpool Experimental Cancer Medicine Centre.

He was also involved in the Liverpool Clinical Trials Unit and Cancer Research UK Liverpool Cancer Trials Unit, where clinical trials were conducted across cancer specialties. These positions allowed his research program to integrate laboratory investigation with prospective clinical studies.

The research programs with which he has been associated have received competitive funding from organizations including Cancer Research UK, the National Institute for Health Research and charitable and international research foundations. The curriculum vitae supplied for Neoptolemos reports more than £68 million in competitive research funding across his Liverpool and Heidelberg appointments.

== Scientific merits ==
In 1991 Neoptolemos was the founder of the European Study for Pancreas Cancer Research (ESPAC) that has led the way for internationally collaborative pancreas cancer trials (ESPAC 1-4 trials). The ESPAC-1 trial was the first trial to establish the benefit of adjuvant treatment in pancreatic cancer favoring chemotherapy rather than chemoradiotherapy. In 1997 he established the European Registry of Hereditary Pancreatitis and Pancreatic Cancer (EUROPAC) for the study of genetic pancreatic diseases. In 2005 Neoptolemos co-founded the International Study Group for Pancreas Surgery (ISGPS) with Markus Büchler (Ulm) and others.

== Media commentary ==
Neoptolemos has been quoted in the press as an expert on pancreatic disease. In 2011 he commented in The Guardian on the medical leave of Apple chief executive Steve Jobs, and in 2013, in reporting on the inquests into the deaths of two former University of Manchester staff who had worked in the university's Rutherford Building, he was cited as stating that radiation does not cause pancreatic cancer.

== Awards and honors ==
Neoptolemos received the Hirschberg Award for Pancreatic Cancer from the American Pancreatic Association in 2005. He was elected a Fellow of the Academy of Medical Sciences in 2007 and was appointed a Cancer Research UK Senior Investigator in 2009 and a National Institute for Health Research Senior Investigator in 2011. In the same year, he received the Freedom of the City of Liverpool for his contribution to cancer research and clinical medicine.

In 2012, Neoptolemos was made an Honorary Member of the German Society of Surgery, followed in 2013 by a Lifetime Achievement Award from the European Pancreatic Club. In 2014, he was made an Honorary Member of the Hungarian Society of Surgery and an Honorary Professor of Nanjing Medical University. He became an Honorary Fellow of the International Association of Surgery, Gastroenterology and Oncology in 2016.

Neoptolemos received the Ruth Brufsky Award for Pancreas Cancer Research in 2017 and the Henry Lynch Award for Inherited Pancreas Diseases in 2018. He was elected a member of the Academia Europaea in 2019. He subsequently received Honorary Lifetime Membership of the European Pancreatic Club in 2023 and of the International Association of Pancreatology and Deutscher Pankreasclub in 2024.

== Books (selection) ==
- Neoptolemos JP (Ed). Cancer of the Pancreas. Clinical Gastroenterology, London, Baillière Tindall, Vol 4, No 4 1990
- Lemoine N, Cooke T, Neoptolemos JP (Eds). Cancer: A Molecular Approach. Oxford, Blackwell Scientific, 1993 (pp 383)
- Neoptolemos JP, Lemoine N (Eds). Pancreatic Cancer: Molecular & Clinical Advances. Oxford, Blackwell Scientific 1996
- Beger HG, Warshaw A, Carr-Locke DL, Russell RCG, Buchler M, Neoptolemos JP, Saar M. (Eds). The Pancreas (Two Volumes). Boston, Blackwell Scientific 1998 (pp 1644)
- Neoptolemos JP (Ed.). Acute Pancreatitis. Clinical Gastroenterology, London, Bailière Tindall 1999; Vol. 13, No. 2 (pp 152)
- Gress TM, Neoptolemos JP, Lemoine NR, Real FX (Eds). Exocrine pancreas cancer. The European Pancreatic Cancer-Research Cooperative (PC-RC). Felsenstein CCCP, Hannover. 2005 (pp 531)
- Neoptolemos JP and Bhutani MS. Fast Facts. Pancreas and Biliary Tree. Health Press Abingdon. 2006 (pp127)
- Neoptolemos JP and Ghaneh P (Eds). Cancer of the Pancreas. Best Practice & Research in Clinical Gastroenterology. London, Baillière Tindall
- Beger HG, Warshaw A, Büchler M, Kozarek R, Lerch M, Neoptolemos JP, Shiratori K, Whitcomb D. (Eds). The Pancreas, Second Edition. Blackwell Publishing, Massachusetts, US, 2008 (pp 1006)
- Neoptolemos JP, Urrutia R, Abbruzzese JL, Büchler MW (Eds). Pancreatic Cancer. Springer, New York, 2010. Two Volumes (pp1335)
- HG Beger HG, Nakao A, Neoptolemos JP, Peng SY, Sarr MG (Eds). Pancreatic Cancer, Cystic Neoplasms and Endocrine Tumors: Diagnosis and Management. Wiley Blackwell Publishers. 2018 (pp 436)
- Beger HG, Warshaw A, Hruban R, Büchler M, Lerch M, Neoptolemos JP, Tooru Shimosegawa, Whitcomb D. (Eds). The Pancreas, Third Edition. Blackwell Publishing, Massachusetts, US, 2018 (pp 1173)
- Neoptolemos JP, Urrutia R, Abbruzzese JL, Büchler MW (Eds). Pancreatic Cancer. Springer, New York. Second Edition. 2018. Three Volumes (pp 1642)
- Beger HG, Warshaw A, Hruban R, Büchler M, Lerch M, Neoptolemos JP, Tooru Shimosegawa, Whitcomb D. (Eds). The Pancreas, Third Edition. The Pancreas: An Integrated Textbook of Basic Science. Chinese Edition. John Wiley & Sons Limited Chichester, West Sussex, United Kingdom. ISBN 978-1-119-18839-1. 2019
