= Mushroom kiosk =

Small Business Kiosk

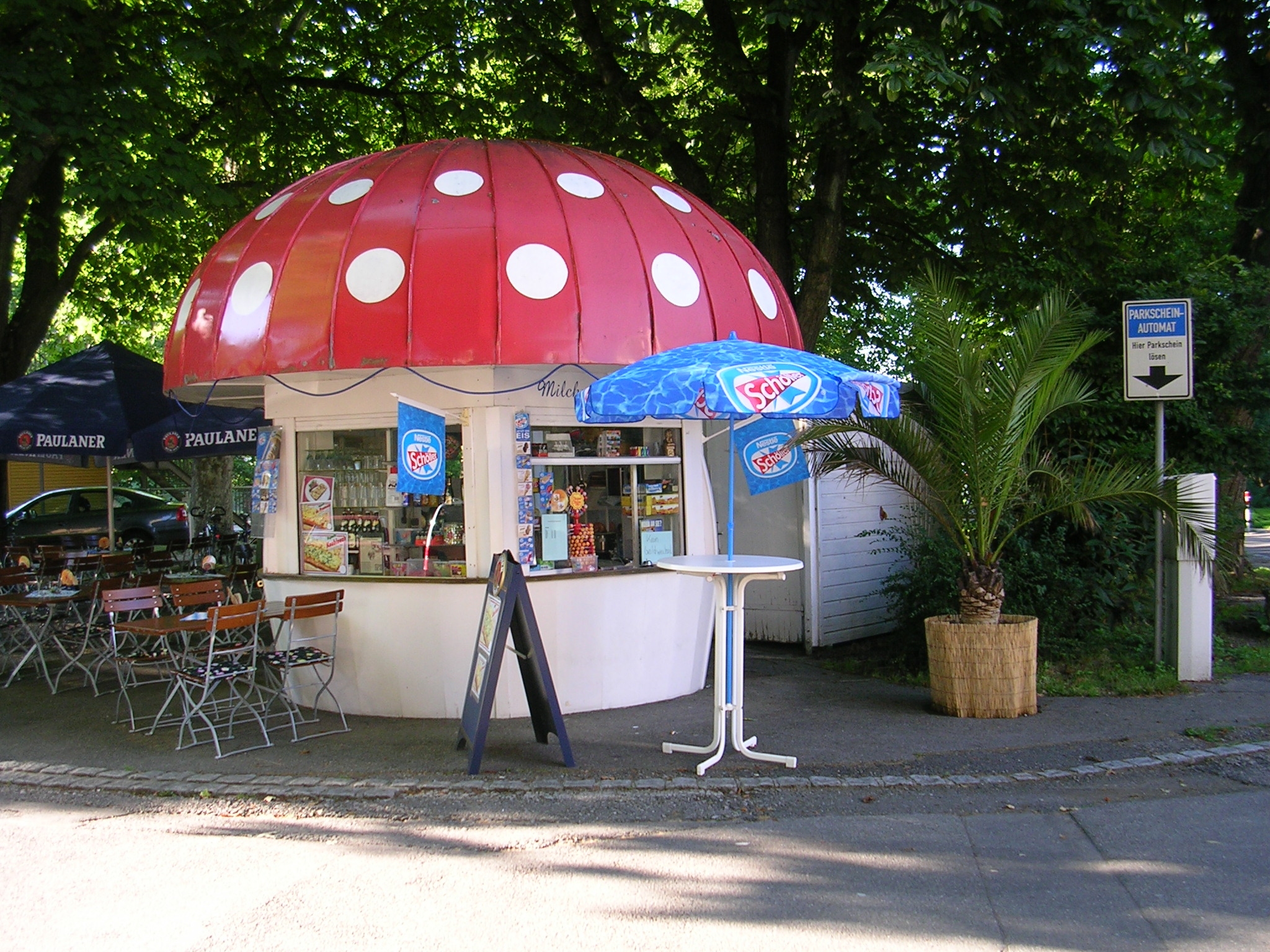
Milk mushroom in Lindau (Bodensee) (built in 1952)

A mushroom kiosk (German: Pilzkiosk) is a kiosk in the shape of a fly agaric. Mushroom kiosks were common in West Germany and Austria in the 1950s. They were originally designed to sell milk and dairy products, under the name Milchpilz (lit. 'milk mushroom').

== Background ==
The Wirtschaftswunder of the 1950s was reflected in the regained prosperity. Since alcohol wasn't available until the age of 21, it was considered fashionable to meet in milk bars and ice cream parlors. At the same time in Germany, dairies and their products were in competition with new soft drinks, which could be bought easily and conveniently at every kiosk. Milk, however, lacked such outlets.

This supply gap was to be closed with the idea of a milk kiosk, which would sell a wide range of milk products. The first kiosk in the shape of a fly agaric mushroom was presented as a so-called "milk consumer advertiser" at the "metropolitan dairy industry" conference in May 1952 in Bayreuth, and was later brought to Regensburg. Later, the manufacturer, Hermann Waldner KG from Wangen im Allgäu, had both the design and the name "mushroom kiosk" protected by law. Because a milk kiosk should have a high recognition value, Hermann Waldner's son Anton, who was the managing director of the time, chose the striking shape of a fly agaric mushroom.

The building itself was a prefabricated wooden structure painted white. In its original form, the kiosks had a flexible, water-repellent roof made of polyvinyl chloride (trade name: mipolam, now known as PVC). The roof was the characteristic red colour with white spots. In the course of the fading and structural aging of the soft PVC there was considerable shrinkage, so that some were soon re-roofed with a large metal structure and then painted in a similar style.

Milk mushrooms had a total height of around 4 metres and a roof width of 4.6 metres. The diameter of the interior space measured 3.15 metres. It was equipped with four sliding windows, a glass door, three built-in tables, and four shelves. A built-in refrigerator, whipped cream dispenser, and an ice cream machine could be purchased as additional standard equipment.

However, there was resistance from the authorities: in a letter dated 12 August 1952, the Württemberg State Office for Nature Conservation and Landscape Management in Ludwigsburg wrote to the management of Waldner: "I think the design of your little milk houses in the shape of a mushroom is completely absurd. The rejection of this structure, which would be more appropriate for America, by the city building authorities would be fine. I don't believe it takes a mushroom to make milk drinks popular. Reliable service and low prices will do more than tasteless advertising."

The mushrooms were not only sold in Germany, but also exported throughout Europe to Austria, Switzerland, Italy, France, Belgium and Greece.

The last item in the Waldner KG order book is number 49: delivery took place on 21 November 1958 to Mannheim.

== Locations ==
To this day, there are still eight kiosks in operation:

Picture	Location	Description
	Bregenz, Bregenz (district), Vorarlberg, Austria → Seestraße/main entrance to the lake (47°30′17.72″N 9°44′46.44″E)	On 20 July 1953, the milk mushroom was brought to the shore of Lake Constance, where it remains standing in front of the Kunsthaus Bregenz (KUB) until this day. In the 1990s it was in the way of traffic planners. After public protests, the demolition plans were rejected and it was later moved a few metres to its current location right next to the level crossing. Since 2007 it has been protected under cultural heritage management. The milk mushroom is owned by Vorarlberg Milch eGen. Today it is the only kiosk that still serves its original purpose, selling milk and dairy products. The product range has been expanded to include baked goods. In 2015 the state capital Begrenz agreed to a contract with Voralberg Milch. This option agreement grants the city a thirty-year right to purchase the property for 20,000 euros to ensure that the milk mushroom will continue to be available to the citizens of Bregenz in the future.
	Lindau (Lake Constance), Lindau (district), Bavaria, Germany → Sina-Kinkelin-Platz 1 (47°32′52.94″N 9°40′56.43″E)	The Lindau milk mushroom is the first mass-produced mushroom. It was delivered on 13 May 1952. Its location is on the north side of the island of Lindau underneath the Thierschbrücke (Thiersch bridge). It still stands today under cultural heritage management (D-7-76-116-533) and is still in operation, currently as a kiosk with a licensed bar, snack menu, and beer garden.
	Mardorf, Neustadt am Rübenberge, Hanover Region, Lower Saxony, Germany → Warteweg/Uferweg crossroads, Steinhuder Meer (52°29′11.05″N 9°18′21.11″E)	The mushroom kiosk is situated at the north shore of the Steinhuder Meer at the "Mardorfer Warte" jetty of the Steinhuder Personenschifffahrt & Berufssegler GmbH (Steinhuder passenger shipping & professional sailors GmbH). The so-called "fly agaric" at the southern end of the Warteweg was set up in front of the Dükerstuben in 1952 and later developed into a fish sandwich station with an extension. The building was renovated and reopened in 2004 but had to be completely renovated in the winter of 2012/2013. The reason for the renovation was the replacement of the Uferweg (lake shore path). The mushroom had to then be moved temporarily. It was discovered that lots of wooden planks had rotted at their ends and the tarpaulin cover was weathered. Only the frame structure was still intact. A wooden building with a storage room and public toilet was built next to the mushroom. It was reopened in July 2013 and serves as a snack bar and ice cream stand. It is owned by the community. Since April 2019 the mushroom has been reopened under the name "Klücks Pilz".
	Oldendorf, Borgholzhausen, Gütersloh (district), North Rhine-Westphalia, Germany → Versmolder Straße (52°5′8.88″N 8°16′3.59″E)	The kiosk in Borgholzhausen-Oldendorf is used as a snack bar. The inside of the mushroom is used for food preparation, and the food can be eaten in a wooden extension. The existence of this kiosk is endangered by the further construction of the Bundesautobahn 33 between Borgholzhausen and Bielefeld. Currently, traffic is being rerouted directly past the kiosk. The completion of the closure is expected to result in a significant reduction in traffic volume. Therefore, the operator had a larger replica of the mushroom built about 1.4 kilometres southwest, at the Borgholzhausen motorway services. This snack bar is located at Kurt-Nagel-Straße 2a, with a diameter of 12 metres and has a sturdy slatted roof. Construction began on 25 June 2007 and was opened on 6 January 2008. (52°4′45.95″N 8°14′58.32″E)
	Regensburg, Bavaria, Germany → Fürst-Anselm-Allee (49°0′48.24″N 12°5′56.04″E)	The Regensburg milk mushroom on Fürst-Anselm-Allee, which has been under cultural heritage (file number D-3-62-000-1587) since 2003, replaced the prototype that was erected after the Bayreuth conference in 1952. It bears the serial type no. 38, 1954, and now serves as a coffee shop.
	Rosengarten, Harburg (district), Lower Saxony, Germany → Freilichtmuseum am Kiekeberg (Kiekerberg open-air museum), Wasserspielplatz (53°26′21.37″N 9°54′28.01″E)	The milk kiosk was delivered on 7 May 1955 to R. Scherer, operator of the station restaurant in Ingelheim am Rhein and stood opposite the north-east corner of the Ingelheim station until 1999. After mixed milk drinks and milk bars went out of fashion, it temporarily served as a taxi office. When the station was completely rebuilt, the mushroom, which in the meantime had been unoccupied, had to move. It was carefully dismantled and stored by the senior partner Dirk Gemünden of the construction company Karl Gemünden GmbH & Co. KG, who was involved in the development of the property and new building. In 2007, the open-air museum in Kiekeberg was looking for buildings for the new exhibition area "post-war period in the country". After the initial contact, Dirk Gemünden donated the mushroom kiosk to the museum on the spot. After extensive restoration, it has served as a kiosk for ice cream, drinks, and small meals in the open-air museum since 2008. In August 2014 the mushroom kiosk was recreated in a smaller version than the original in a hands-on campaign in Ingelheim and can now be rented.
	Wangen im Allgäu, Ravensburg (district), Baden-Württemberg, Germany → Festplatz (corner of Klosterbergstraße/Aumühleweg) (47°41′3.94″N 9°49′59.33″E)	The Wangen mushroom, whose wooden structure no longer corresponds to its original form, is still being managed today. During a restoration, it was equipped with new walls that now have curved windows. In recent years it has changed tenants several times, but the mushroom has always been used as a snack bar – from döner kebabs, to bratwurst, and Thai food, dishes of various nationalities are on offer in the mushroom. It received a new interior design in 2009.
	Leopoldstadt, Vienna, Austria → Wurstelprater (48°12′56.21″N 16°24′1.07″E)	The mushroom kiosk in Vienna's Wurstelprater, at the corner of Leichtweg and Jantschweg, was constructed with square wooden walls. However, the building of today's 'Schwammerlhütte' can still be recognised by its round roof shape. It is used as a snack stand for mushroom dishes.

Other surviving Waldner-mushrooms or mushroom kiosks are of unclear status:

Picture	Location	Descriptipn
	Bad Harzburg, Landkreis Goslar, Lower Saxony, Germany → Radau waterfall, Nordhäuser Straße 17 (51°51′12.97″N 10°32′49.31″E)	The mushroom kiosk on Bundesstraße 4 is used by the Radau waterfall forest restaurant to market souvenirs.
	Bad Sachsa, Göttingen (district), Lower Saxony, Germany → Hindenburgstraße 9 (51°35′51.44″N 10°33′00.63″E)	The milk mushroom in Bad Sachsa is now used for advertising by the nearby Hotel Lindenhof.
	Frankenthal, Rhineland-Palatinate, Germany → Nachtweideweg 44 (49°32′20.46″N 8°22′22.30″E)	From 1952 to 1962, the building, situated at the Frankenthal lido, was operated by the Frankethal/Palatinate dairy cooperative as a milk mushroom. From 1962 to 1978, it was used as a kiosk at its current location. Restoration followed in 1983 (roof) and 2003.
	Heidelberg, Baden-Württemberg, Germany → Neuenheimer Feld 304, directly at the Botanical Garden of the Ruprecht Karl University of Heidelberg (south-west side of the canteen) (49°24′55.00″N 8°40′12.46″E)	Whether or not the so-called "beer mushroom" is a converted milk kiosk by the Waldner company has not yet been clarified.
	Wehrda, Marburg; Marburg (district), Hesse, Germany → Marienhäuschen 9 (50°49′59.38″N 8°45′16.20″E)	In the garden of the former Zwergenschänke restaurant, at the time a popular place for excursions near Marburg-Wehrda, there is still a milk mushroom today. However, this may just be a replica.

== Miniature version ==
These "mushrooms" also became popular through miniature versions produced by the Faller company, which specialises in model railways. The model for the HO scale has been in the catalogue since 1961.
