= New Campus (Heidelberg University) =

The New Campus of the University of Heidelberg is located in the newest district of Heidelberg called Neuenheimer Feld. It is today the larger part of the university, and the largest campus for natural sciences and life science in Germany. Many buildings of the science faculties and institutes, the medical school, and the university hospital are situated on the New Campus. The science branch of the University Library is also situated here.

Most of the dormitories and the athletic facilities of the university can be found there as well. Several independent research institutes, such as the German Cancer Research Center, Max Planck Society and its Institute for Comparative Public Law and International Law have settled there. The New Campus is also seat of several biomedical spin-off companies. The ancient part of the town can be reached by streetcar in about ten minutes.

The university maintains a botanical garden at Neuenheimer Feld.
