= Olympia Fulvia Morata =

Italian classical scholar

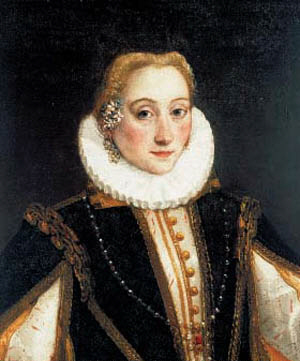
- Born: 1526/7; Ferrara, Italy
- Died: 26 October 1555; Heidelberg, Germany

Olympia Fulvia Morata (or Morato; 1526/1527 – 26 October 1555) was an Italian poet, translator and classical scholar. One of the few women in sixteenth-century Europe who worked primarily in the classical languages rather than in the vernacular, she died in Heidelberg, having left Italy due to her Protestant faith.

== Early life and activity ==
Morata was born in Ferrara to Fulvio Pellegrino Morato and Lucrezia Gozi, and was initially educated at home by her father. A former tutor in the Este court of Ferrara who was sympathetic to Protestantism, Morata's father focused her education on Latin and Greek, which she learned to read, write, and speak fluently. Morata was viewed as a prodigy, and her accomplishments were praised by other scholars such as Celio Calcagnini. Such praise was however highly gendered, with Morata also declaring her abandonment of traditional female pursuits in her poetry.

In 1539, Morata entered the court of Duke Ercole II d'Este of Ferrara, whose wife Renée of France had supported the foundation there of a school for girls led by the German humanist Kilian Senf. In addition to acting as a companion and tutor to the Duke and Duchess's daughters, between 1540 and 1548, Morata studied grammar, rhetoric, geography, Greek and Latin at the court in Ferrara, as well as deepening her knowledge of the Bible there. Her Bible studies were aided by texts that had been specially gathered for the education of girls at court, some of which would have been considered heterodox at the time. Renée's household was indeed a center of Protestantism in Italy, which besides international visitors like John Calvin also hosted Italian Protestants such as Antonio Brucioli, and Morata herself.

Morata penned a number of works during her time at the Este court. In 1540/41, she wrote and publicly debated a now-lost Defence of Cicero, and in 1542 a commentary on the Paradoxa Stoicorum of the same author. Probably between 1544 and 1545, Morata also translated the first two tales of the Decameron into Latin, removing in the process references to Catholic sacraments and adding a diatribe against the papacy. Besides her activity as a commentator and translator, Morata also composed original literary works. Around 1542, she wrote an oration in ancient Greek In Praise of Quintus [ie Gaius] Mutius Scevola, and authored poetry in both Latin and ancient Greek.

== Marriage and move to Germany ==
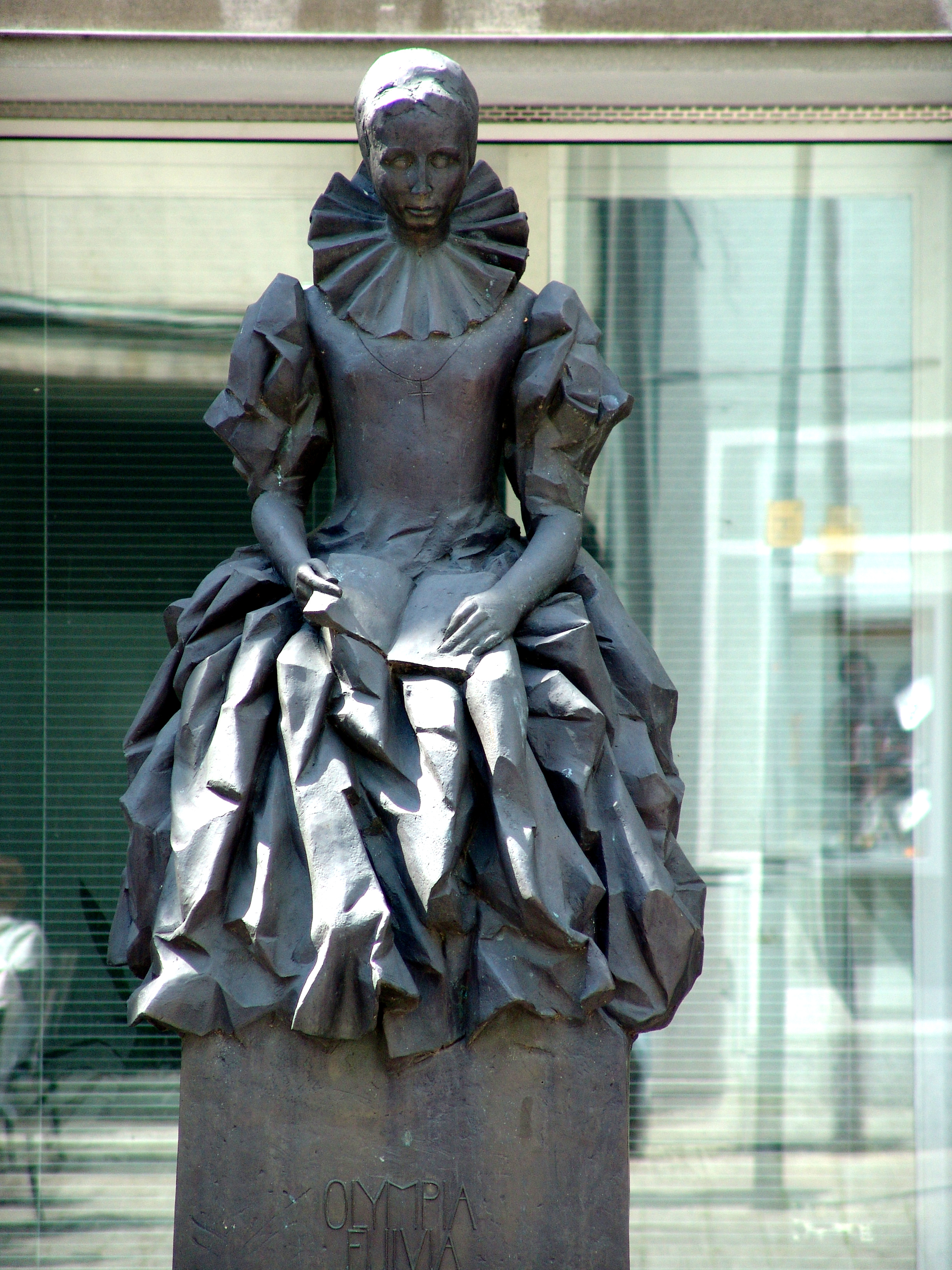
Statue of Morata in Schweinfurt, by Albert Ultsch (1997)

Morata's attachment to the Este court weakened after 1548. Her father became ill and died in that year, and Duke Ercole began to crack down on heterodoxy at court, facilitating for example the execution of Fanino Fanini despite Renée's protests. She also lost favour with Renée, perhaps due to the duchess' children being old enough to longer require a companion in their education, or to slander spread by other members of her court. Morata may also have decided to renounce courtly life in order to focus on a personal programme of especially religious study. The break with Renée was difficult, with Morata reflecting upon the episode and her upbringing as a whole in her 1550 Lavinia Roverensis Ursina et Olympia Morata colloquuntur, an imagined dialogue with her close friend Lavinia della Rovere.

Morata began to foster connections outside Italy at this time, for example sending her work to Ferdinand I and Anton Fugger. Soon after, at some point between the end of 1549 and 1550, Morata married the German medical student Andreas Grunthler (c. 1518-1555) in Ferrara. Their marriage appears to have been for love, with Morata and Grunthler expressing their affection for one another in their letters. Such letters stressed their sadness in times of separation, their support for one another's studies, and celebrated their shared religious beliefs.

Soon after their marriage, her husband found a job in the Bavarian town of Kaufbeuren as doctor to the royal counsellor Georg Hörmann, and in the summer of 1550 he, Morata, and her youngest brother Emilio (1542-1555) left Ferrara for this town. Upon her move to Germany, Morata's writings were celebrated and shared amongst German Protestants, who were eager to learn about this "new Sappho".

A year later, Morata and her family moved to her husband's home town, Schweinfurt, with Grunthler having turned down a professorship in Linz in for religious reasons. Schweinfurt was a free imperial city, and here Morata was able to freely live as a Protestant, maintaining correspondence with Protestant leaders such as Matthias Flacius Illyricus, Pier Paolo Vegerio, Melanchthon, Camerarius, and Celio Secundo Curione, and sharing Italian books with German scholars while encouraging them to translate Protestant works into Italian. Morata also took on the role of spiritual guide for friends and family from Italy, sending them copies of Protestant literature, as well as contacting her former tutee Anna d'Este to plea for mercy for accused Protestants in France.

In Schweinfurt Morata focused her studies on theology and the Bible, for example translating seven Psalms into Homeric Greek, which were then set to music after her death by her husband. In 1551 she also composed her Dialogue of Theophila and Philotima, a tract about spirituality and learning that has sometimes been considered her most important work.

== Death ==
In 1553, Schweinfurt was sacked during the Second Margrave War. Morata and her family lost all their possessions, including her library and most of her own writings. Her letters from this period describe her fleeing from the city barefoot "in nothing but a linen tunic". She and her husband were then taken prisoner in Hammelburg and sentenced to death, but were ultimately protected by the Count and Countess of Erbach. With this support, Morata and Gruntler fled in 1554 to Heidelberg, where Gruntler had been offered the chair of medicine. In Heidelberg, Morata rebuilt her library from memory, continued to study and exchange books with contacts like Curione, and offered private lessons in Latin and Greek. The last has led to the misconception that she officially taught at the University of Heidelberg.

Plaque to Morata in St Peter's, Heidelberg

Morata likely contracted tuberculosis during her flight from Schweinfurt, of which she died in Heidelberg on 26 October 1555. After her death her husband and Curione gathered her remaining works, which Curione published in Basel in 1558 with a dedication to another Protestant exile from Italy, Isabella Bresgna. Grunthler however did not live to see this edition: he and Morata's brother Emilio died soon after her from the plague. They were all buried together in the Church of St Peter in Heidelberg. Morata does not have any known children.

== Commemoration ==
Morata's letters were popular in the sixteenth century and enjoyed a revival in the late eighteenth century following Goethe's interest in them.

Morata has been commemorated with a plaque in the Church of St Peter in Heidelberg, and the Heidelberg University offers a scholarship for female scientists and doctors that is named after her. She is the subject of a FrauenOrt, a place of women's significance, and a statue in Schweinfurt, where a school has also been named after her.

== Sources ==
- Lucia Felici, "Olympia Fulvia Morata: 'Glory of Womankind both for Piety and for Wisdom'," in Fruits of Migration: Heterodox Italian Migrants and Central European Culture, 1550-1620 (Leiden: Brill, 2018), pp. 147-178.
- Anne R. Larsen; Diana Robin; Carole Levin, eds. (2007). Encyclopedia of women in the Renaissance: Italy, France, and England. ABC-CLIO, Inc.
- Olympia Morata. (2003). The Complete Writings of an Italian Heretic, ed. and trans. by Ηοlt N. Parker (Chicago: The University of Chicago Press, 2002).
- Meredith K. Ray, "Olimpia Morata (1526-1555): Humanist and Heretic," in Ray, Twenty-Five Women Who Shaped the Italian Renaissance (London: Routledge, 2024), pp. 100-111.
- Lisa Saracco (2012), "MORATO, Olimpia Fulvia - Enciclopedia". Treccani (in Italian)
- Kirsi Stjerna, "Olimpia Fulvia Morata, 1526/1527-1555 - An Italian Scholar," in Stjerna, Women and the Reformation (Oxford: Blackwell, 2009), pp. 197-212.
