= European Registry of Hereditary Pancreatitis and Pancreatic Cancer =

Registry of hereditary pancreatic diseases

The European Registry of Hereditary Pancreatitis and Pancreatic Cancer (EUROPAC) was started by John Neoptolemos and colleagues in 1997 and has become the world’s most extensive study on hereditary pancreatic diseases. It enabled discovery of several genetic characteristics causative for hereditary pancreatitis and familial pancreatic cancer.

== Description ==
EUROPAC is based at the Royal Liverpool University Hospital and it is supported by grants from Cancer Research UK, the European Union, the National Institute for Health and Care Research (NIHR), Pancreatic Cancer UK, NHS England, and Cheshire and Merseyside Cancer Alliance.

It maintains a registry of families in whom there is thought to be an increased risk of pancreatic cancer. Studies have shown that an increased risk of cancer is inferred if two or more first-degree relatives have the condition. In addition to the Familial Pancreatic Cancer (FPC) registry, EUROPAC offers screening for early pancreatic cancer on a research basis in those deemed at high risk for the development of the condition. Screening for early pancreatic cancer involves several different blood tests and scans and is usually undertaken from the age of 40 in high-risk individuals.

Patients who have a family history of pancreatic cancer or pancreatitis may be eligible to join the study. Referrals are made via genetic counsellors, GPs, other consultants or directly via email.

The research team based in Liverpool includes Annabelle Boughey (EUROPAC Operations Manager), Paul Thomas (EUROPAC Coordinator) Phil Hopley (clinical research fellow), Professor Christopher Halloran (principal investigator) and Professor William Greenhalf (lead scientist).
