= Markus Büchler =

German surgeon and university full professor

Markus Wolfgang Büchler
- Born: 22 July 1955 (age 71); Saarlouis, Saar
- Citizenship: Germany
- Education: University of Heidelberg; Free University of Berlin; University of Ulm
- Medical career
- Profession: Surgeon
- Institutions: University of Bern (Inselspital), University of Heidelberg (University Hospital Heidelberg)
- Sub-specialties: General surgery, Organ transplantation, Oncology

Markus Wolfgang Büchler (born 22 July 1955) is a German surgeon and university full professor. He specialises in gastrointestinal, hepatobiliary and transplant surgery, and is especially known for pioneering operations on the pancreas.

== Early life and education ==
Büchler was born in Saarlouis, Saar Protectorate (nowadays Saarland federated state in south-west Germany) to Eugene Büchler, a medical internist, and his wife Erika. He spent his school years in Dillingen and in the catholic boarding school Lender in Sasbach in 1974. Markus W. Büchler is married to Hedwig Maria Breunig-Büchler and has four children.

From 1974 to 1979, Büchler studied medicine at the University of Heidelberg. Subsequently, he trained in general and cardiovascular surgery at the Free University of Berlin, where, upon completion of the training in 1980, he obtained the medical license. In the same year, he defended his doctoral thesis and received the Doctor of Medicine degree from the University of Heidelberg.

He further specialised in surgery at the University of Ulm, where he qualified for habilitation and was appointed an attending surgeon in 1987. In Ulm Büchler met his English colleague John Neoptolemos and together they founded the European Study for Pancreas Cancer Research (ESPAC). In 1991 he became associate professor and the vice chairman of the Department of Surgery at the University of Ulm. In 1993, Büchler moved to Switzerland where he became professor of surgery and chairman of the Department of Visceral and Transplantation Surgery at the University of Bern, Inselspital. In 1999 he also headed the Department of Gastrointestinal, Liver and Lung Diseases at the University of Bern, Inselspital. In June 2000, he received a call from the Chair of General and Visceral Surgery at the University of Ulm, but he did not succeed. In 2001, he returned to Germany and took up the call to the full professorship of surgery and became chairman of the Department of General, Visceral and Transplantation Surgery at Heidelberg University Hospital. Since 2003 he has been managing medical director of the Department of Surgery at Heidelberg University Hospital. In parallel, he heads the Departments of Surgery at Salem hospital in Heidelberg since 2005, at the General Hospital in Sinsheim since 2009, at the General Hospital in Eberbach since 2012, and at the General Hospital in Heppenheim since 2013. In 2023 Buechler left Heidelberg to start working as director of the newly founded Botton-Champalimaud Pancreatic Cancer Center in Lisbon, Portugal

Markus W. Büchler is a surgical expert for diseases of the gastrointestinal tract and especially the hepatobiliary system. His surgical focus is on hepatobiliary, colorectal, and pancreatic surgery and transplant surgery. As a surgeon, he has developed new surgical methods and, with his staff in Heidelberg, carries out more than 800 operations at the pancreas per year. At his initiative, the European Pancreas Center was established at Heidelberg University Hospital. As an academic surgeon, he specializes in translational medicine, oncological surgery and the development of new surgical techniques. He is co-author of more than 2,500 scientific publications focused on gastrointestinal cancers, pancreatic diseases and clinical surgical issues.

Among others, Markus Büchler was elected president of the Swiss Society for Visceral Surgery in 1999 and 2000, vice-president of the Swiss Surgical Society in 2000, president of the European Pancreatic Club in 2002, president of the International Hepato-Pancreato-Biliary Association (IHPBA, 2006–2008), chairman of the German Society for General and Visceral Surgery (DGAV) for the 2010-2011 period and president of the German Surgical Society of Surgery (DGCH) in 2012. He acts as an editor and a member of editorial boards of international medical journals., has been Editor-in-Chief of Digestive Surgery since 1995, and from 2010 until 2023 he was Editor-in-Chief of Langenbeck's Archives of Surgery.

== Scientific merits ==
Since 2009 Markus Büchler is a member of the German Academy of Sciences Leopoldina.

Büchler is an honorary member of numerous professional societies, including the Royal Society of Medicine of England since 1998, the Royal College of Surgeons of England since 2009, the American Surgical Association since 2010 and the American College of Surgeons since 2013. He has received multiple awards, like in 2016 the Lifetime Achievement Award of the European Pancreatic Club (EPC), in 2020 the Living Legend Status of the International Hepato-Pancreato-Biliary Association (IHPBA), and in 2021 the Award of the German Cancer Society.

Büchler has been awarded the degree of an Honorary Professor by the Railway Medical College of Nanjing, PR China, by the Southeast University of Nanjing, PR China, by the Huazhong University of Science and Technology in Wuhan, China, by the University of the Republic in Montevideo, Uruguay, by the Nanjing Medical University, PR China, and by the University of Prague, Czech Republic. He has been awarded an honorary medical doctorate by the Iuliu Hațieganu University of Medicine and Pharmacy in Cluj-Napoca, the Vasile Goldiş West University in Arad, Romania, the University of Belgrade, Serbia, the Belarusian Medical Academy of Post-Graduate Education in Minsk, by Vilnius University, Lithuania, by the Nanjing Medical University, PR China, and by the University of Pécs, Hungary.

== Awards (selection) ==
- Ludwig Rehn Award of the Middle Rhine Area Association of Surgeons (1987)
- Research Award of the Society of Computed Body Tomography and Magnetic Resonance (1991)
- Award of the European Association for Gastroenterology and Endoscopy (1993)
- Research Prize of the Swiss Society of Surgery (1995)
- Surgery Prize of the Swiss Society of Surgery (1996)
- Max Siurala Award, Finnish Society of Gastroenterology (2005)
- Anthony Gimbernat Award, Catalan Society of Surgery (2005)
- Hippocrates Award, Hellenic Society for Internal Medicine (2006)
- Amundsen Medal of the Institute for Surgical Research University of Oslo (2013)
- Rudolf-Zenker Prize of the German Surgical Association (DGCH) (2014)
- Lifetime-Senator Status of the German Surgical Association (DGCH) (2016)
- Lifetime Achievement Award of the European Pancreatic Club (2016).
- Karl-Heinrich-Bauer-Prize of the German Surgical Association (DGCH) (2018)
- In November 2018 Expertscape recognized Dr. Büchler as #3 in the world for expertise in Pancreatic Cancer.
- Deutscher Krebspreis (2021) of the German Cancer Society

== Books (selection) ==
- Diseases of the Pancreas: Acute Pancreatitis, Chronic Pancreatitis, Neoplasms of the Pancreas. Karger 2004, ISBN 3-8055-7613-7
- Chronic Pancreatitis. Wiley-Blackwell 2002, ISBN 0-632-06399-8
