= Neuenheimer Feld =

Coordinates: 49°25′00″N 8°40′12″E

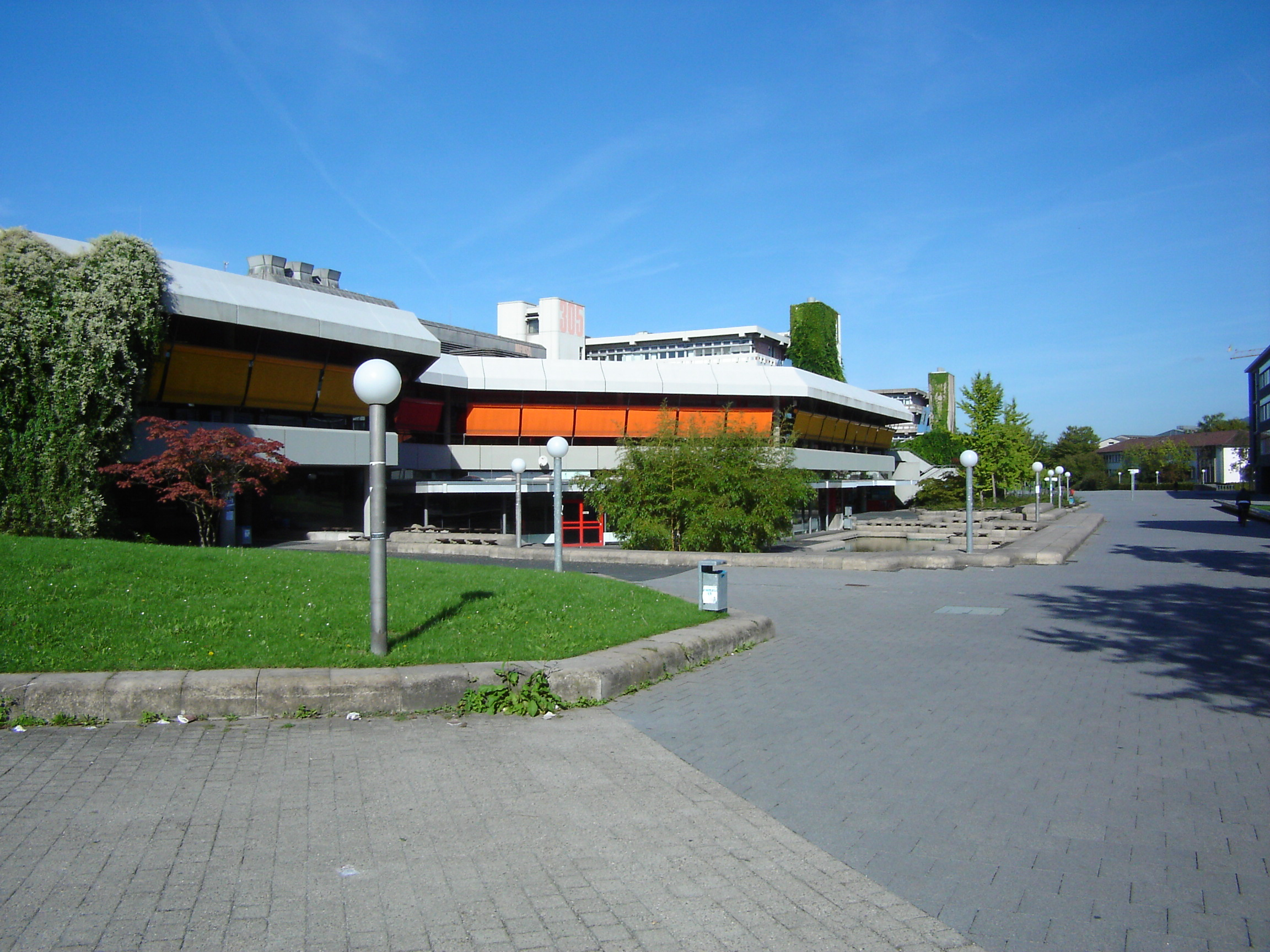
Campus of Heidelberg University in Neuenheimer Feld

Neuenheimer Feld is an area in the city of Heidelberg, Baden-Württemberg, Germany. The area lies on the north side of the Neckar river and consists mostly of buildings associated with the University of Heidelberg, including student accommodation and research facilities, as well as the University Hospital Heidelberg. The German Cancer Research Center (DKFZ) and the Max Planck Society also have facilities on the site.

On maps, addresses and in local language, the area is often referred to as "Im Neuenheimer Feld" (INF), with the inclusion of the German word "Im" meaning "in the".

On 24 January 2022, Neuenheimer Feld became the site of a deadly school shooting.

== See also ==
- New Campus (University of Heidelberg)
