= St. Peter's Church, Heidelberg =

Church building in Heidelberg, Germany

Coordinates: 49°24′34″N 8°42′21″E

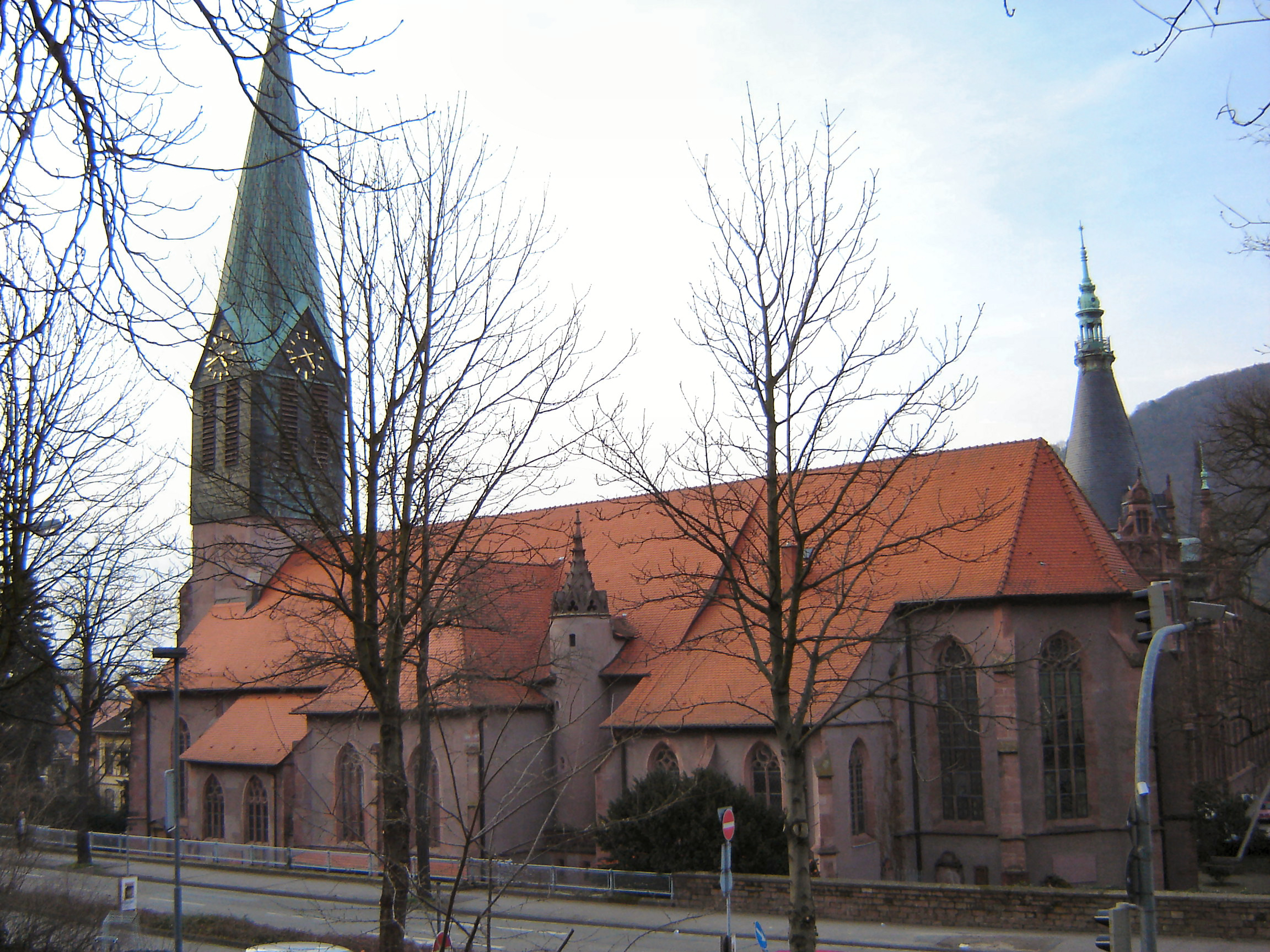
The Church of St Peter from the southeast.

St. Peter's Church (German: Peterskirche) is the oldest church in the old town (Altstadt) of Heidelberg, Germany. It has generally served as the university church of the University of Heidelberg since the late Middle Ages.

== History ==
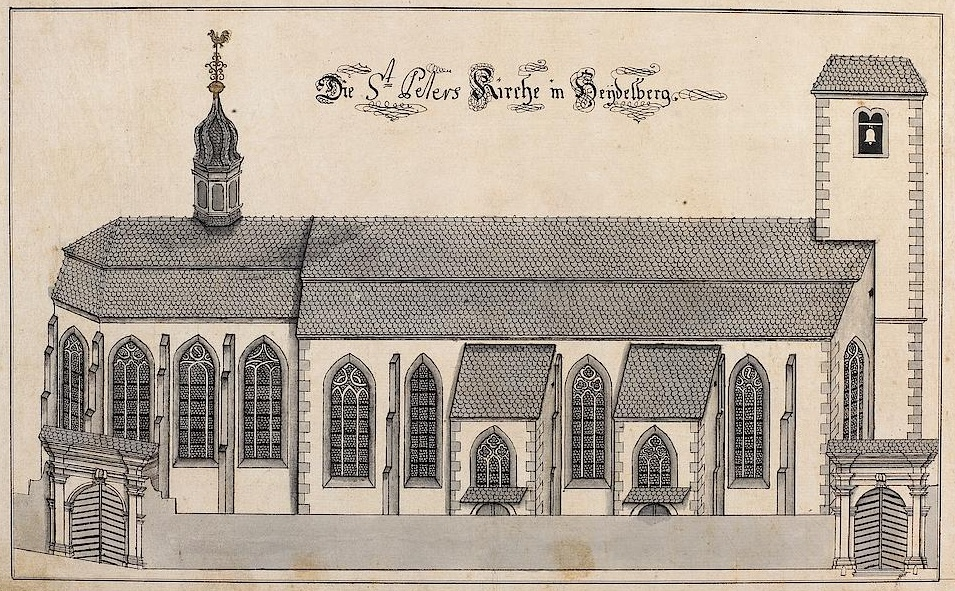
St. Peter's Church in Johann Franz Capellini von Wickenburg's Thesaurus Palatinus (1747/52)

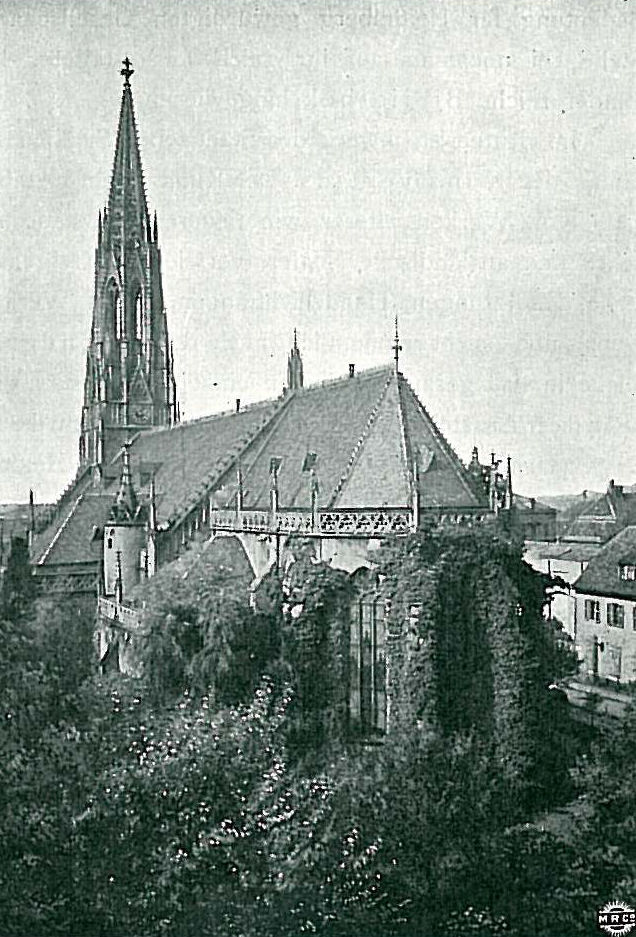
The Church of St Peter with its original Neo-Gothic tower, photograph from 1896.

The earliest precursor of St. Peter's Church had already been built by the twelfth century, before the foundation of Heidelberg itself. It first appears in the sources in 1196 with the mention of a "plebanus Kunrad zu heidelberch", that is a parish priest named Konrad, based at Heidelberg. The church was donated by the Prince-Bishopric of Worms, since it possessed the area where Heidelberg was established. The name of the church indicates a connection with Worms Cathedral, which also stands under the patronage of St Peter. In 1225, the area was given to the Palatinate as a fief and Heidelberg was founded as a city. However, the church was left outside the walls of the newly founded city, which consisted of only the eastern half of the modern Altstadt of Heidelberg (the city walls were roughly in line with Grabengasse and Seminarstrasse). St. Peter's Church was the parish church of the city of Heidelberg until the construction of the larger Church of the Holy Spirit in the 14th century.

From 1400, St. Peter's Church, St Laurentius' in Altdorf bei Nürnberg, and St. James' in Lauda-Königshofen were the proprietary churches of the University of Heidelberg; they were withdrawn from the control of their diocesan bishops and placed immediately under the authority of the Pope. The Holy See entrusted administration of these parishes to the dean of the Stiftskirche, Neustadt an der Weinstraße, Heilmann von Wattenheim (died 1411), who was thereby essentially promoted to the status of a Papal archdeacon. The university's patronage of the three churches lasted until the beginning of the Reformation, when the church became Protestant.

After Maximilian I took power in Heidelberg, the Dominican Johann Andreas Coppenstein served as Catholic parish priest of the church from 1624 to 1630. He was a famous theological writer and sought to reorganise Catholicism there, without success.

After the Badian union of the Lutheran and Calvinist churches in 1821, St. Peter's Church lost some of its significance.

Since 1896, the church has been the university church of Heidelberg.

== Building history ==
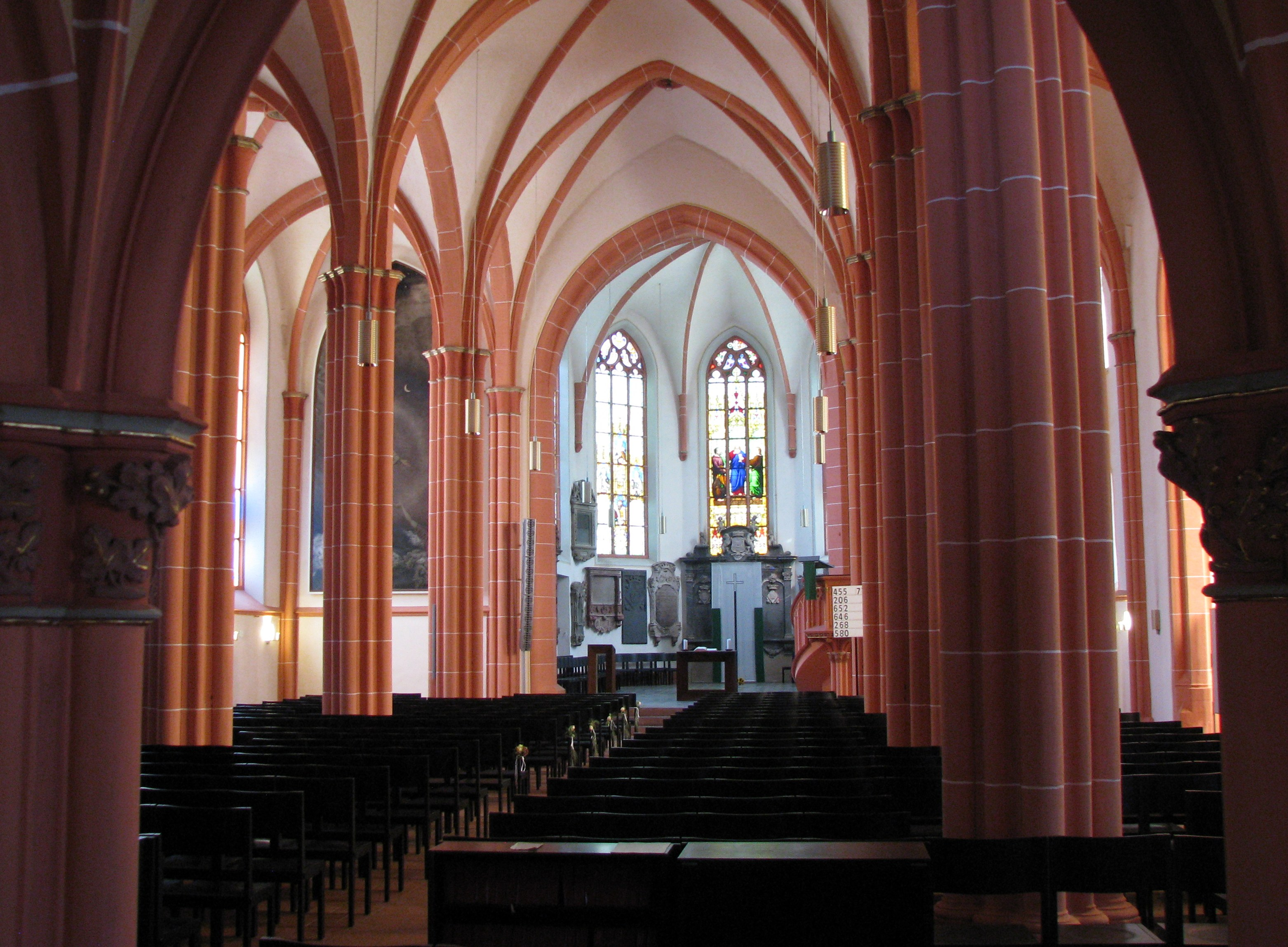
Interior view, looking up the nave to the choir.

The original appearance of the church is not known. Between 1485 and 1496 it was rebuilt in the late Gothic style and greatly expanded. The foundation stone of the new structure was laid on 16 March 1485 by Alexander Bellendörfer (died 1512), the chancellor and prothonotary of Electoral Palatinate, whose epitaph is also preserved in the church. While evidence for late Romanesque and High Gothic predecessors is lacking, the late Gothic structure remains an important component of the modern church (walls of the choir and nave). In 1496, two chapels were added to the nave on the north and south sides. The sacristy was built later on the south side.

The destruction of the city in 1689 and 1693 left the church a burnt-out ruin with the stump of a tower. The interior was rebuilt in the style of a baroque aisleless transept church.

Thanks to the support of the university the money which the church had received from the sale of its lands to allow the construction of the Odenwald railway in 1859/60, the church was heavily renovated from 1864 to 1870, under the direction of Ludwig Franck-Marperger, in the form of a three-aisle hall church in the then-dominant Neo-Gothic style. Only the choir, the old sacristy, and the university chapel retain their Medieval appearance. In 1883, the 400th birthday of Martin Luther, a Luther oak was planted in his honour. For the university's jubilee in 1884, the church's tower was remodelled in the form of Freiburg Minster. To protect the filigree spire from weathering, it was subsequently covered over with a copper roof.

In 2004/5, an elaborate renovation of the interior was carried out, including a new altar, pulpit, baptismal font, Easter candlestick, and a free-standing cross in the choir, made by the artist Matthias Eder out of COR-TEN steel. In July 2006, four new church windows were installed by the glass-artist Johannes Schreiter. Three windows are located in the southern side-chapel, the "University chapel" with the themes of "encounter," "resurrection," and "persecution." In the northern side-chapel, which serves as a space for prayer and meditation, is a window with the theme of "peace." In March 2008, a modern sculpture of Jesus by the Korean artist Lee Choon-Mann was installed there.

From January 2010, the drafts of five windows were present in the nave. The three largest windows were "Holy Spirit" and "Baptism" on the north side and "Heavenly Jerusalem" on the south side. Two smaller windows were made with the themes of "Worth" and "Sacrament". These five windows were installed between November 2010 and July 2012, completing a cycle of nine windows by Schreiter.

== Use ==
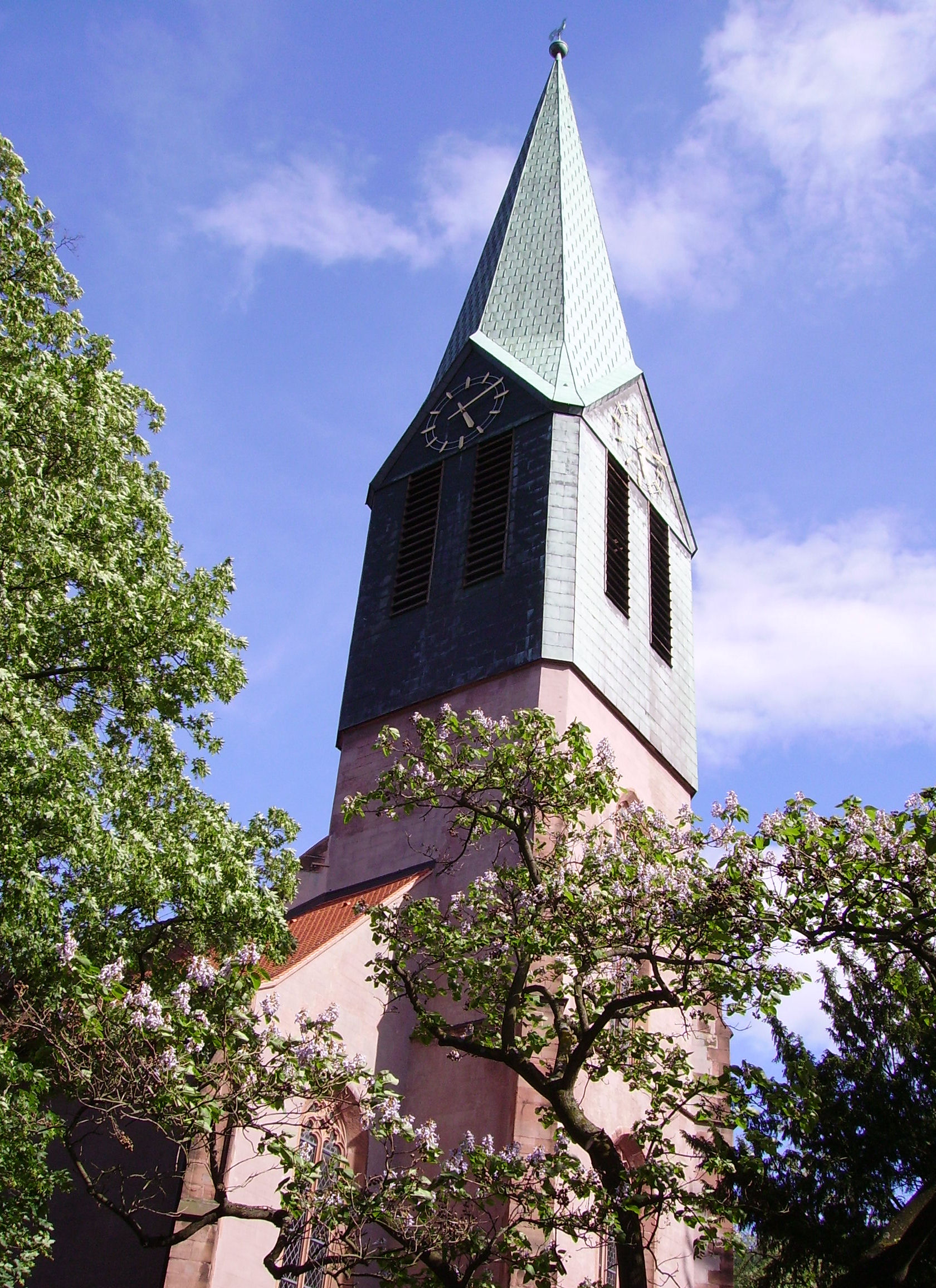
Tower of St. Peter's Church

It is owned by the Protestant Association for the care of Schönau, but is not located in any parish. Instead, according to the agreement of 1896, it serves as the church of University of Heidelberg.

The church hosts Protestant University church services on Sundays and religious holidays, as well as numerous concerts. Members of the Heidelberg theological faculty and the parish priests of the Protestant Student Society (ESG) of Heidelberg. Responsibility for university services is held by the university priest, who is elected by the ministerial convention that contains all ordinary members of the Theology faculty, in partnership with the chapter elected by the society. The church is also the site of public discussions ("Peterskirchendialog"), with speakers including Nikolaus Schneider (2011), Günther Beckstein and Konstantin von Notz (2012), Wolfgang Huber and Volker Beck (2013), Franz Müntefering (2014), Ralf Kabelka and Gisela Matthiae (2015), Olav Fykse Tveit, Ralf Kabelka, and Ralf Kabelka (2016), and Martin Dutzmann, Peter Scheben, Klaus-Dieter Ordemann and Kiflemariam Gebrewold (2017). It also hosts the "Academic lunchbreak" (Akademische Mittagspause) on weekdays during the university term, at which short academic presentations are delivered for a general audience.

Numerous professors are buried in the church, including Marsilius of Inghen, the founding rector of the university. His grave is no longer preserved, but in 2011 625 graves were. At the university's jubilee, a plaque was set up in the side chapel of the University for Marsilius. There are around a hundred and fifty epitaphs of university professors and members of the Electorate court on the inner and outer walls of the church. An honorific plaque in the southern side chapel commemorates the poet and humanist Olympia Fulvia Morata. The partially preserved church cemetery was the main cemetery of the city while it lay outside the city walls. At the southeastern corner on the outside there is a university plaque commemorating the victims of war and tyranny. This is also the site of the gravestone of the Swiss textile merchant Hans Jacob Rieter, who was beaten to death in a robbery in 1811 by Hölzerlips' gang.

== Organ ==
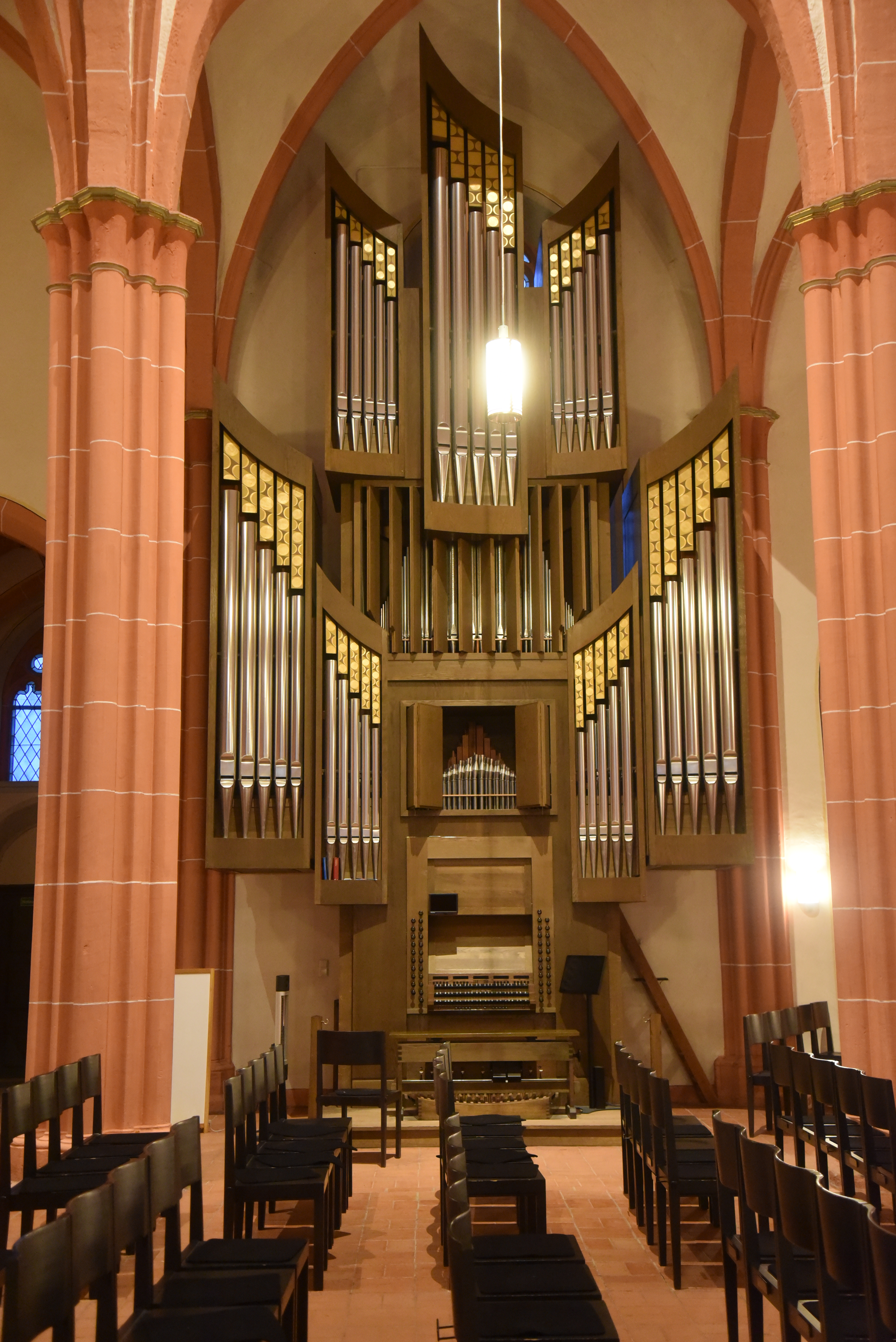
Organ

The organ of St. Peter's Church was built by the organ firm Klais Orgelbau (Bonn) in 1984. The instrument has 34 stops in three manuals and pedal keyboards. The tracker action is mechanical.

== Bibliography ==
- Hans Gercke: Kirchen in Heidelberg, Großer Kunstführer vol. 258, Schnell und Steiner, Regensburg 2011, ISBN 978-3-7954-2413-8
- Tobias Habicht, Stefan Karcher, Hanna Reichel (ed.), "… zu schauen die schönen Gottesdienste des Herrn". Eine homiletische Festschrift zu Adolf Martin Ritters 80. Geburtstag, Impulse aus der Heidelberger Universitätskirche vol. 4, Universitätsverlag Winter Heidelberg 2013, ISBN 978-3-8253-6268-3
- Charlotte Magin, Helmut Schwier (ed.): Kanzel, Kreuz und Kamera konkret. Ein Gottesdienstprogramm aus Heidelberg, Evangelische Verlagsanstalt, Leipzig 2008, ISBN 978-3-374-02646-3
- Adolf von Oechelhaeuser (ed.): Die Kunstdenkmäler des Amtsbezirks Heidelberg (Kreis Heidelberg). (Die Kunstdenkmäler des Grossherzogtums Baden, Volume 8, part 2). Tübingen, 1913; Online: http://diglit.ub.uni-heidelberg.de/diglit/kdm8bd2
- Helmut Schwier (ed.): Geöffnet. Raum und Wort in der Heidelberger Universitätskirche, Verlag Otto Lembeck Frankfurt am Main 2006, ISBN 3-87476-514-8
- Helmut Schwier, Michael Welker (ed.), Schöpfung: glauben – loben – handeln. Predigten und Reflexionen zu Natur und Schöpfung. Impulse aus der Heidelberger Universitätskirche Vol. 1, Universitätsverlag Winter, Heidelberg 2010, ISBN 978-3-8253-5836-5
- Helmut Schwier (ed.): Zwischen Torheit und Weisheit, Impulse aus der Heidelberger Universitätskirche Vol. 2, Universitätsverlag Winter, Heidelberg 2011, ISBN 978-3-8253-5958-4
- Helmut Schwier (ed.): Begegnungen, Vertreibungen, Kriege. Gedenkbuch zur Geschichte der Universität Heidelberg, Universitätsverlag Winter, Heidelberg 2011, ISBN 978-3-8253-5906-5
- Helmut Schwier, Hans-Georg Ulrichs (ed.): Nötig zu wissen. Heidelberger Beiträge zum Heidelberger Katechismus, Impulse aus der Heidelberger Universitätskirche Vol. 3, Universitätsverlag Winter Heidelberg 2012, ISBN 978-3-8253-6131-0
- Helmut Schwier: Der Fensterzyklus von Johannes Schreiter in der Peterskirche Heidelberg. Schnell Kunstführer no. 2826, Regensburg 2013, ISBN 978-3-7954-6955-9
- Helmut Schwier (ed.): Botschaften aus Licht und Glas. Der Fensterzyklus von Johannes Schreiter in der Heidelberger Universitätskirche. Verlag Schnell und Steiner, Regensburg 2013, ISBN 978-3-7954-2776-4
- Anneliese Seeliger-Zeiss: Die Ev. Peterskirche – Universitätskirche Heidelberg, Schnell Kunstführer No. 1595, 2nd expanded edition 2006, ISBN 3-7954-5303-8
- Christoph Strohm (ed.): Orte der Reformation – Heidelberg und die Kurpfalz, Ev. Verlagsanstalt, Leipzig 2013, ISBN 978-3-374-03144-3
- Theo Sundermeier: „Den Frieden lasse ich euch …“ Die Schreiter-Fenster in der Peterskirche in Heidelberg, hg. von der Evangelischen Universitätsgemeinde Heidelberg und der Evangelischen Stiftung Pflege Schönau, Otto Lembeck, Frankfurt am Main 2008, ISBN 978-3-87476-562-6
- Joachim Wambsganß (ed.): Universum für Alle. 70 spannende Fragen und kurzweilige Antworten, Springer, Berlin / Heidelberg 2013, ISBN 978-3-8274-3053-3
