= Heidelberg University School of Medicine =

Medical school in Baden-Württemberg

Coordinates: 49°25′11″N 8°40′3″E

The Heidelberg University School of Medicine (also known as the Medical Faculty of Heidelberg, German: Medizinische Fakultät Heidelberg) is one of twelve schools at Heidelberg University. It was one of the four original faculties of the university in 1386. Today, it encompasses 22 institutes and maintains a close relationship to the University Hospital Heidelberg.

Its medical degree program comprises two years of basic science, followed by the first of three steps of the German medical licensing examination, and four years of clinical studies. From 2001 on, all medical students at Heidelberg University, University Hospital Heidelberg (as opposed to the Heidelberg University Faculty of Medicine in Mannheim) pursue a reformed, six-year-long course called "HeiCuMed" ("Heidelberger Curriculum Medicinale"). This degree course is an adapted version of the Harvard Medical School curriculum. Undergraduate, graduate, and postgraduate programs of Heidelberg University Medical School have played a key role in Heidelberg being awarded "University of Excellence" status by the German Universities Excellence Initiative.

== Noted physicians ==
- Markus Büchler
- Vincenz Czerny
- Thomas Erastus
- Wilhelm Heinrich Erb
- Harald zur Hausen
- Hermann von Helmholtz
- Ludolf von Krehl
- Albrecht Kossel
- Otto Meyerhof
- Hans Spemann
- Otto Warburg
- Adolf Kussmaul
- Bert Sakmann

== Rankings ==
University rankings

By subject – Global & National
QS Medicine 2022	=29	1
THE Clinical and Health 2023	=38	2
ARWU Clinical Medicine 2022	17	1

CHE Ranking 2020 – National
Medicine
Overall study situation	● 1.6
Study organisation	● 1.5
Support in the study entry phase	● 9/14 pts.
Publications per professor	● 23.1

The Heidelberg University School of Medicine has been consistently ranked at or near the top of rankings of German medical schools.

In the national 2020 CHE University Ranking, the department is rated in the top group in 23 out of 25 criteria.
