= Nanjing Medical University =

Public university in Nanjing, Jiangsu, China

Coordinates: 32.0458°N 118.7690°E

- 南京医科大学
- Type: Medical
- Established: 1934; 92 years ago
- President: Hongbing Shen
- Academic staff: More than 1470 registered faculty members, 117 full professors and 175 associate professors, 185 supervisors of doctoral programs and 812 supervisors of master's programs
- Location: Nanjing, Jiangsu, China
- Campus: Urban
- Website: www.njmu.edu.cn

Nanjing Medical University (NJMU; 南京医科大学) is a provincial public university in Nanjing, Jiangsu, China. It is affiliated with the Province of Jiangsu. The university is part of the Double First-Class Construction.

The school was originally established in 1934 in Zhenjiang, but subsequently relocated to Nanjing in 1957. The university has two main campuses: Wutai and Jiangning, both of which have international student apartments.

The university started an English taught Bachelor of Medicine, Bachelor of Surgery (MBBS) program from 2005, as approved by the Ministry of Education of the People's Republic of China (MOE).

== History ==
National Jiangsu Medical College was founded in 1934 and was renamed Nanjing Medical College in 1957 when it moved to Nanjing. It was among the first medical universities in China to offer six-year programs in 1962. In 1981 it was approved to offer master's and doctoral degree programs. It was renamed Nanjing Medical University in 1993 and is now among the top Chinese medical universities.

== Location ==
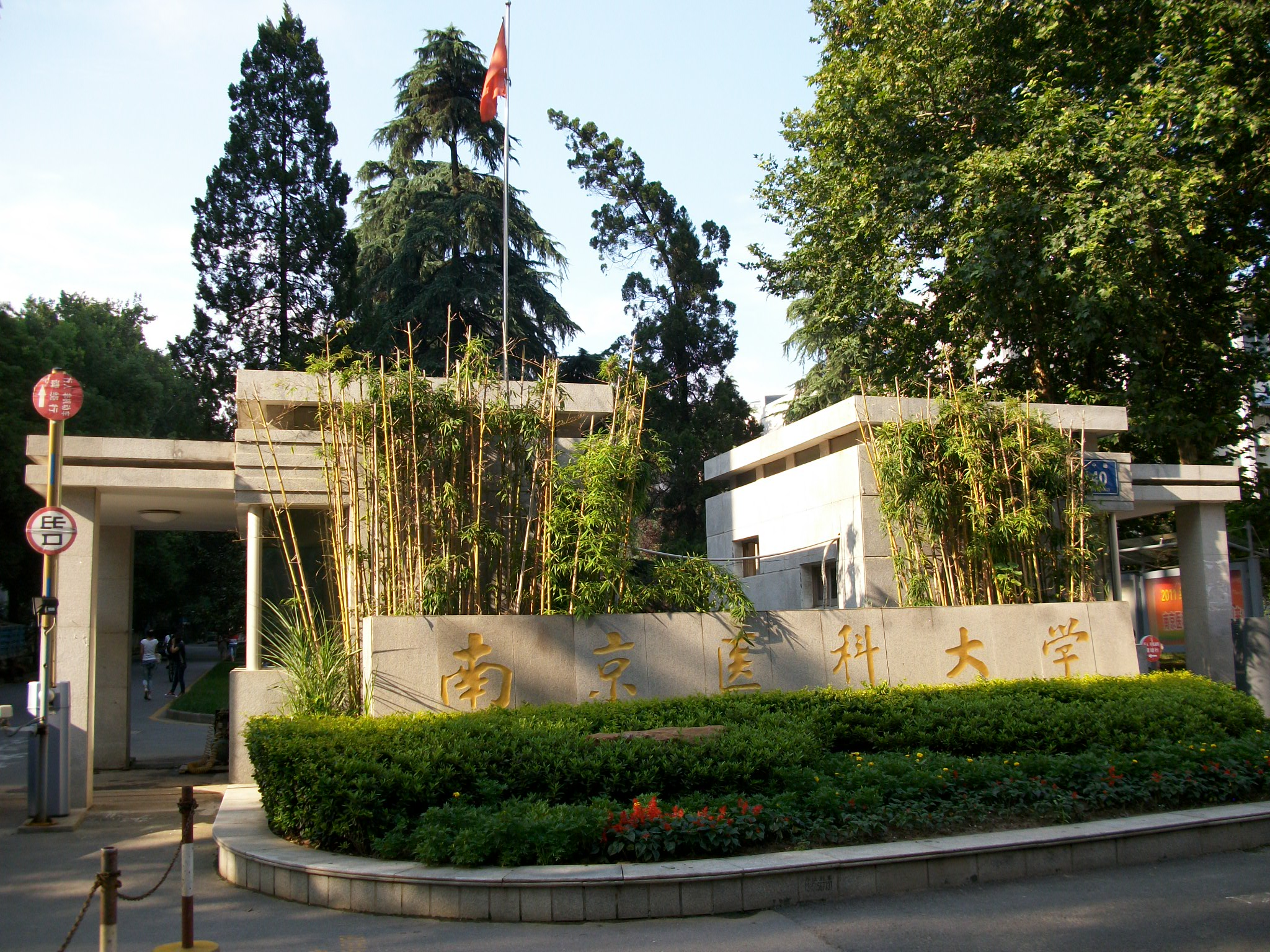
Front gate

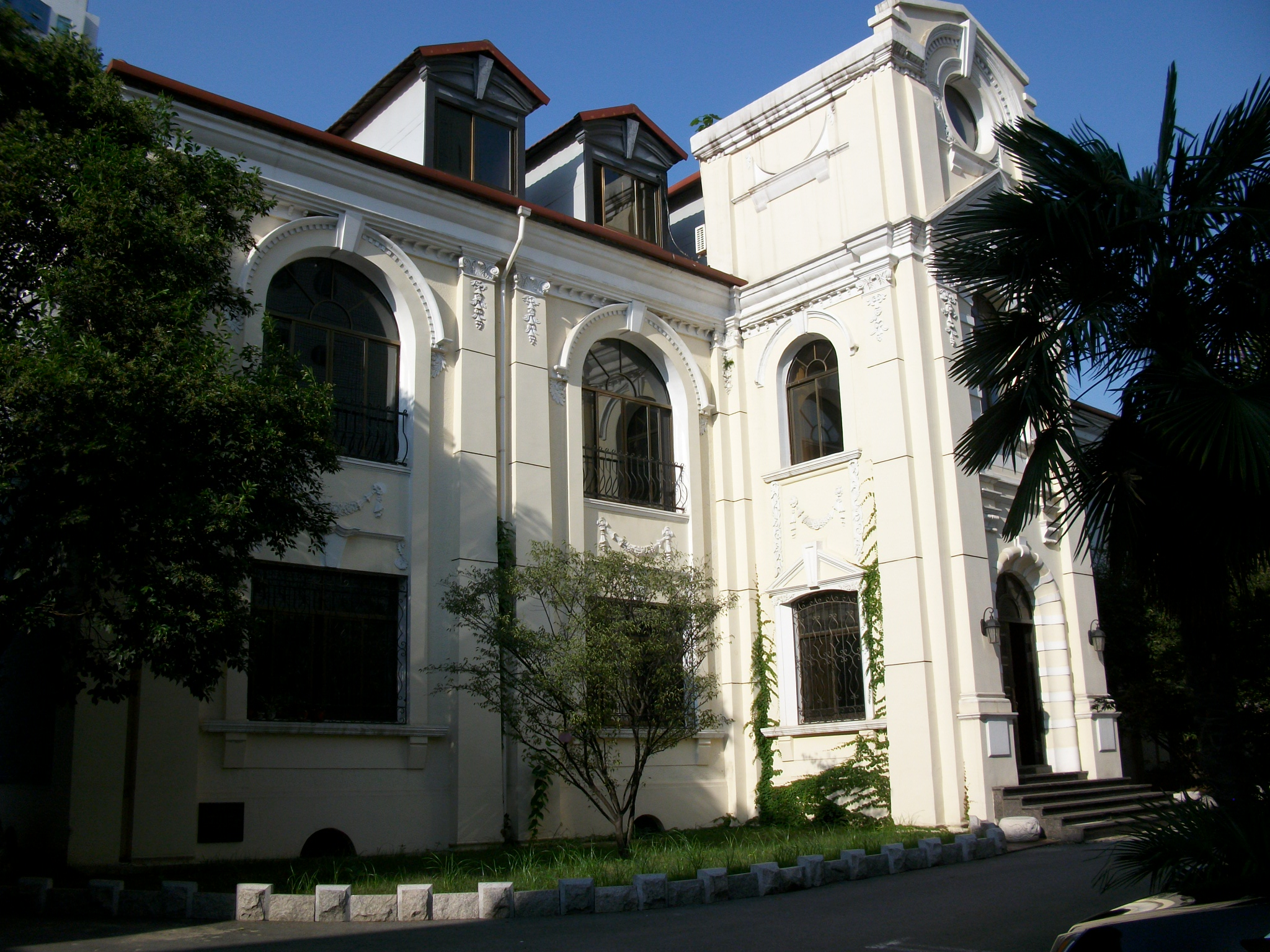
Bainiantang (百年堂), or Century Church, in former Jinling Seminary, Now in Nanjing Medical University.

As of 2020, Nanjing Medical University has two campuses. The main campus is Wutai with a land area of 8 hectares, and the New Campus is Jiangning (comprising 87 hectares), which is almost 11 times bigger than the Wutai campus. Wutai is the center of Clinical Teaching and research.

== Programs ==
The school offers bachelor's, master's, and Ph.D degree and post-doctoral research programs. Its facilities consists of an independent school, Kangda College, and 16 secondary schools. Most of the schools are for the study of medicine, public health, or other medical care fields including: the School of Basic Medical Sciences, First School of Clinical Medicine, Second School of Clinical Medicine, Third School of Clinical Medicine, Fourth School of Clinical Medicine, Gulou School of Clinical Medicine, School of Public Health, School of Stomatology, School of Pharmaceutical Sciences, School of Nursing, and School of Medical Policy and Management. Other schools are the College of International Studies, School of Continuing Education, School of Higher Vocational and Technical Education, and School of International Education. NMU has 24 affiliated hospitals and around 50 teaching hospitals. These hospitals are spread in Jiangsu, Zhejiang and Shandong provinces.

NMU has more than 1,400 registered faculty members, including 117 full professors and 175 associate professors. There are 812 supervisors of the master's program and 185 supervisors of the doctoral programs. The University states that it has "one academician of the Chinese Academy of Engineering, one Chang Jiang Scholar Distinguished Visiting Professor, two recruited global experts from the National "Thousand Talent" Program, six winners of the China National Funds for Distinguished Young Scientists, one winner of the National Award for Distinguished Teachers, five winners of the funds from New Century Excellent Talent Support Program of the Ministry of Education, nine Jiangsu Specially-Appointed Professors, three "State-Level Teaching Teams", and one "Innovation Team" from the Ministry of Education."

It has an international exchange and cooperation program in which sends instructors overseas for studies and works with scientific research institutions and medical schools in the Britain, United States of America, Australia, Germany, Japan and France. By 2014, there were more than 500 foreign students. NMU is a partner organization with the Alliance for Health Policy and Systems Research at the World Health Organization.
