= Botanical Garden of the University of Heidelberg =

Botanical garden in Germany

Coordinates: 49°25′00″N 8°40′10″E

- Interactive map of Botanical Garden of the University of Heidelberg
- Type: Botanical garden
- Operator: University of Heidelberg

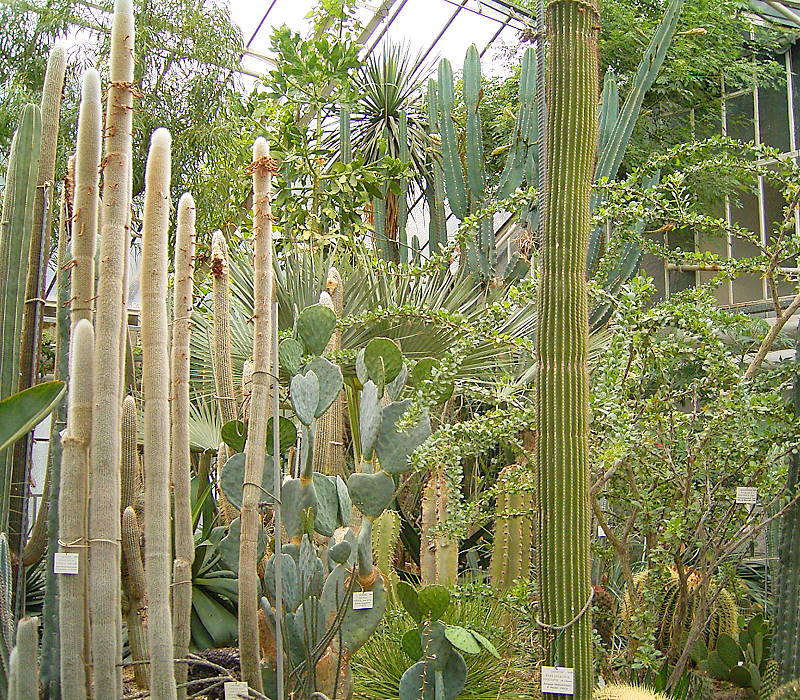
Greenhouse of the succulents

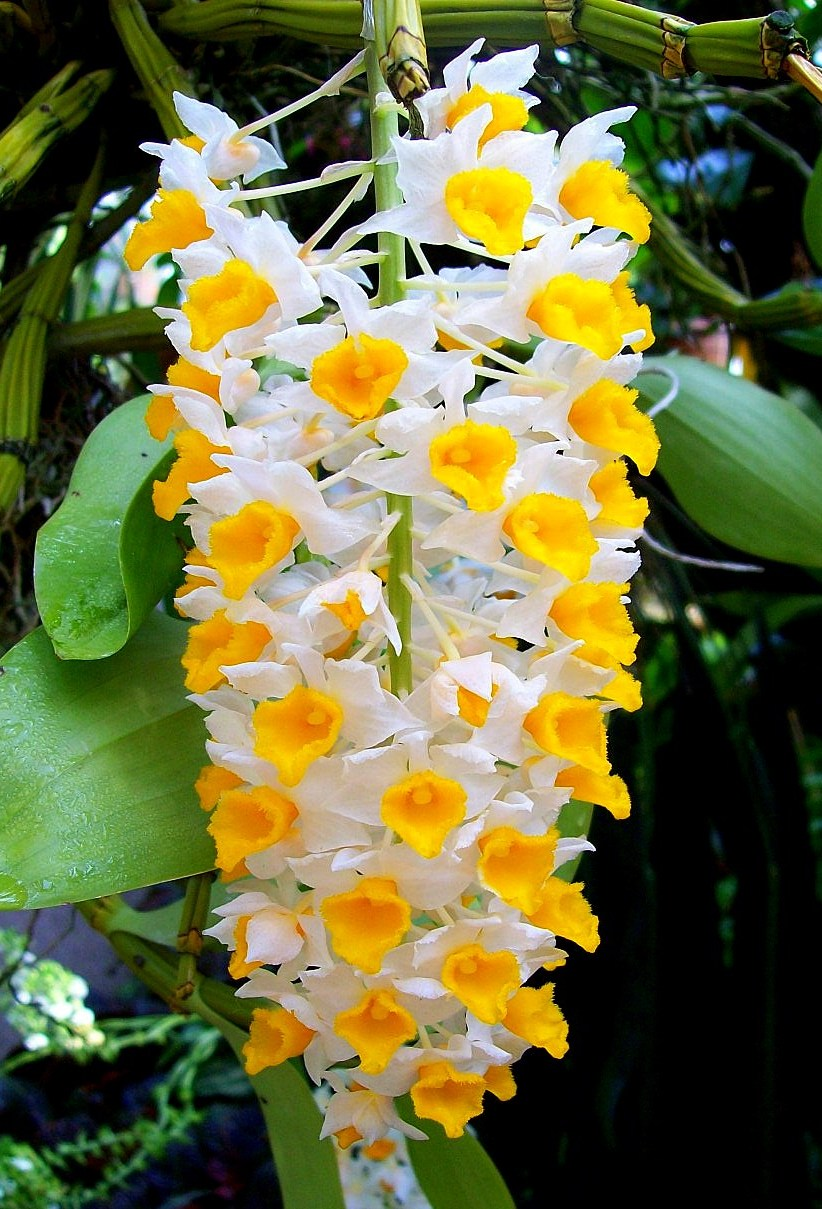
Orchid in the tropical greenhouse

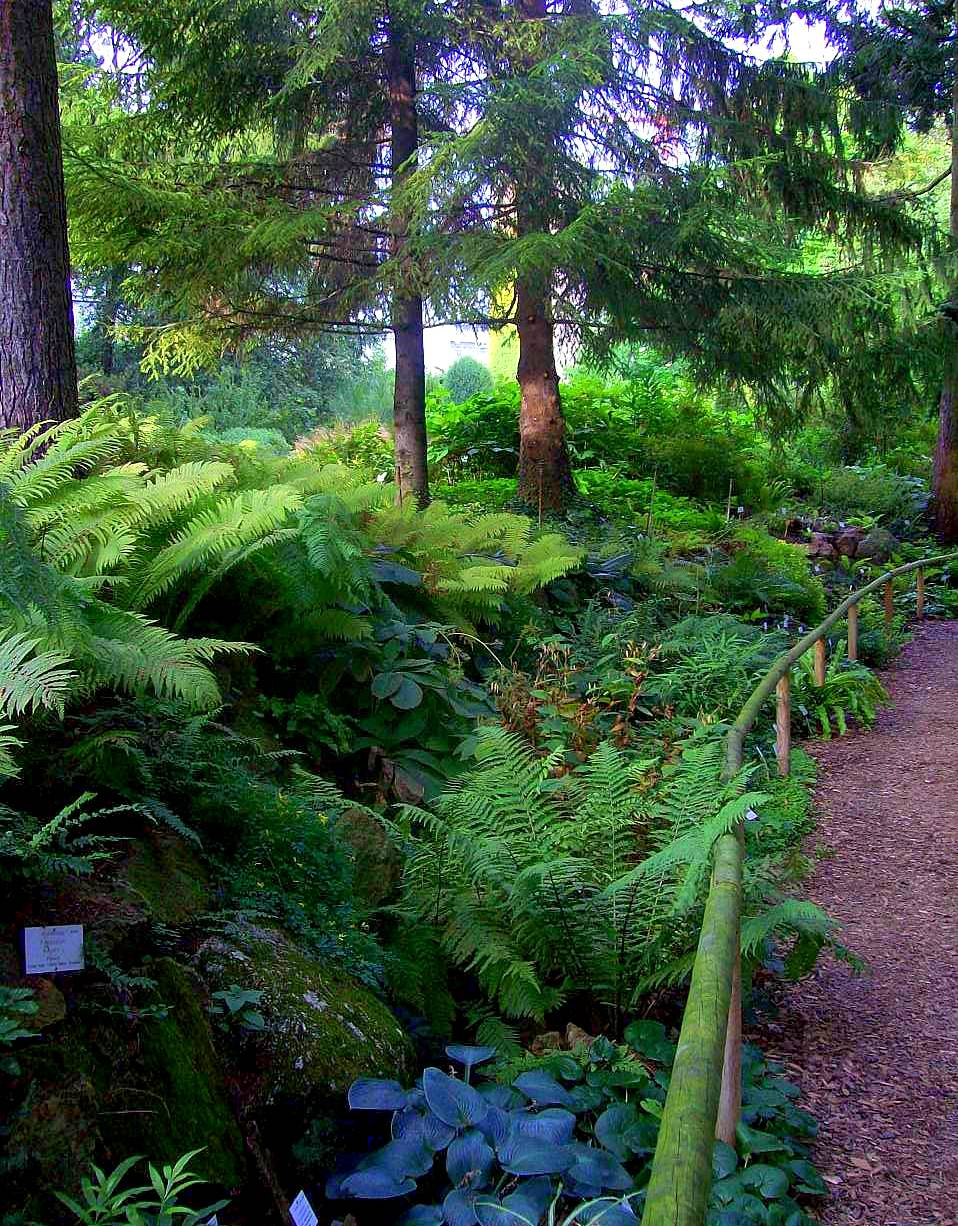
Fern ravine

The Botanischer Garten der Universität Heidelberg (2 hectares), also known as the Botanischer Garten Heidelberg, is a botanical garden maintained by the University of Heidelberg. It is located at Im Neuenheimer Feld 340, New Campus, Heidelberg, Baden-Württemberg, Germany; portions are open to the public daily except Saturday without charge.

The garden was established in 1593 as a hortus medicus for the University of Heidelberg. As such, it is the third oldest botanical garden in Germany, but has moved seven times since its establishment. The present site was created in 1915 by Georg Albrecht Klebs and head gardener Erich Behnick. It was severely damaged in World War II but has subsequently been rebuilt.

Today the garden contains over 14,000 plant taxa, with a primary focus on its greenhouse collections (4000 m^{2} total area), with strengths in succulents, orchids, and bromeliads. The following 11 special collections form its core holdings:

- Aristolochiaceae
- Bromeliaceae (2854 accessions, 1145 spp.)
- Carnivorous plants
- Cycads
- Cyclanthaceae
- Mediterranean Geophytes
- Succulents of Madagascar (1501 accessions, 847 ssp.)
- Succulents of the New World (2342 accessions, 1695 spp.)
- Succulents of the Old World (3563 accessions, 2314 spp.)
- Tropical Ferns
- Tropical Orchids (4852 accessions, 3510 spp.)

The garden's outdoor sections contains plants from bogs and heath, an alpine garden, fern ravine and inland dune, weedy vineyard, and a systematic collection. The herbarium contains over 250,000 specimens representing more than 50,000 taxa.

== See also ==
- List of botanical gardens in Germany
