= University Hospital Heidelberg =

Geography
- Location: Neuenheimer Feld, Heidelberg, Germany
- Coordinates: 49°25′05″N 8°40′01″E

Organisation
- Type: Teaching
- Affiliated university: Universität Heidelberg

Services
- Beds: 1,991 (2020)

History
- Opened: 1388

Links
- Website: www.klinikum.uni-heidelberg.de
- Lists: Hospitals in Germany

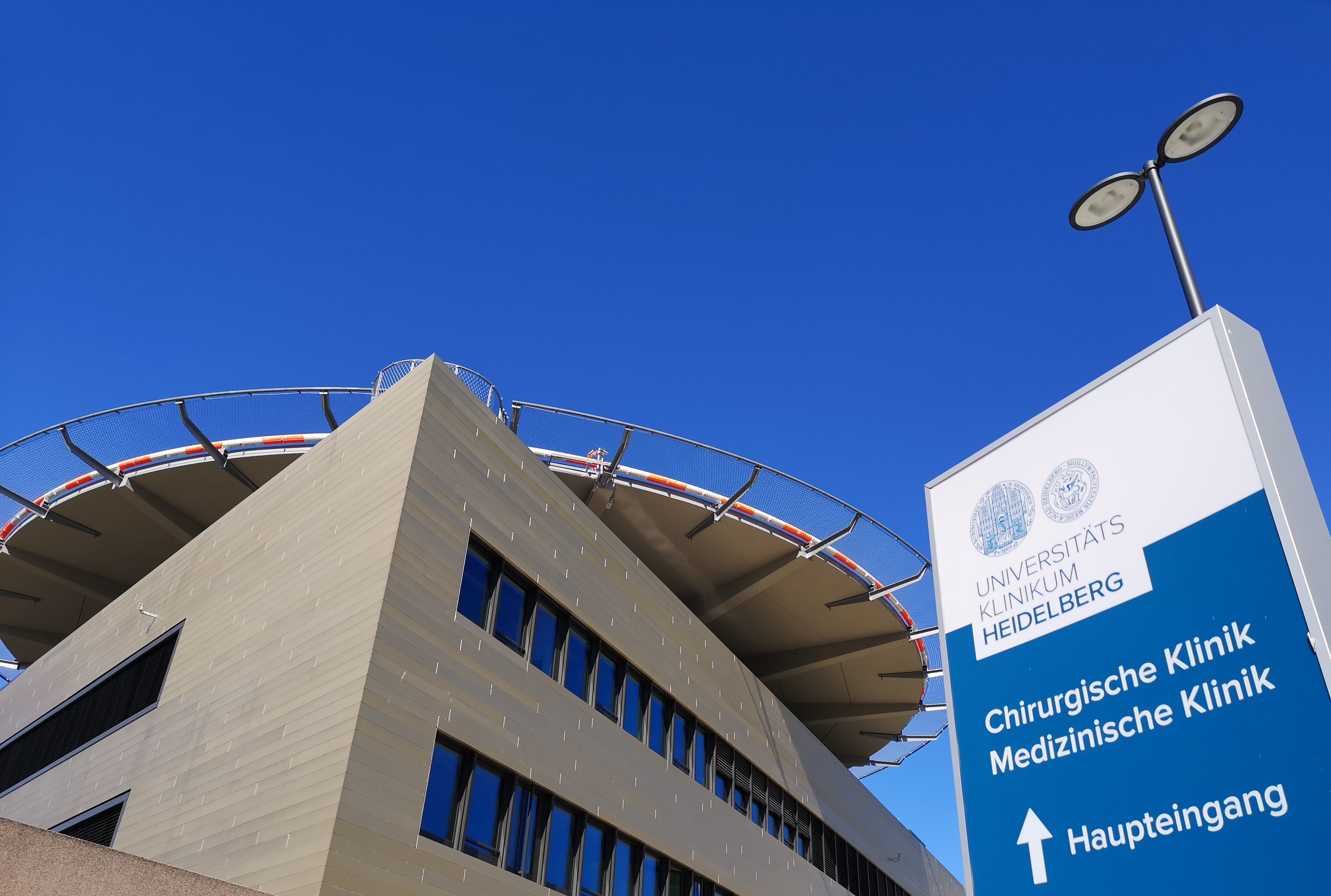
New Surgical Clinic

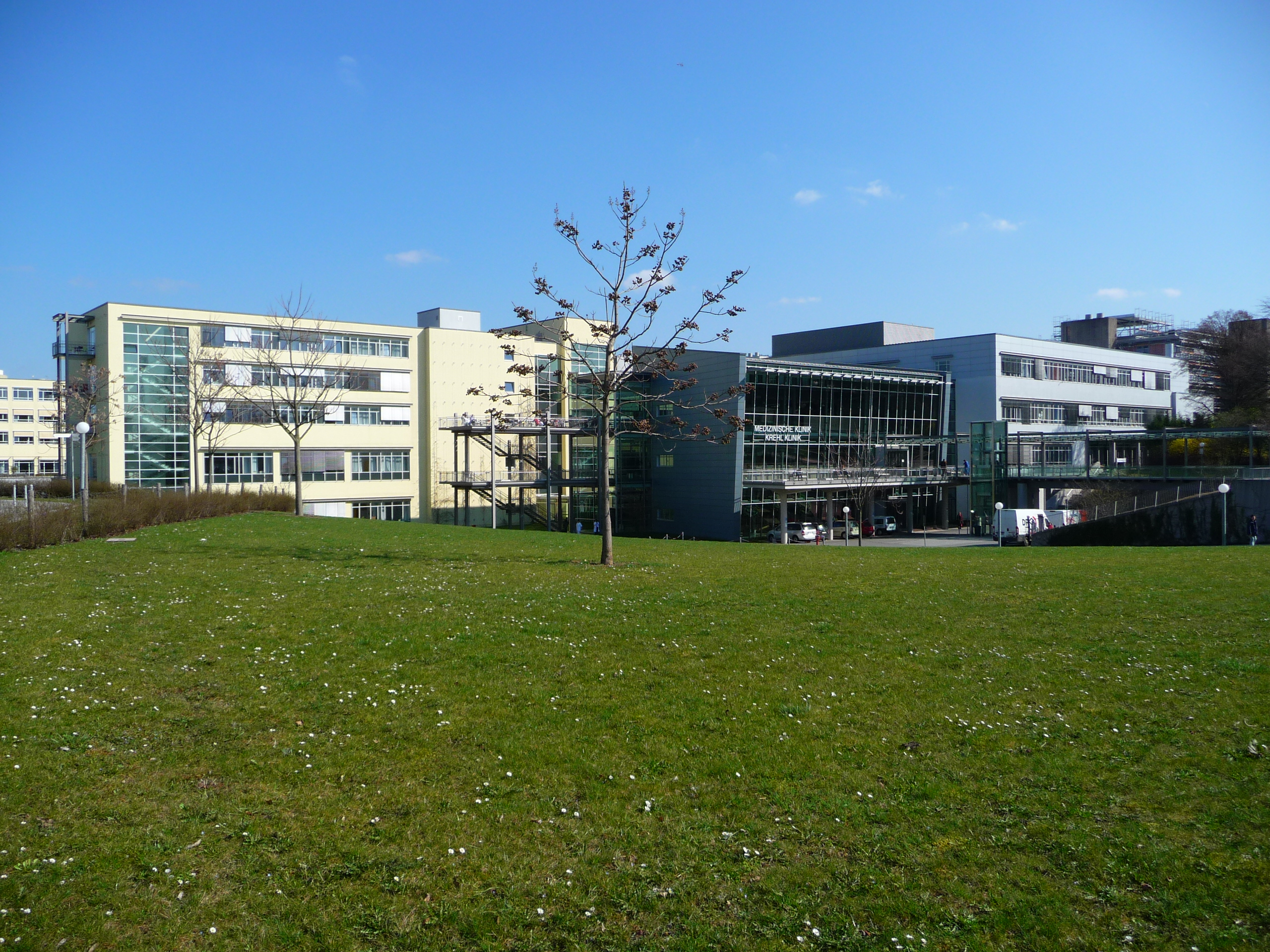
Hospital of Internal Medicine New Campus (University of Heidelberg) Heidelberg

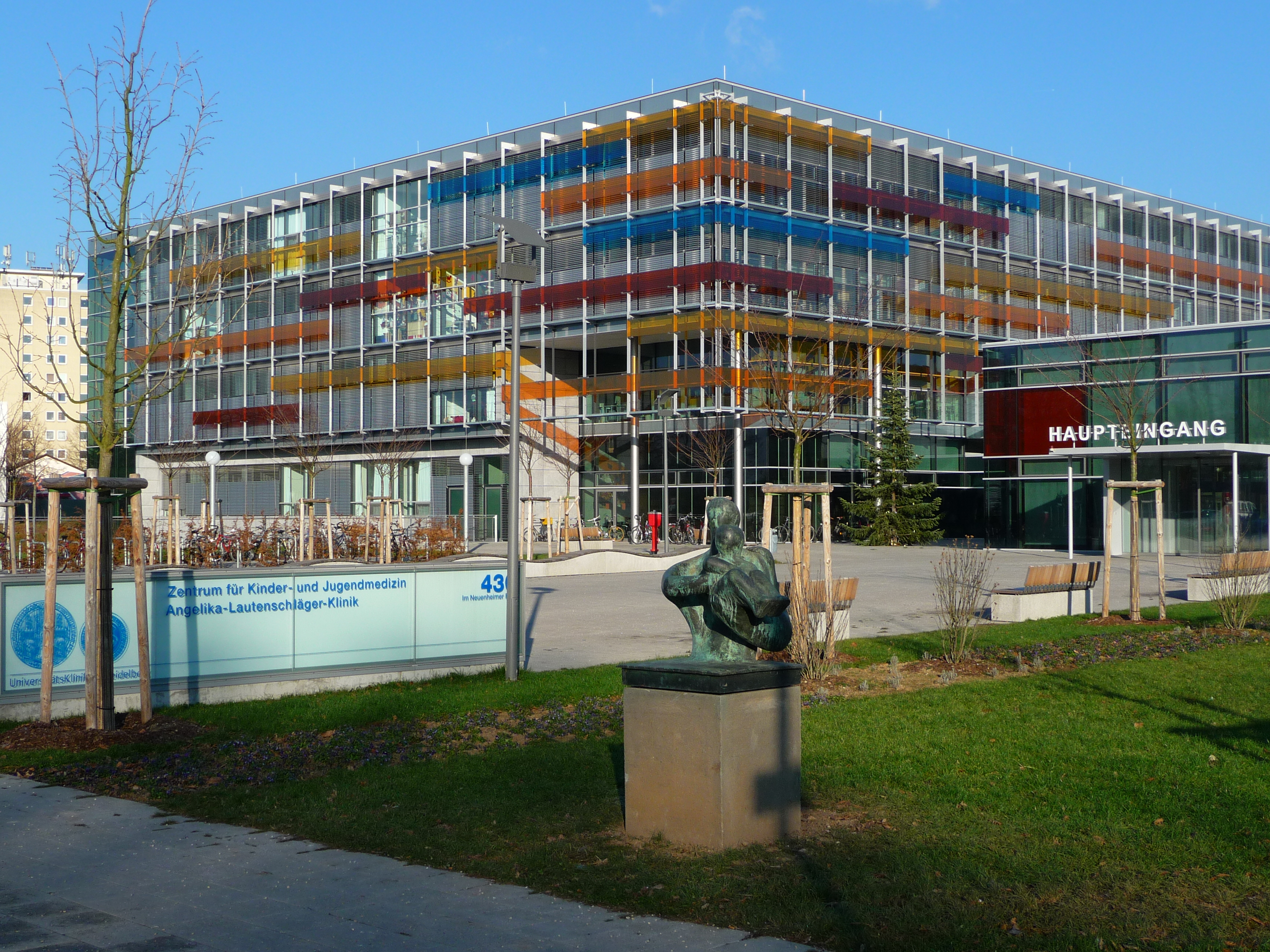
Children's Hospital

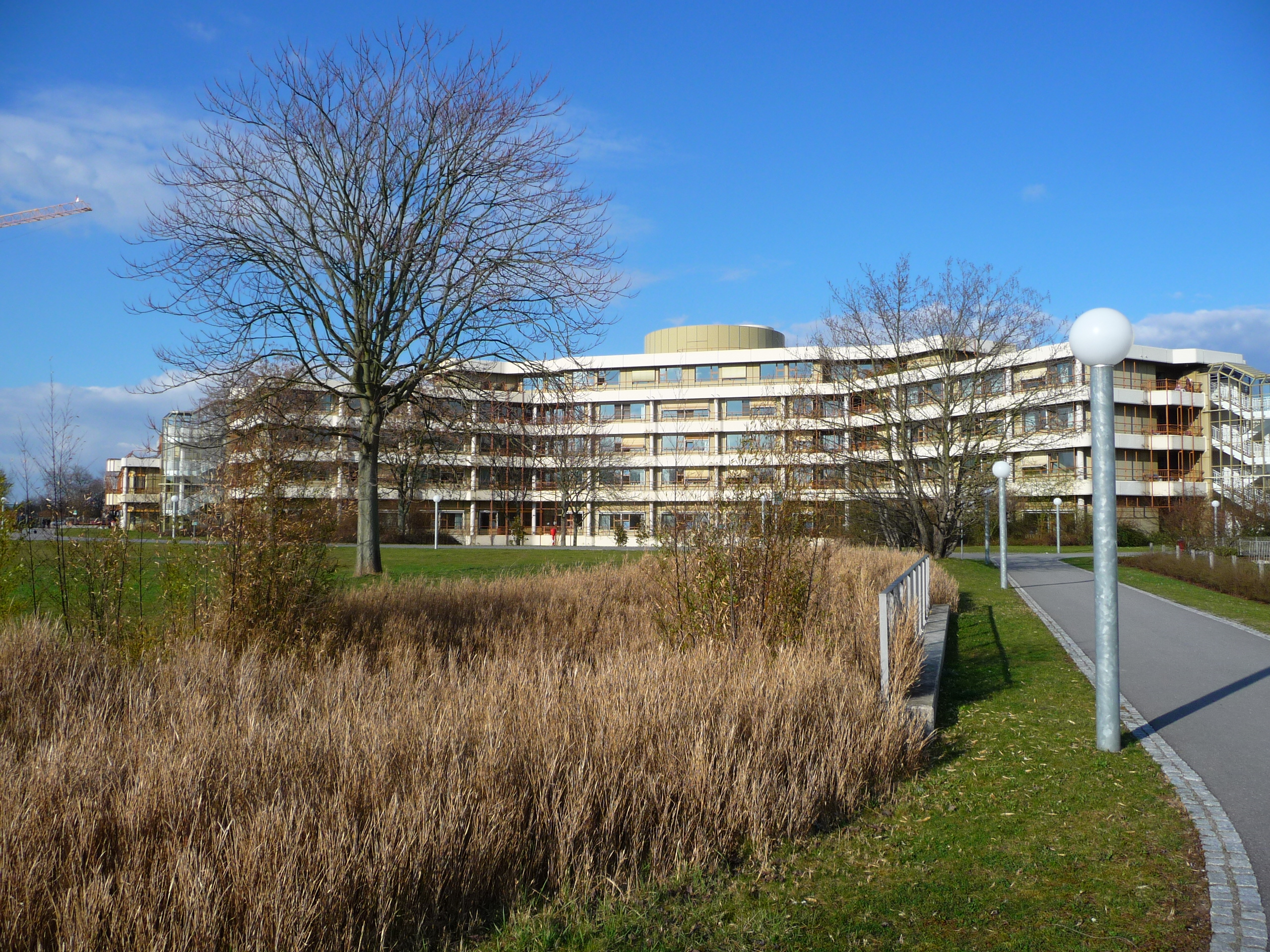
Center for Injuries and Disease in the Head/Neck Area

University Hospital Heidelberg (German: Universitätsklinikum Heidelberg, Abbr: UKHD or UKL-HD) is a university hospital in Heidelberg, Germany and one of the largest medical centers in the country. It is closely linked to Heidelberg University Medical School (Heidelberg University Faculty of Medicine), and its history dates back to 1388. The Heidelberg University Hospital was ranked the 12th-best hospital in the world by Newsweek as of 2026.

== Organization ==
UKHD is functionally an integral part of Heidelberg University's academic and research environment and serves as the primary teaching hospital for its clinical medicine program. However, it is administratively and financially distinct from Heidelberg University and operates as an independent public law institution ("Anstalt des öffentlichen Rechts") with its own Board of Directors.

UKHD is affiliated with the Medical Faculty of Heidelberg University, serving as its teaching hospital and core clinical partner for research, education, and patient care. Researchers working at UKHD are affiliated academically with Heidelberg University, as part of the Medical Faculty, which is reflected in the university's affiliation policies that apply to research outputs originating from UKHD. This connection enables UKHD to participate in joint research projects, clinical trials, and teaching programs with Heidelberg University, while maintaining legal, financial, and administrative independence.

== Patient care ==
Over 1 million patients per year are treated at the University Hospital Heidelberg. The hospital is especially renowned for the treatment of cancer. A recent innovation in the care of cancer patient is the foundation of the National Center of Tumor Diseases (NCT) in cooperation with German Cancer Research Center (DKFZ). The goal of NCT is an interdisciplinary collaboration between various clinical and basic science disciplines and the fast implementation of new and innovative therapeutic procedures. A good example for the Heidelberg's leading position in innovative cancer research and treatment is HIT (heavy ion therapy). HIT utilizes scanned beams of heavy ions, like carbon ions, and is thought to be superior in the treatment of some cancers compared to normal photon radiation. The new facility at University Hospital Heidelberg is unique in the world. The HIT radiation beam is directed by a 600 metric ton gantry which is rotated to focus the beam.

== Research ==
Close ties exist between it, the University Hospital and different research institutions in Heidelberg, e.g. German Cancer Research Center, Max Planck Institute for Medical Research and European Molecular Biology Laboratory.

== Medical education ==
Heidelberg University medical degree program, two years of basic science, followed by the first of the two steps of the German medical licensing examination, and four years of clinical studies, has undergone a fundamental reform in 2001: From 2001 on, all medical students at Heidelberg University, University Hospital Heidelberg (as opposed to the Heidelberg University Faculty of Medicine in Mannheim) pursue a reformed six-year-long course named "HeiCuMed" ("Heidelberger Curriculum Medicinale"). This degree course is an adapted version of the Harvard Medical School curriculum. Undergraduate, graduate and postgraduate programs of Heidelberg University Medical School have played a fundamental role in Heidelberg being awarded "University of Excellence" status by the German Universities Excellence Initiative. There are currently over 4000 students enrolled.

== Notable researchers and physicians affiliated with the Research Cluster Heidelberg in recent time ==
- Markus Büchler, surgeon, professor of surgery at Heidelberg University, renowned for pioneering works in surgery of pancreas,
- Hugo Katus, cardiologist, professor of medicine at Heidelberg University, developed the Troponin T test (biochemical detection of a myocardial infarction),
- Bert Sakmann (Nobel Prize in Physiology or Medicine, 1997), professor at Heidelberg University and an emeritus Scientific Member of the Max Planck Institute for Medical Research in Heidelberg,
- Harald zur Hausen (Nobel Prize in Physiology or Medicine, 2008), from 1983 until 2003 served as a chairman and member of the scientific advisory board of the German Cancer Research Center in Heidelberg and professor of medicine at Heidelberg University.

== Timeline ==
- 1386: Foundation of the Universität Heidelberg by Elector Palatine Ruprecht I.
- 1388: Heidelberg School of Medicine commences education.
- 1899: For the first time women are allowed to study medicine in Heidelberg.

== See also ==
- List of university hospitals
- Heidelberg University
