= History of Heidelberg =

Historical aspects of Heidelberg

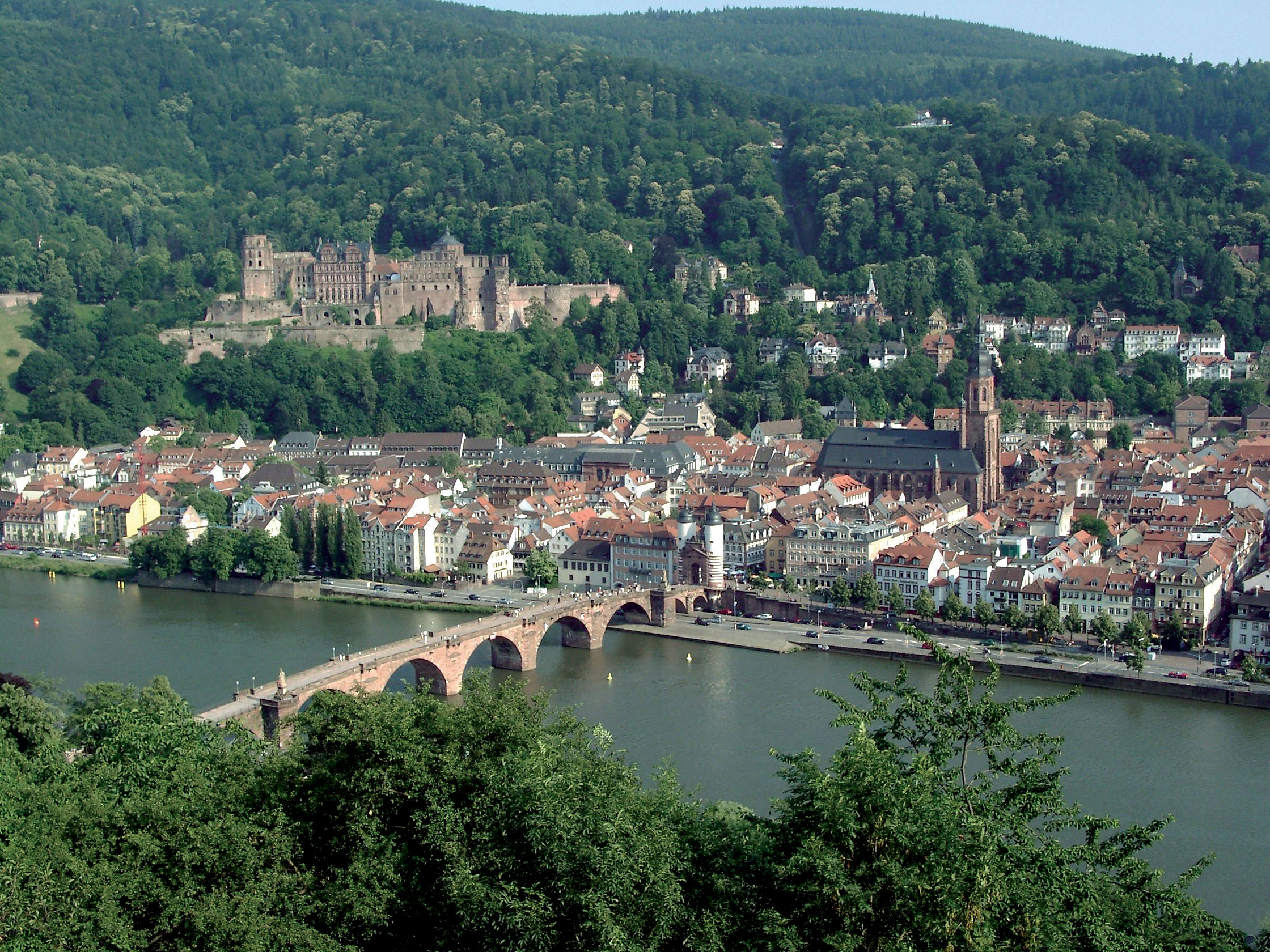
Heidelberg's old town was rebuilt in the 18th century on a medieval layout. The castle, once the residence of the Palatinate, is now a ruin.

The history of Heidelberg dates back to settlements in the Heidelberg area during the Celtic and Roman periods, long before the city was first mentioned in a document in 1196. In the 13th century, the castle was built, the city was laid out according to plan, and it became the residence of the Counts Palatine of the Rhine. This marked the beginning of about five hundred years of prosperity for the city on the Neckar as the capital of the Palatinate. The University of Heidelberg was founded in 1386 as the first university in what is now Germany. During the War of the Palatinate Succession, French troops destroyed the city in 1693, which was rebuilt on its medieval foundations in the Baroque style. In 1720, the electoral residence moved to Mannheim. In 1803, Heidelberg became part of Baden. In the 19th century, poets and thinkers worked in the city, earning Heidelberg the nickname "City of Romanticism". Heidelberg became a center of science and a tourist destination. In the 19th and 20th centuries, the city expanded through incorporations and construction projects and remained largely undamaged during the Second World War. After the war, Heidelberg was the headquarters of the U.S. Army in Europe until 2013.

== Before the city was founded ==
=== Prehistory ===
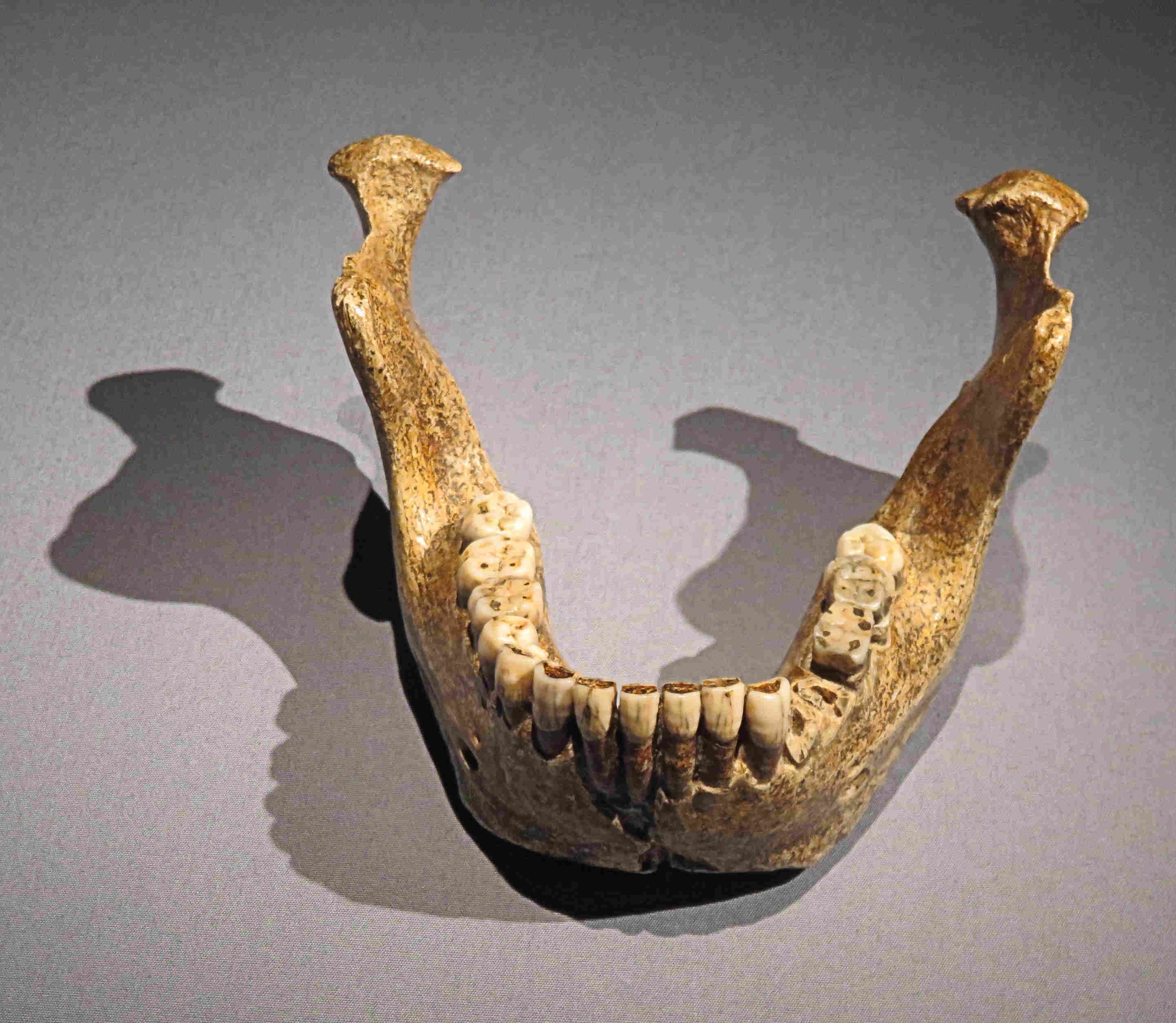
The lower jaw of Mauer, type specimen of the species Homo heidelbergensis (original)

The ancestor of Neanderthals, the fossil species Homo heidelbergensis, was named after its first scientific description in Heidelberg. The approximately 600,000-year-old lower jaw from Mauer, discovered in 1907 by laborer Daniel Hartmann in a sand pit in the village of Mauer, southeast of Heidelberg, is the type specimen of Homo heidelbergensis and the oldest fossil of the genus Homo found in Germany to date.

The first permanent settlement in the Heidelberg area dates to the Neolithic Age, based on archaeological finds from the 5th millennium BC, attributed to the Linear Pottery, Rössener, and Michelsberg cultures. A significant find from this period is a large pit, approximately 12 × 14 meters in diameter and 3.80 meters deep, used as a waste disposal site for a village of the Rössen culture (around 4500 BC). A multiple burial site with six individuals (three adults and three children) discovered in the Handschuhsheim district dates to the Michelsberg culture, around 3800 BC. The individuals were killed during a raid and buried together. These Stone Age settlement traces are concentrated in the districts to the north and west of the city center, where the Neckar emerges from the Odenwald and was located in the river's alluvial fan in prehistoric times. This provided fertile soil, which, together with the favorable climate and natural protection from the east provided by the Odenwald, created very favorable conditions for settlement.

During the Bronze Age, members of the tumulus and urnfield cultures inhabited the Heidelberg area and appear to have established a settlement that was very dense by prehistoric standards in parts of the city.

=== Celtic period ===
In the 5th and 4th centuries BC, Heiligenberg, located above Heidelberg, developed into an important settlement center for the Celts, who built a large, fortified settlement there. Its double ring wall can still be seen today. Finds show that the site was the cultural and religious center of the region and that iron was mined and processed there on a large scale. However, in the 3rd century, the hilltop settlement was abandoned for reasons that are not entirely clear. It may have lost its function as a central location to a place further down the Rhine valley, which was easier to reach by transport. However, archaeological finds indicate that Heiligenberg continued to be visited by the local population in the centuries that followed. Parallel to the settlement activities on the mountain, various structures were also built in the rest of Heidelberg during the Celtic period. Their traces are spread relatively evenly on both sides of the Neckar River across various districts of the city, but the fragmentary findings do not allow for a more precise reconstruction of the structure and significance of these presumably small farming settlements. Also found near the river is the fragment of the head of a larger-than-life stone sculpture, discovered in a Roman burial ground in the Bergheim district, thought to have belonged to the tomb of a powerful resident of Heidelberg (a so-called "princely tomb").

In the 1st century BC, however, Celtic settlement came to a complete halt, as it did in many places in the wider area. This phenomenon is often linked to reports from later ancient sources, according to which the Celtic tribe of the Helvetians left their ancestral settlements between the Rhine, Main, and Black Forest under pressure from the advancing Germanic Suebi and moved to Gaul.

=== Roman rule ===
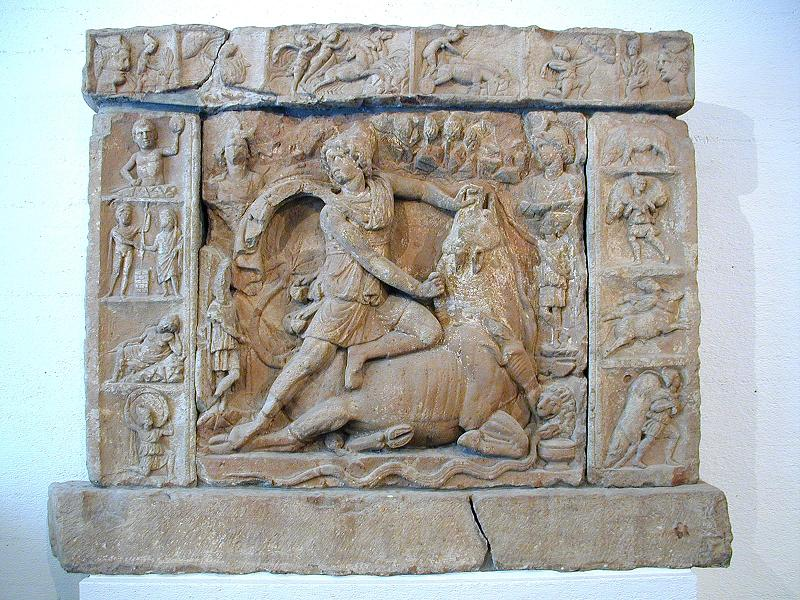
Relief depicting the killing of a bull from a Mithraeum in Heidelberg-Neuenheim, 2nd century

During the reign of Emperor Tiberius (14–37 AD), the Romans settled allied Germanic tribes from the Neckarsueben tribe in the area east of the Neckar estuary to create a buffer zone between the Rhine, the outer border of the Roman Empire, and Germania. Under Emperor Vespasian (69–79), the Romans pushed their border into the area on the right bank of the Rhine and established a military camp in what is now the Heidelberg city area. In 90 AD, a stone fort was built to replace the previous wooden structures. The Romans first built a wooden bridge over the Neckar River, then a 260-meter-long stone pier bridge around 200 AD. A temple to Mercury was built on the summit of the Heiligenberg, and the cult of Mithras was also widespread in Heidelberg. During Roman times, the main town in the region was neighboring Lopodunum (now Ladenburg), but a thriving pottery center also developed around the military camp in Heidelberg (whose Latin name is unknown).

In the 3rd century, the Romans were driven out by the Alamanni. From 233 onwards, this Germanic tribe broke through the Limes and invaded Roman territory. Raids and pillaging also became more frequent in the Heidelberg area. After 260, the Romans were forced to retreat to the Rhine, and the Alamanni eventually settled in the Roman borderlands in what is now southwestern Germany.

=== The Frankish Empire and Christianisation ===
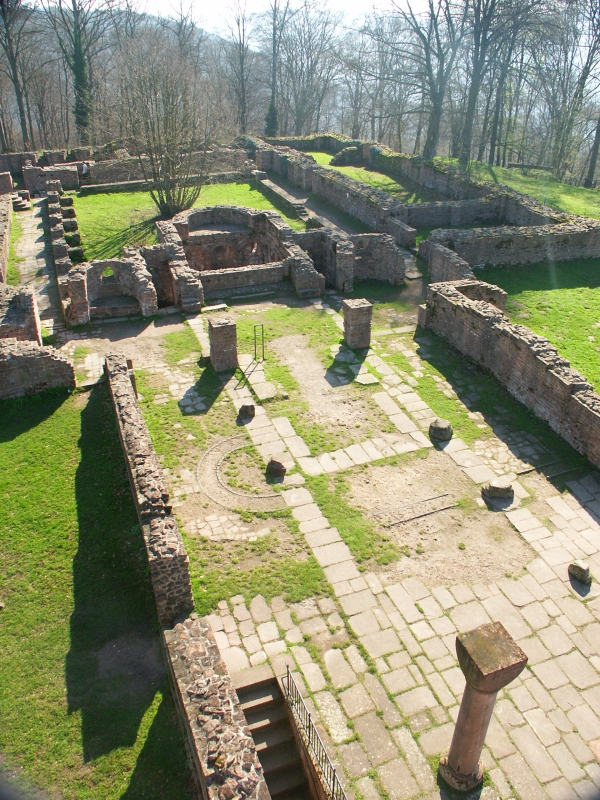
Ruins of St. Michael's Monastery on Heiligenberg

Little is known about the history of Heidelberg in the centuries that followed. However, following the victory of the Merovingian king Clovis I over the Alamanni in 506, Heidelberg eventually became part of the Frankish Empire and belonged to the Lobdengau. The most visible consequence of the new rule was the Christianisation of the area. In the 8th century, the nearby Lorsch Abbey developed into an important political center, which competed with the Diocese of Worms for supremacy in the region. To consolidate his influence in the Heidelberg area, the abbot of Lorsch, Thiotroch, founded the Michaelskloster monastery as a branch monastery on the Heiligenberg in 870 on the site of the old temple of Mercury. Two centuries later, another branch monastery, the Stephanskloster, was built on the Michelsberg, the foothill of the Heiligenberg. In 1130, the Stift Neuburg was built at the foot of the mountain.

Many of Heidelberg's villages were founded during the Frankish period in the 6th century. They were first mentioned in documents in the 8th century in the Lorsch Codex – Neuenheim and Handschuhsheim in 765, Rohrbach in 766, Wieblingen and Kirchheim in 767, and Bergheim in 769. This means that the districts of Heidelberg that date back to these villages are several centuries older than the city itself.

== Heidelberg in the Middle Ages ==
=== The beginnings of Heidelberg ===
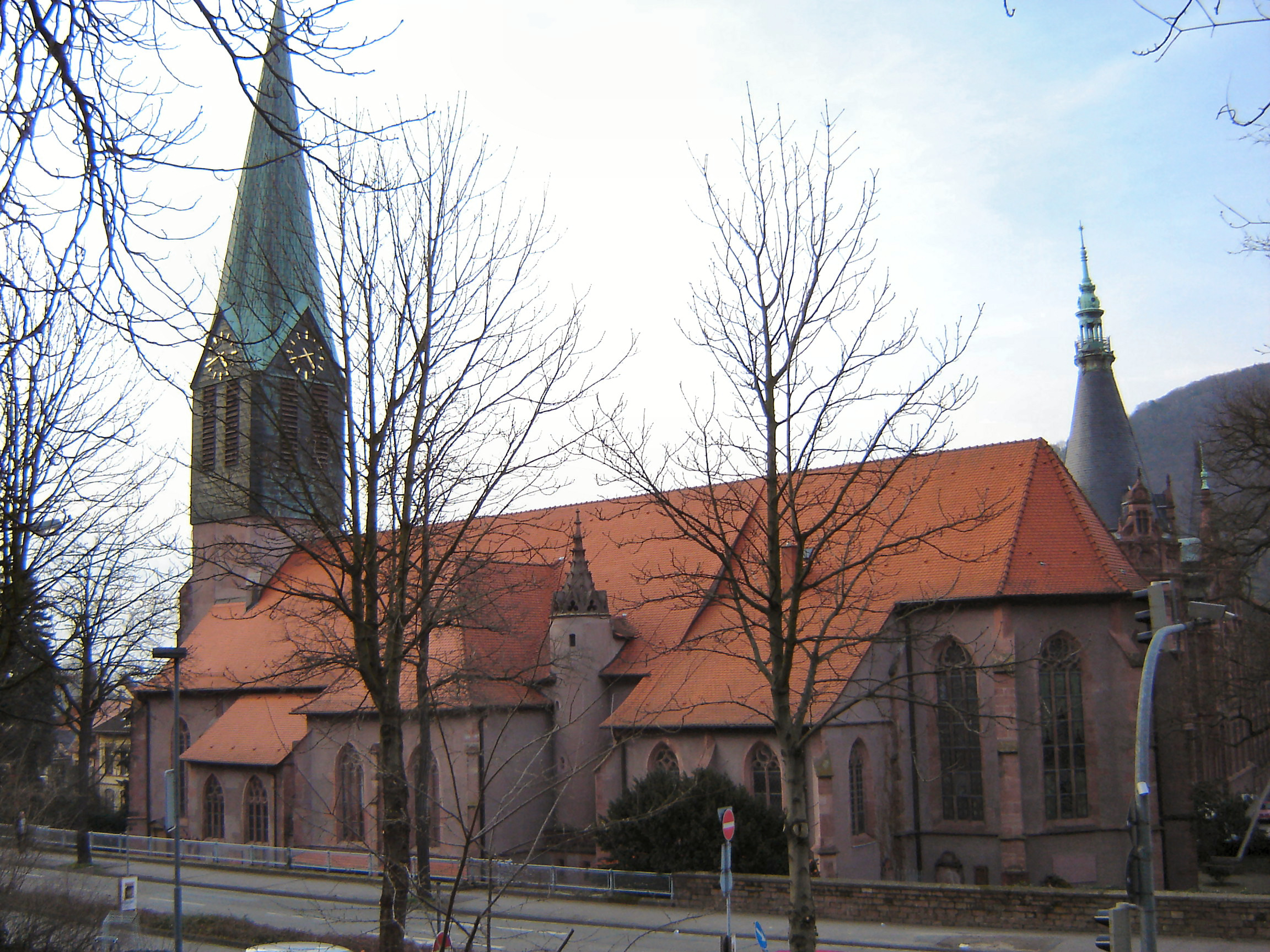
St. Peter's Church is the oldest church in Heidelberg's old town.

The name Heidelberch was first mentioned in a document from the Schönau monastery in 1196. At that time, the site was still owned by the diocese of Worms. However, a castle on the northern slope of the Königstuhl had probably already been built at the end of the 11th or beginning of the 12th century. It is unclear whether this first castle was a predecessor of today's Heidelberg Castle on the Jettenbühl or whether it was located on the Molkenkur at a higher point on the mountainside, with the predecessor of the castle not built until the 13th century. What is certain, however, is that today's castle has little in common with the first phase of construction due to numerous alterations and extensions.

The name Heidelberg (also Heydelberg) originally referred to the castle and was later transferred to the city, although the etymology is not entirely clear. The "berg" in the name probably refers to the Königstuhl. The first part could be derived from the landscape term "Heide", which means "free land" in the sense of uninhabited communal land. The modern use of "Heide" to mean an unwooded area can also be justified, as the earliest depictions of the Königstuhl show its peak as unwooded. However, it is less likely that Heidelberg is derived from "Heidenberg" and refers to Celtic and Roman worship on the Heiligenberg. The derivation from the Old High German personal name Heidilo has also been rejected.

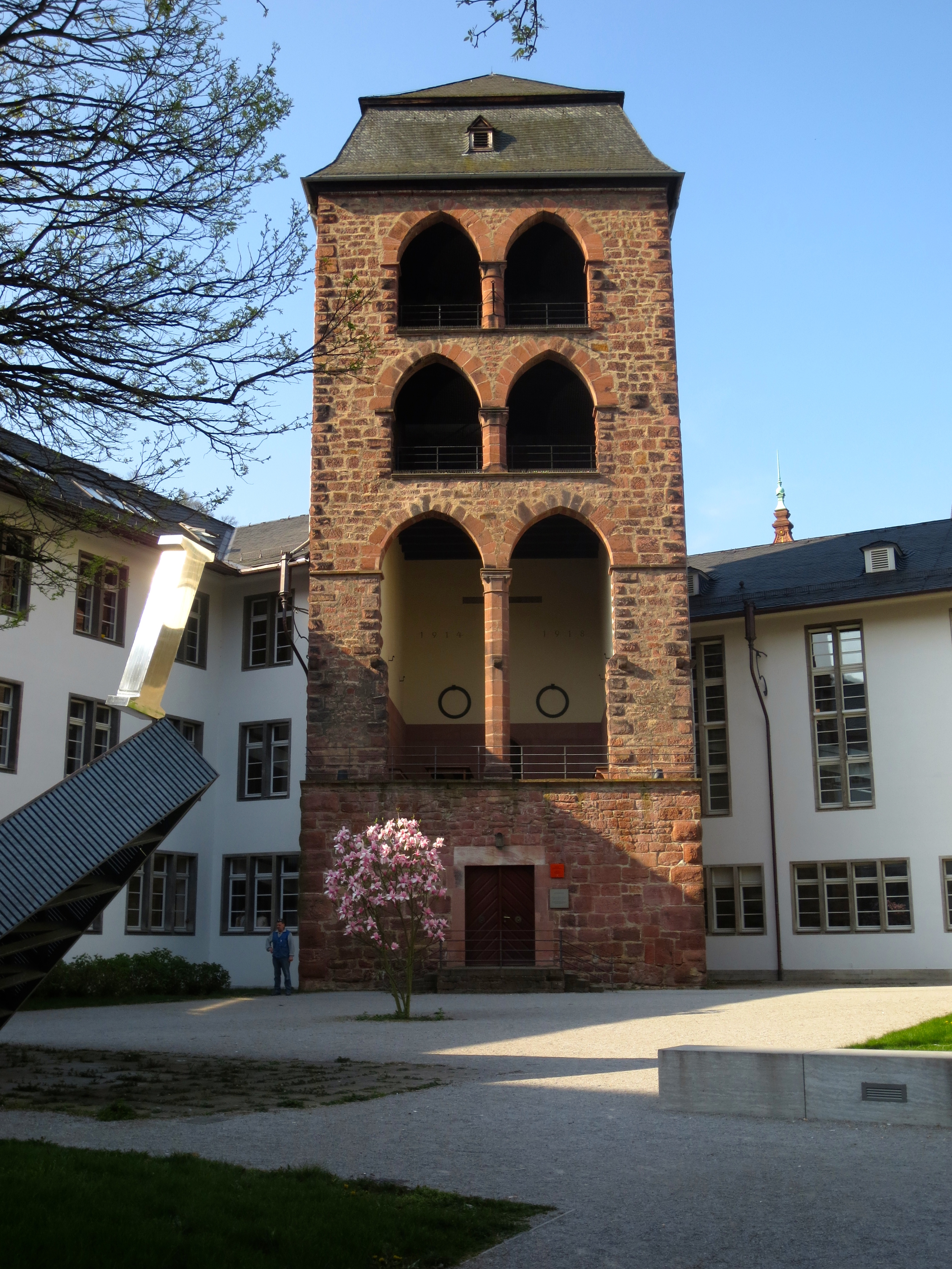
The Witches' Tower in the courtyard of the New University is the only remnant of the medieval city wall.

The city of Heidelberg was planned and built later in the area between Königstuhl and the Neckar. While it was long assumed that Heidelberg was founded between 1170 and 1180, more recent findings suggest that the city was not founded until around 1220. The rectangular layout with three streets running parallel to the river and connecting cross streets, as well as the market square in the center, has been preserved to this day. This town plan covered the eastern part of today's old town, known as the core old town, up to the Grabengasse. It was surrounded by a city wall, of which only the so-called Hexenturm (Witches' Tower) in the courtyard of the New University remains. A bridge over the Neckar is first mentioned in 1284. Although it was to remain Heidelberg's main church for a long time, St. Peter's Church and the surrounding old castle district, later called Bergstadt, lay outside the city limits until the 18th century.

=== Ascension to the capital of the Electoral Palatinate ===
In 1156, Emperor Frederick I Barbarossa appointed his half-brother Conrad the Staufer as Count Palatine of the Rhine. Counts Palatine already existed in Frankish times, originally as senior royal officials at court with mainly administrative and judicial duties. Under Konrad, the northern Upper Rhine region became the center of the Palatinate, which over time developed into a larger territorial state within the Holy Roman Empire. After a brief reign by the Welf dynasty, the office passed to the Wittelsbach dynasty in 1214. In 1225, the Count Palatine of the Rhine received Heidelberg, formerly part of Worms, as a fiefdom.

At the beginning of their reign, the Palatine Counts did not have a permanent residence but stayed at various locations within their territory. However, Heidelberg had already developed the character of a royal seat under Louis II (1253–1294). When the traditional practice of traveling between residences was abandoned in the 14th century, Heidelberg became the permanent residence.

In the House Treaty of Pavia in 1329, the Wittelsbach territory was divided between a Palatinate and a Bavarian line. According to the treaty, the electoral dignity, the right to elect the Roman German king, was to alternate between the two lines. However, in the Golden Bull of 1356, only the Counts Palatine of the Rhine were granted the right to elect the emperor. From then on, they were known as the Electors Palatine and were among the most influential German rulers. In the following period, their territory came to be known as the Electorate Palatinate.

=== University foundation ===
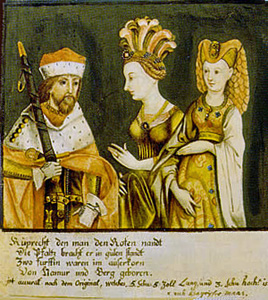
Elector Ruprecht I of the Palatinate with his two wives, Elisabeth of Namur and Beatrix of Berg

In 1386, Elector Ruprecht I founded the University of Heidelberg. After the universities of Prague (founded in 1348) and Vienna (1365), it was only the third university in the Holy Roman Empire and is the oldest of the universities in what is now the Federal Republic of Germany. The founding of the university increased Heidelberg's importance and contributed to establishing it as the capital of the Electoral Palatinate. Ruprecht's political ambitions may have played a role in his motivation to found the university, as he gained considerable reputation for Heidelberg and the Electoral Palatinate by promoting science, while training the clergy, doctors, lawyers, and teachers needed to administer his territory. Another important reason was that, after the Great Western Schism, German academics could no longer study at the Sorbonne in Paris, the leading European university of the Middle Ages, because Germany supported Pope Urban VI in Rome, while France supported the Avignon antipope Clement VII.

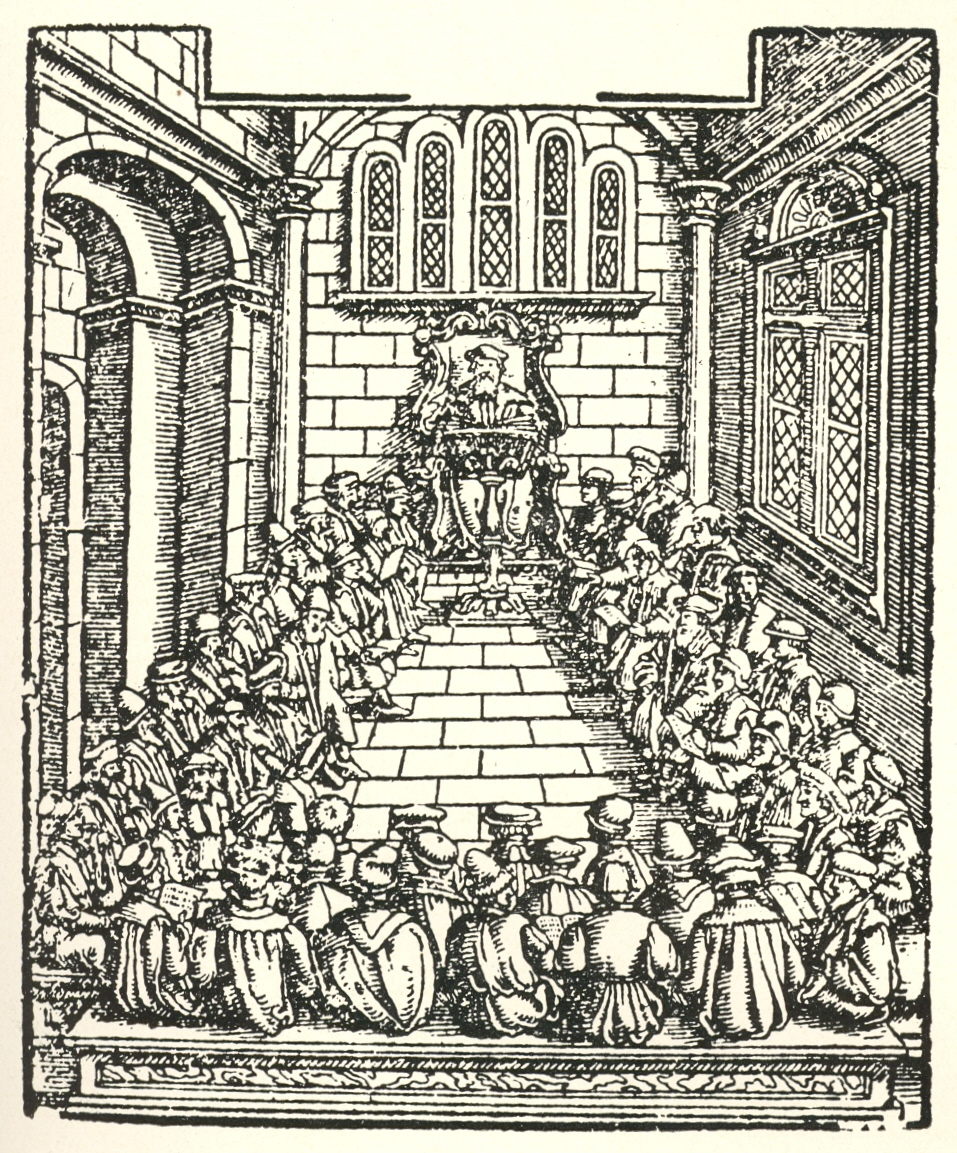
High School in Heidelberg. Woodcut from the Cosmographia by Sebastian Münster, 1544.

Although the city on the Neckar River was remarkably small for a university town at the time of the university's founding, with a population of just 5,000, and had no academic tradition, and although it faced competition from other universities founded in the following years, such as in Cologne (1388), Heidelberg's "Hohe Schule" (high school) established itself as a medium-sized university. The university had its own jurisdiction, and its members enjoyed numerous privileges. During the 15th century, there were several violent clashes between the townspeople and the university students. However, Heidelberg did not experience the kind of class warfare common in the large imperial cities.

=== Urban expansion and subsequent development ===
Under Elector Ruprecht II, Heidelberg underwent extensive expansion in 1392. The western city limits were pushed forward to the level of today's Bismarckplatz, doubling the area of Heidelberg. The inhabitants of the village of Bergheim were forcibly resettled in the newly created suburb. The city limits now extended to what is today the old town and remained unchanged until the 19th century. However, the suburbs remained sparsely built up for a long time. At the same time as the city was expanded, the Jewish community that had lived in Heidelberg since the 13th century was expelled. Their synagogue was converted into a chapel dedicated to the Virgin Mary, which also served as an auditorium for the university.

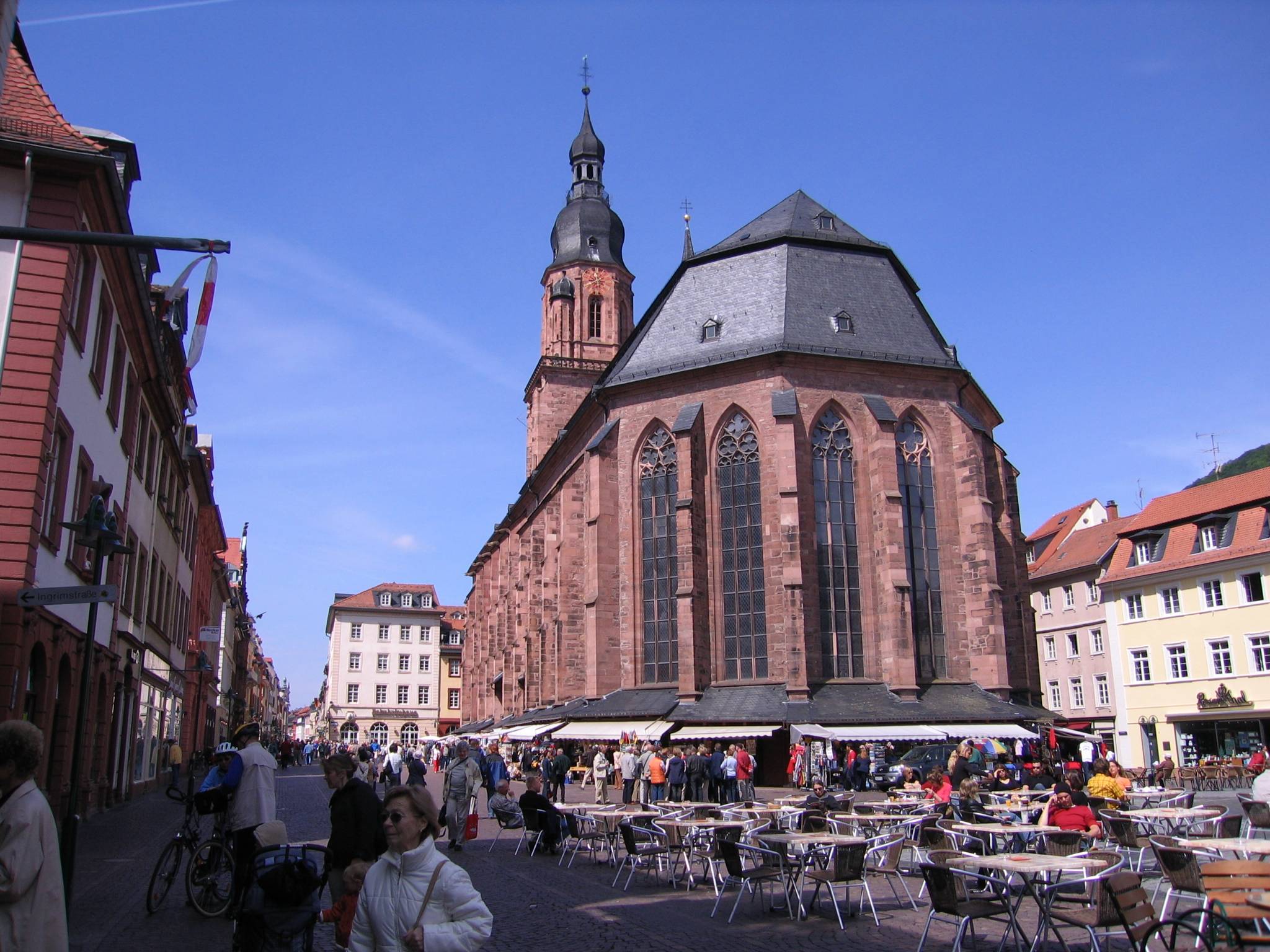
The Holy Spirit Church is the most visible legacy of the reign of Ruprecht III.

In 1400, Elector Ruprecht III was elected Roman German King, the first and only Elector of the Palatinate to hold this title. Although Ruprecht's imperial politics were not always successful, his residence city of Heidelberg benefited greatly from his royal status. The Ruprechtsbau, the oldest surviving part of Heidelberg Castle, was built during his reign. Ruprecht also had the chapel on the market square expanded into the prestigious Heiliggeistkirche (Church of the Holy Spirit). The Heiliggeistkirche replaced St. Peter's Church as the parish church and became the burial place of the Palatinate electors. Ruprecht's successor, Louis III, bequeathed his private library to the Heilig-Geist-Stift, thus laying the foundation for the famous Bibliotheca Palatina, which was kept in the galleries of the church.

Elector Frederick I (1451–1476), popularly known as "Pfälzer Fritz" (Fritz of the Palatinate), expanded the territory of the Electoral Palatinate in several successful military campaigns, earning him the nickname "the Victorious", and implemented reforms at the University of Heidelberg. Under him and his successor, Philip (1476–1508), the university became a stronghold of Renaissance humanism, attracting scholars such as Peter Luder, Johann XX von Dalberg, and Rudolf Agricola. Although Luder soon left Heidelberg, his inaugural lecture on the Studia humanitatis in 1456 is considered the starting point of humanism in Germany.

Despite its court nobility and academics, Heidelberg remained a predominantly agricultural farming town during the Middle Ages. The citizenry was organized into ten guilds, of which the winegrowers' guild was the largest.

== Reformation and wars ==
=== Lutheranism and Calvinism ===
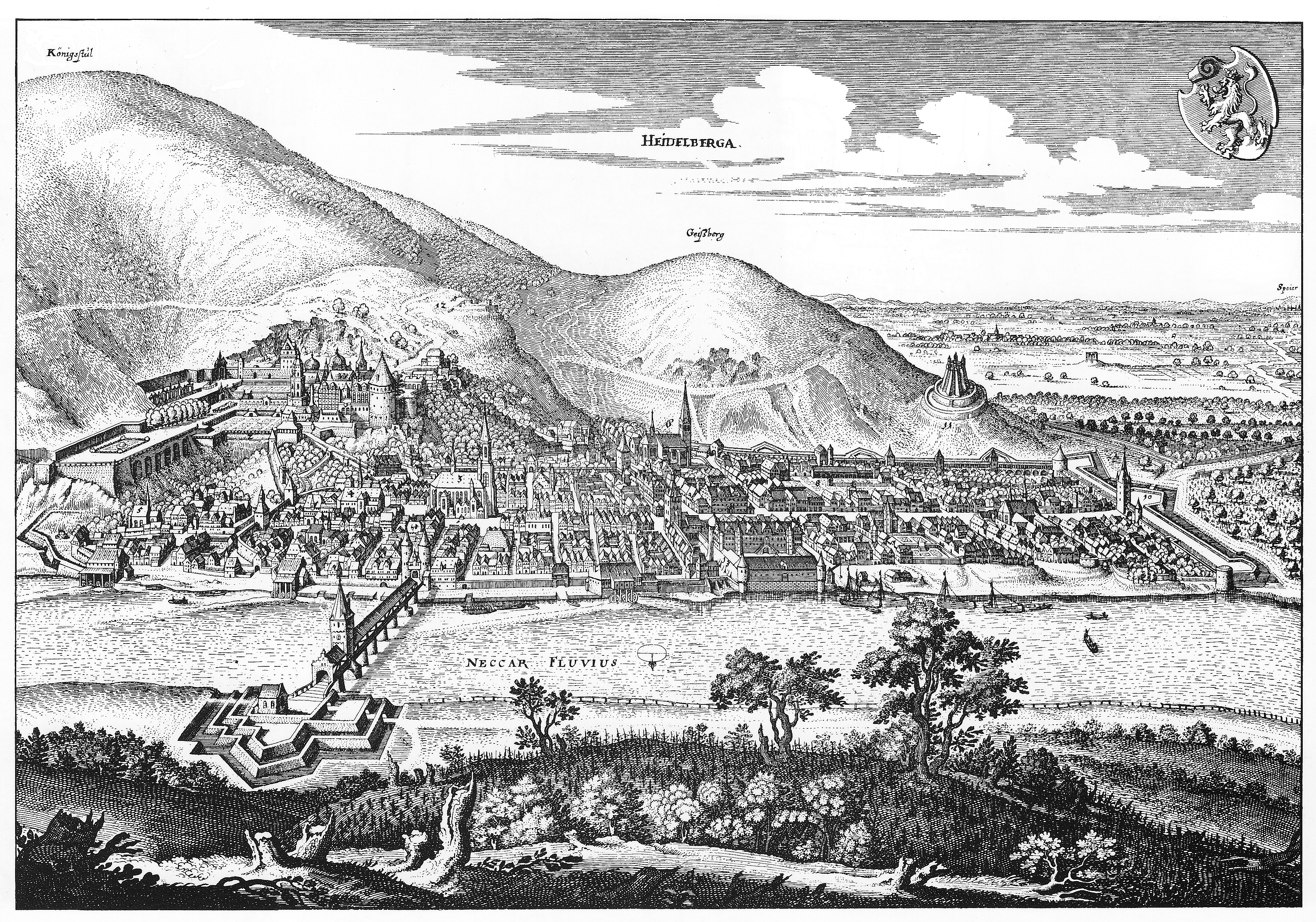
Large city view of Heidelberg in 1645 (copperplate engraving by Matthäus Merian)

Martin Luther's appearance at the Heidelberg Disputation in 1518 helped spread the ideas of the Reformation throughout Germany. Luther's ideas also spread to the Electoral Palatinate court. However, the Electoral Palatinate did not actively participate in the Reformation, even though the Palatinate electors at least tolerated the reformatory movement in the first half of the 16th century. Elector Frederick II (1544–1556) temporarily adopted reformatory policies but was forced to return to Catholicism under pressure from the emperor. It was not until under Elector Ottheinrich (1556–1559) that the Electoral Palatinate finally became Lutheran. Ottheinrich freed Heidelberg University from the influence of the Catholic Church and combined the book collections of the university, the collegiate library in the Heiliggeistkirche, and the palace library of the electors to form the Bibliotheca Palatina. He also continued the conversion of the electoral residence from a rather austere castle into a magnificent palace, which had been begun by his predecessors, with the construction of the Ottheinrich Building, the first Renaissance building in Germany.

After the introduction of Lutheranism by Ottheinrich, the Electoral Palatinate changed its denomination seven times until the 18th century, in accordance with the principle of cuius regio, eius religio ("whose rule, whose religion"). Ottheinrich's successor, Frederick III (1559–1576), converted to Calvinism. He turned the Electoral Palatinate into a strictly Calvinist state, where a strict ban on images prevailed in churches and swearing was punishable by law. Heidelberg's importance as a stronghold of the Reformed faith is evident in the Heidelberg Catechism, written in 1563, which remains a guiding document of Calvinist belief to this day. Under the next Elector, Ludwig VI (1576–1583), Heidelberg temporarily returned to Lutheran Protestantism before the administrator Johann Casimir (1583–1592) reintroduced Calvinism. With each change, the university was purged of professors who were not to the liking of the new rulers. Frederick IV (1592–1610) built the Friedrichsbau, named after him, on Heidelberg Castle.

=== Thirty Years' War ===
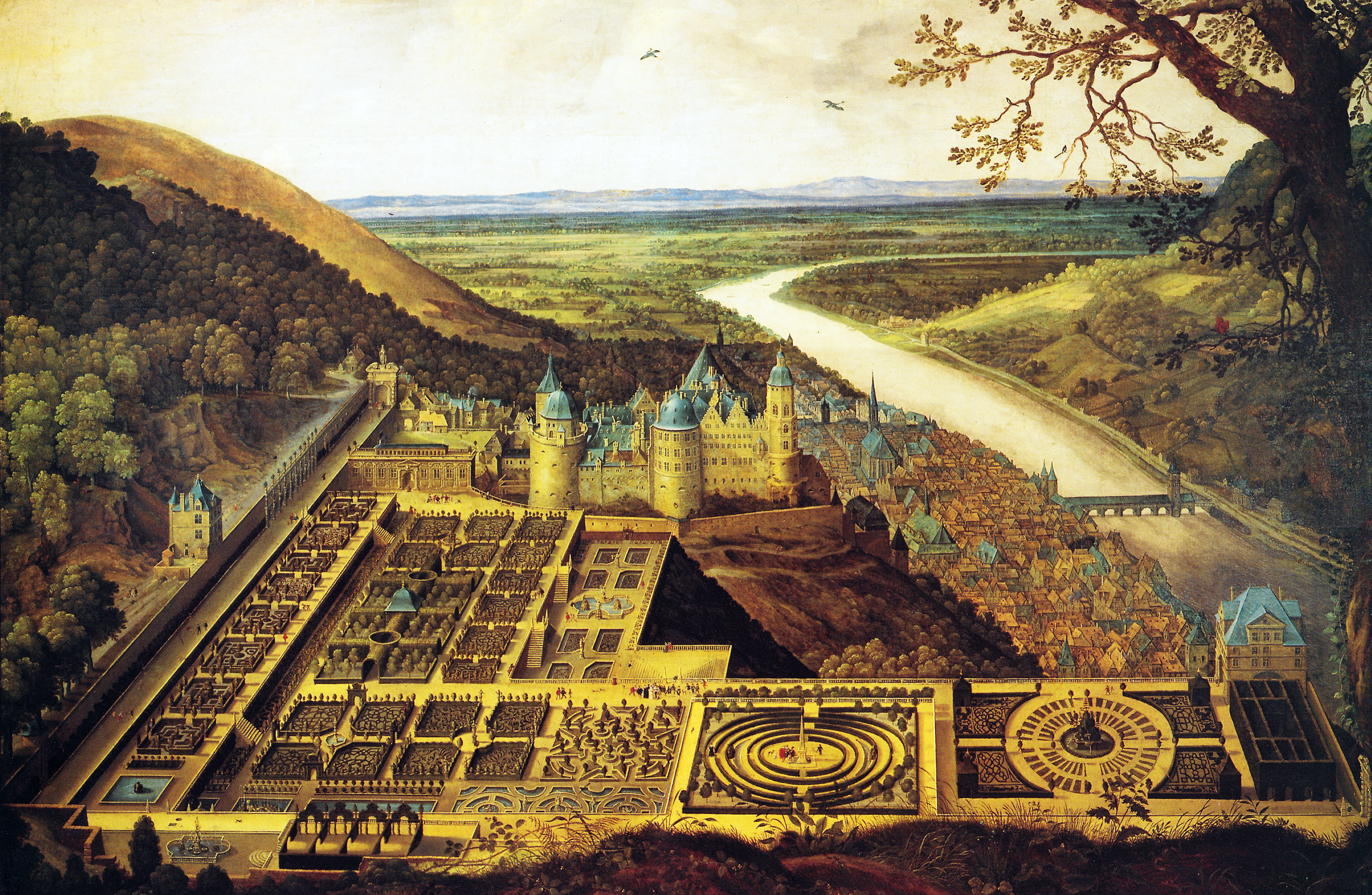
The Hortus Palatinus and Heidelberg Castle before its destruction, in an oil painting by Jacques Fouquières

Under the rule of Elector Frederick V (1610–1623), Heidelberg initially experienced a period of courtly splendor. To provide his wife, the English princess Elizabeth Stuart, with a court life befitting her status, Frederick had Heidelberg Castle redesigned. The first steps were the completion of the early Baroque English Building and the Elisabeth Gate in the Stückgarten. Shortly afterwards, work began on the famous Hortus Palatinus, a magnificent palace garden modeled on French and Italian designs, but it was never completed.

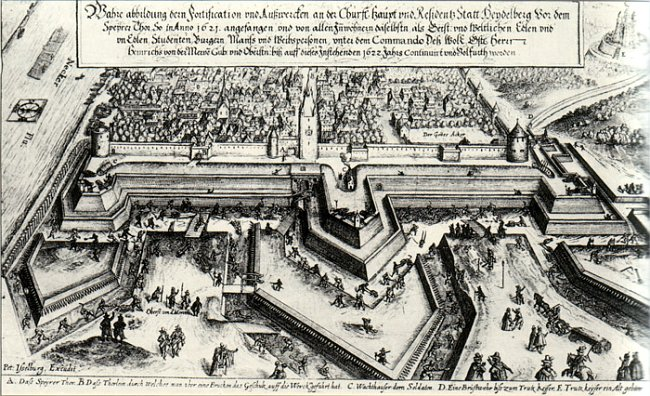
The fortifications at the Speyer Gate according to a copperplate engraving from 1622, reproduction

However, Frederick's reign ended in political disaster. As leader of the Protestant Union, he attempted to make the Electoral Palatinate the dominant Protestant power in the Holy Roman Empire. After the Defenestration of Prague, which triggered the Thirty Years' War in 1618, the Bohemian estates deposed the Catholic Ferdinand II and elected Frederick as King of Bohemia on 26 August 1619. Frederick hesitated to accept the crown because he feared he would not be able to prevail militarily against the Habsburgs. In fact, he was only able to maintain his rule for thirteen months and thus went down in history under the derisive nickname "Winter King". On 8 November 1620, he was defeated in the Battle of White Mountain by the troops of the Emperor and the Catholic League and was forced to flee into exile in the Netherlands. The emperor stripped Frederick V of his electoral title and transferred it to Duke Maximilian of Bavaria.

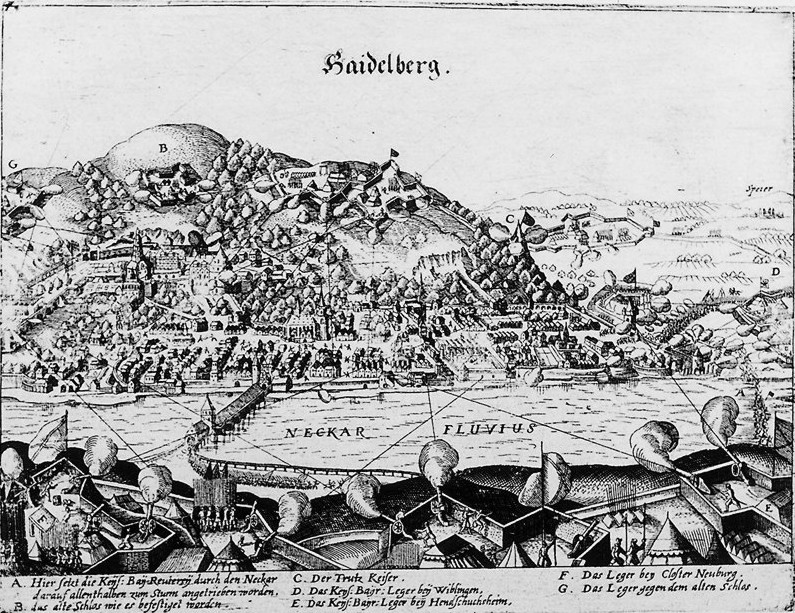
Capture of Heidelberg by Tilly's troops on 19 September 1622

In the summer of 1621, the army of General Tilly, supported by Spanish troops, set out to conquer the Electorate of the Palatinate. After a siege lasting almost three months, traces of which can still be found today, Heidelberg was conquered on 19 September 1622. The Electoral Palatinate on the right bank of the Rhine fell under Bavarian occupation, while the left bank became Spanish. During the occupation, Catholicism was imposed, and the university was dissolved. The Bibliotheca Palatina was transported to Rome at Maximilian's behest and presented to Pope Gregory XV. It is still kept in the Vatican Library today. In 1630, the Swedes entered the war and conquered most of the Electoral Palatinate by the end of 1632, which the exiled Elector Frederick learned shortly before his death in Mainz in November of that year. The Swedes did not conquer Heidelberg itself until May 1633, making it Protestant again for a short time. The Swedes appointed Ludwig Philipp, the brother of the deceased Elector, as administrator. However, after the Battle of Nördlingen in September 1634, Swedish rule in southern Germany collapsed once again. The troops of the Catholic League soon recaptured Heidelberg and besieged the castle in December 1634, when French troops under Marshal de la Force forced them to withdraw without a fight, on the pretext that they were not fighting the League, but only the League commander Charles of Lorraine as a renegade vassal of their king. Imperial and Bavarian troops finally recaptured the city and castle in July 1635, with the Bavarian troops remaining in the city until autumn 1649.

In the Peace of Westphalia, which ended the Thirty Years' War in 1648, Frederick's son Charles I Louis received the reduced Palatinate and the revoked, newly created eighth electoral title. However, the rulers of the Electoral Palatinate had lost much of their former political influence, as they now ranked last among the electors and had to relinquish the office of Arch-Truchsess. After Karl Ludwig, who had grown up in exile in England, moved to Heidelberg in October 1649, he initiated the reconstruction of the city, which had been devastated by the war, and settled immigrants from reformed areas, including Switzerland. Karl Ludwig advocated religious tolerance and recognized Lutheranism and Calvinism as equal denominations. In 1652, the university, which had been dissolved during the Bavarian occupation, was reopened. The appointment of the jurist Samuel von Pufendorf brought renown to the university, although attempts to recruit Baruch de Spinoza to Heidelberg University were unsuccessful.

=== War of the Palatinate Succession ===
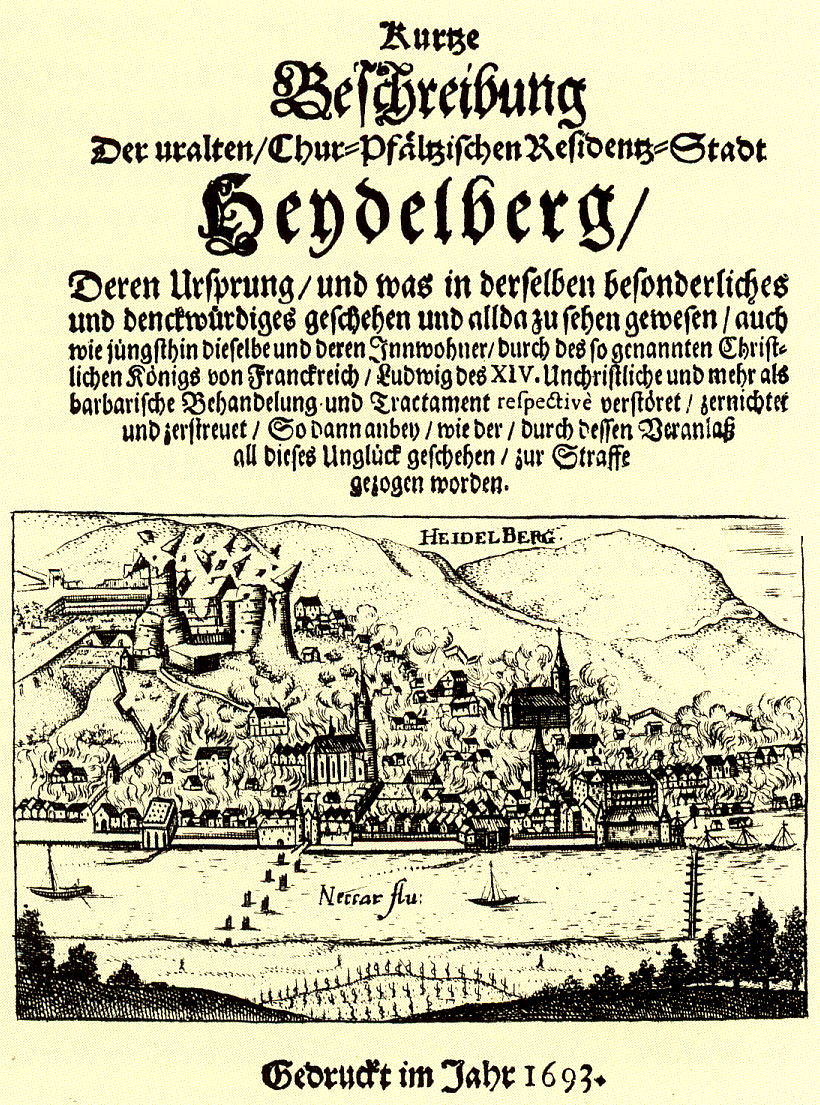
Contemporary print depicting the destruction of Heidelberg in 1693

In 1671, Karl Ludwig married his daughter Elisabeth Charlotte (better known as Liselotte von der Pfalz) for political reasons to the French Duke Philip I of Orléans, a brother of the "Sun King" Louis XIV. However, Karl Ludwig's political calculation proved to be a fatal misjudgment. After his son and successor, Charles II, died childless in 1685, the Palatinate-Simmern line of the House of Wittelsbach died out. The title of Elector passed to Philip William, a representative of the Catholic branch of the Palatinate-Neuburg family. For the French king Louis XIV, this was a welcome opportunity to claim the inheritance of the Electoral Palatinate with reference to his sister-in-law Elisabeth Charlotte. The French claims resulted in the War of the Palatinate Succession (1688–1697), which escalated into a pan-European cabinet war.

The War of the Palatinate Succession was particularly devastating for Heidelberg, as the city was captured and devastated twice by French troops under Ezéchiel de Mélac. The French waged war according to new theories of warfare, conducting a systematic campaign of destruction and acting with deliberate brutality. The first conquest in October 1688 was relatively harmless, even though the town hall and the Thick Tower on the castle were blown up. In the meantime, the French were forced to retreat back across the Rhine, but they advanced into the Palatinate again in 1693 and recaptured Heidelberg. This time, the entire city was reduced to rubble and ashes. Only a few buildings, such as the Haus zum Ritter, survived the destruction. The castle was reduced to ruins when the French blew up its towers and walls.

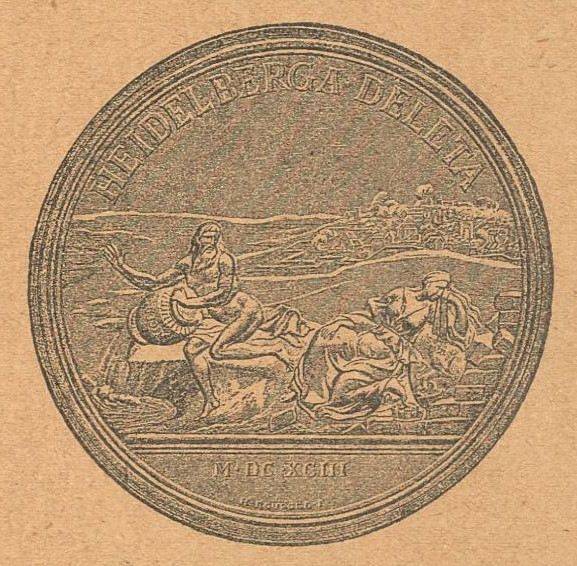
Triumph of destruction

== Reconstruction and loss of residence ==
=== Reconstruction ===
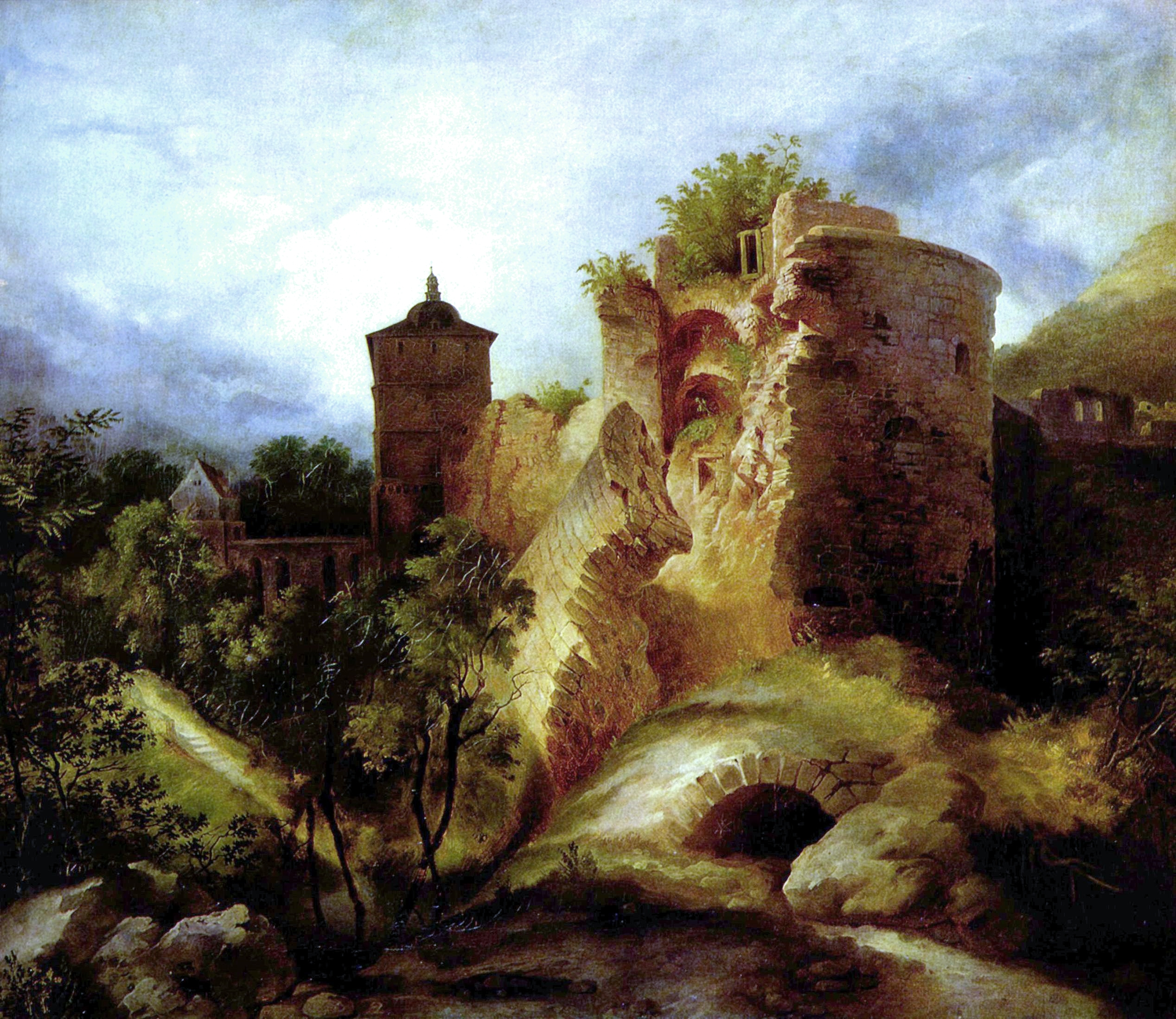
The ruined Heidelberg Castle, depicted here in a painting by Carl Blechen, hardly corresponded to the tastes of the electors anymore.

After the Peace of Rijswijk ended the War of the Palatinate Succession in 1697, the reconstruction of Heidelberg began under the aegis of Elector Johann Wilhelm. The old layout was retained, and new houses in the Baroque style were built on the foundations of the destroyed buildings. To this day, the city has retained its appearance as a Baroque city on a medieval layout. Although religious freedom had prevailed since the Peace of Westphalia, the now Catholic electors promoted Catholicism and settled Jesuits in Heidelberg. An entire Jesuit quarter sprang up in the old town, complete with a Jesuit church, college, and grammar school. As a result of the Counter-Reformation, a third of Heidelberg's population eventually converted to Catholicism. The Mariensäule (Marian column) on the Kornmarkt and the numerous statues of the Madonna on the houses in the old town, with which wealthy Catholic citizens documented their faith, are reminders of the city's recatholization. Partitions were erected in many Reformed and Lutheran churches, which were now shared by Catholics as simultaneous churches. In the Heiliggeistkirche, for example, such a partition was not removed until 1936.

=== Loss of residence ===
Because the destroyed castle was uninhabitable, Johann Wilhelm spent most of his time in Düsseldorf and partly in Weinheim. Meanwhile, Heidelberg Castle was no longer in keeping with the Baroque taste of the time, which favored spacious castle complexes modeled on Versailles. The Elector had already commissioned his court architect, Matteo Alberti, to draw up plans for such a residence, which was to be built on the plain in what is now the district of Bergheim. However, the plan failed because the citizens of Heidelberg refused to finance the construction of the castle.

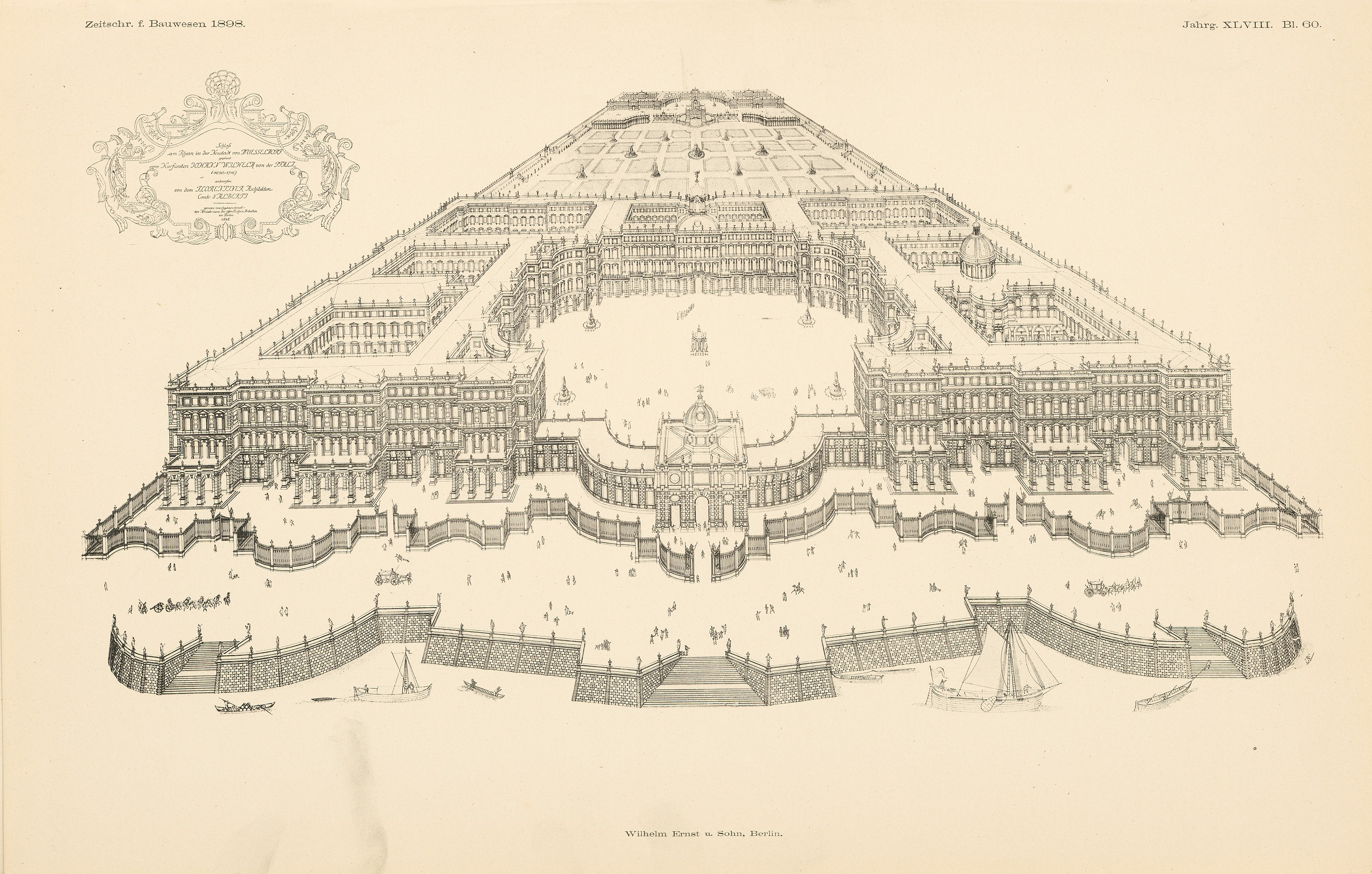
Alberti's unrealized plan for a new palace

Johann Wilhelm's younger brother and successor, Karl III Philipp, then decided to build himself a new residence. After a dispute with the Heidelberg Protestants over the Protestant Heiliggeistkirche church, which the Catholic Elector claimed for himself, he finally moved the capital of the Electoral Palatinate to Mannheim in 1720. There, he had Mannheim Palace built and the city expanded. With its geometric layout, the "square city" of Mannheim was much more in keeping with the Baroque spirit of the time and the electoral prince's desire for prestige than medieval Heidelberg. Until the completion of Mannheim Palace, Karl Philipp resided provisionally in Schwetzingen until 1728. Heidelberg lost its position as a political center of power and also suffered economically from the departure of the royal court. The university also declined into mediocrity after the loss of the residence, even though it received a new main building in 1735 with the Domus Wilhelmina, known today as the Old University.

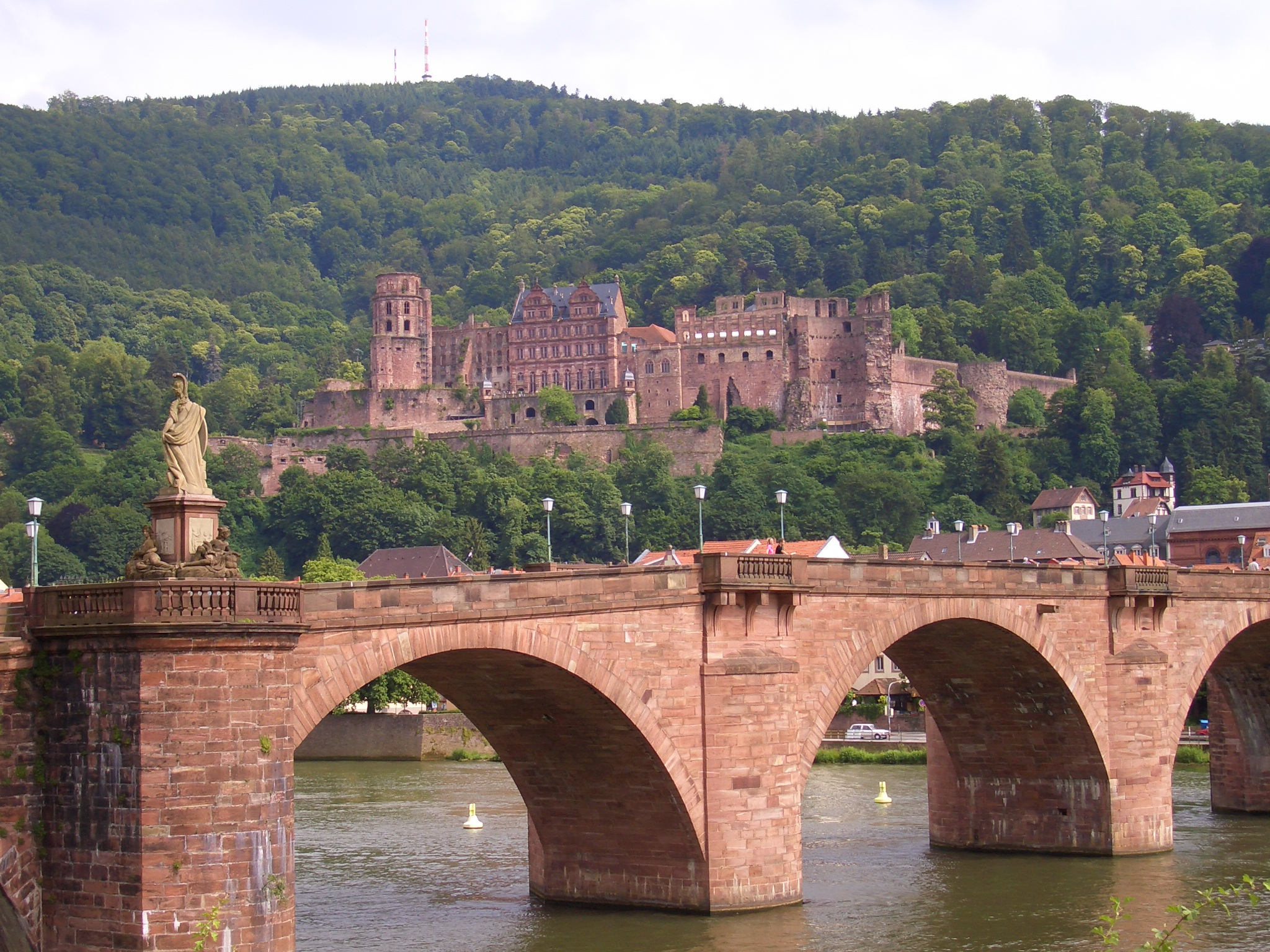
The Old Bridge bears its official name after Elector Karl Theodor.

Under Elector Karl Theodor (1743–1799), the Electoral Palatinate experienced an economic and cultural heyday, from which Heidelberg also benefited. Karl Theodor wanted to have Heidelberg Castle repaired so that he could use it as a summer residence. However, after a devastating lightning strike in 1764, the castle renovation was abandoned. The Elector was also responsible for Heidelberg's most famous landmark after the castle: the Karl Theodor Bridge, better known as the Old Bridge, which was completed in 1788. It was the ninth bridge to be built on this site after the old stone pillar bridge with a wooden superstructure had been destroyed four years earlier by flooding and ice floes, which also destroyed parts of the old town. In gratitude to the Elector, the citizens of Heidelberg had the Karlstor gate built in 1781.

== As part of Baden ==
=== End of the Electoral Palatinate ===
After France annexed the parts of the Palatinate on the left bank of the Rhine in the First Coalition War following the Revolution of 1789, the history of the Electoral Palatinate finally came to an end with the Reichsdeputationshauptschluss (Imperial Deputation Main Resolution) of 1803. The areas on the right bank of the Rhine, including Heidelberg, were assigned to Baden, which was soon elevated to a grand duchy. At the Congress of Vienna in 1815, the Kingdom of Bavaria received the Palatinate on the left bank of the Rhine (the Electoral Palatinate had already been ruled from Munich since 1777), while Baden's territorial gains were confirmed.

The Grand Duke of Baden, Karl Friedrich (1771–1811), was a supporter of the Enlightenment and a patron of the sciences. Thanks to him, Heidelberg University regained its status as a renowned educational institution. Karl Friedrich reorganized the university and turned it into a state-funded educational institution. The University of Heidelberg was given a new name that commemorates both its founder, Ruprecht I, and the reformer Karl Friedrich: since then, it has been known as the "Ruprecht Karls University" or, in Latin, "Ruperto Carola". In the 19th century, illustrious names such as the philosopher Georg Wilhelm Friedrich Hegel, the historian Heinrich von Treitschke, the chemist Robert Wilhelm Bunsen, and the physicists Hermann von Helmholtz and Gustav Kirchhoff taught in Heidelberg. The reputation of the professors, in turn, attracted a considerable number of students to the university.

=== Heidelberg Romanticism ===
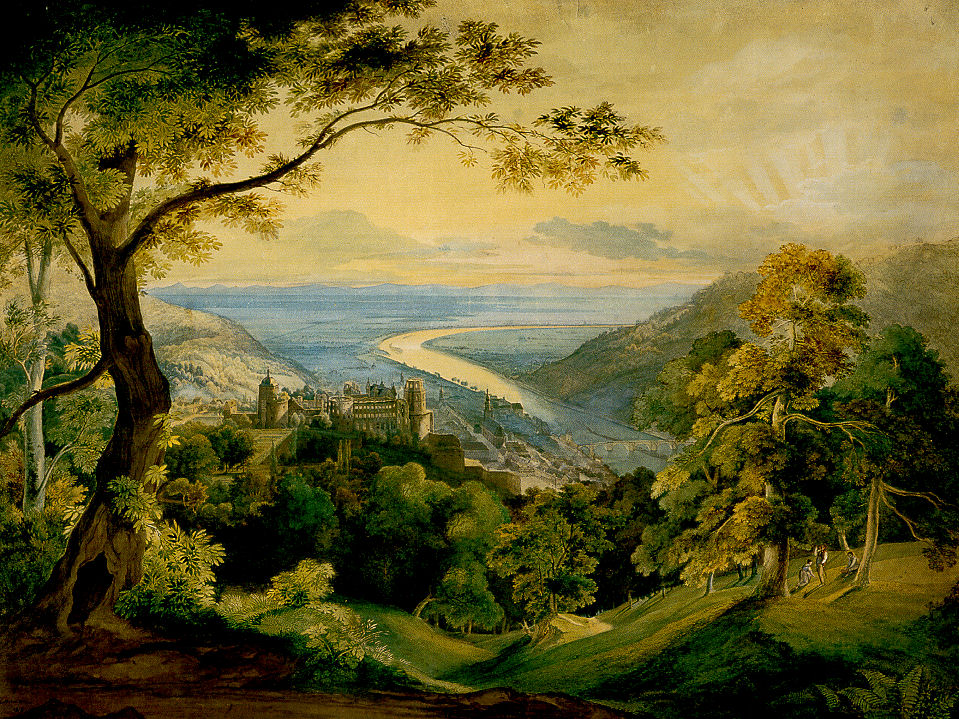
Heidelberg Castle, painting by Karl Rottmann, 1815

At the beginning of the 19th century, Heidelberg became one of the most important centers of German Romanticism. As early as 1798, Friedrich Hölderlin had immortalized the city in his ode Heidelberg. In addition to the scenic charms of the city on the Neckar River, it was above all the castle ruins that attracted Romantic writers and painters. After Jena had been the center of German early Romanticism, a group formed in Heidelberg in 1804 around the poet Achim von Arnim and the writer Clemens Brentano, whose work is known as "Heidelberg Romanticism". In the field of Romantic painting, a circle of artists formed in Heidelberg around Karl Philipp Fohr, Carl Rottmann, and Ernst Fries, inspired by the Boisserée Collection.

Between 1806 and 1808, Arnim and Brentano published a collection of German folk songs in Heidelberg under the title Des Knaben Wunderhorn (The Boy's Magic Horn). Another circle of poets formed around Joseph von Eichendorff, who studied in Heidelberg from 1807 to 1808. Influential professors at Heidelberg University, such as the rector Anton Friedrich Justus Thibaut, the lecturer Joseph Görres, and the philologist Friedrich Creuzer, were close to the Romantic movement. However, the dispute with Heidelberg philologist Johann Heinrich Voß, who was opposed to Romanticism and criticized Des Knaben Wunderhorn in particular for the unscientific methods used by its editors, ultimately led to Voß's rationalism prevailing at Heidelberg University and the demise of Heidelberg Romanticism.

=== The Pre-March period and the Baden Revolution ===
During the pre-March period in the first half of the 19th century, national, liberal, and democratic ideas were spread by Heidelberg students organized in student fraternities and by some liberal-minded professors at the university. The philosopher Ludwig Feuerbach had a major impact when he gave lectures critical of religion in Heidelberg in 1848 at the invitation of the student body. Because the university refused to provide him with rooms, he had to resort to the town hall.

During the anti-Jewish Hep-Hep riots, which took place between August and October 1819 in over 80 towns and villages in the German Confederation and beyond its borders, leading to numerous outbreaks of violence and incidents, the "Heidelberg Jewish pogrom" took place on 25 August 1819, during which the attackers vandalized and looted the homes of three Jewish craftsmen for over three hours without any intervention from the police. Only the intervention of 200 Heidelberg students and the lawyer Anton Thibaut put an end to the violent excesses reported in the contemporary press: "Hordes of Hepmen [...] armed with axes, crowbars, and similar instruments broke through the windows, shutters, and doors of several of the same, and, having almost three hours to carry out this operation, forced their way into the houses themselves, where they looted or smashed everything they found, stole all the money stored in locked desks, tore up papers, cut up beds, and caused such destruction that almost the entire street was filled with bed feathers, debris from furniture, and the like."

Under the influence of the February Revolution in France, the German March Revolution took its course in Baden. On 5 March 1848, liberal and democratic politicians from southwestern Germany gathered at the Hotel Badischer Hof for the Heidelberg Assembly of 51. This assembly provided the decisive impetus for the pre-parliament and thus for the constitution of the Frankfurt National Assembly. Heidelberg remained unaffected by the Hecker uprising in the first phase of the Baden Revolution, but numerous democratic associations were formed in the city. When the democratic student association was banned, Heidelberg students moved to Neustadt an der Haardt in July in protest. After the failure of the Frankfurt National Assembly, the May Uprising swept across Baden. The Prussian troops called in by the Grand Duke of Baden also fought against liberal guerrilla fighters in Heidelberg and ultimately crushed the uprising.

=== Tourism and the university ===
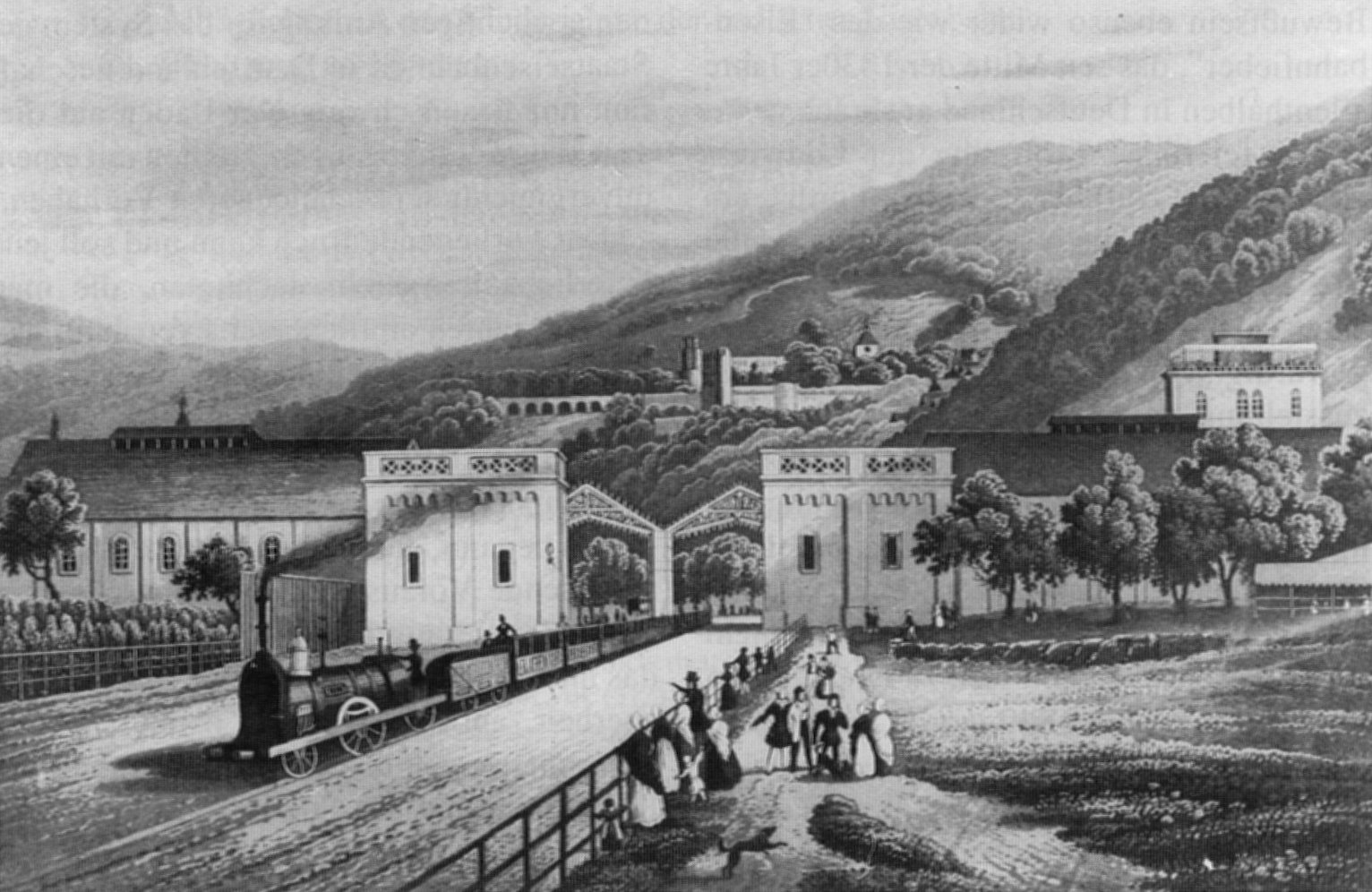
Train leaving Heidelberg station, lithograph from 1842

Even in the 19th century, Heidelberg's economy – despite being the fourth largest city in Baden – remained predominantly agricultural. Industrialization had far less of an impact on the city on the Neckar than on neighboring Mannheim, for example. Although well-known industrial companies such as Waggonfabrik Fuchs, Heidelberger Druckmaschinen, and HeidelbergCement were established in the city, by the middle of the 19th century, there were only 392 industrial workers in 14 factories in Heidelberg, which at that time had a population of around 15,000. In addition to the city's location in a valley, one reason for this may have been that Heidelberg was already aware of the value of its landscape for tourism and did not want to spoil it with factories.

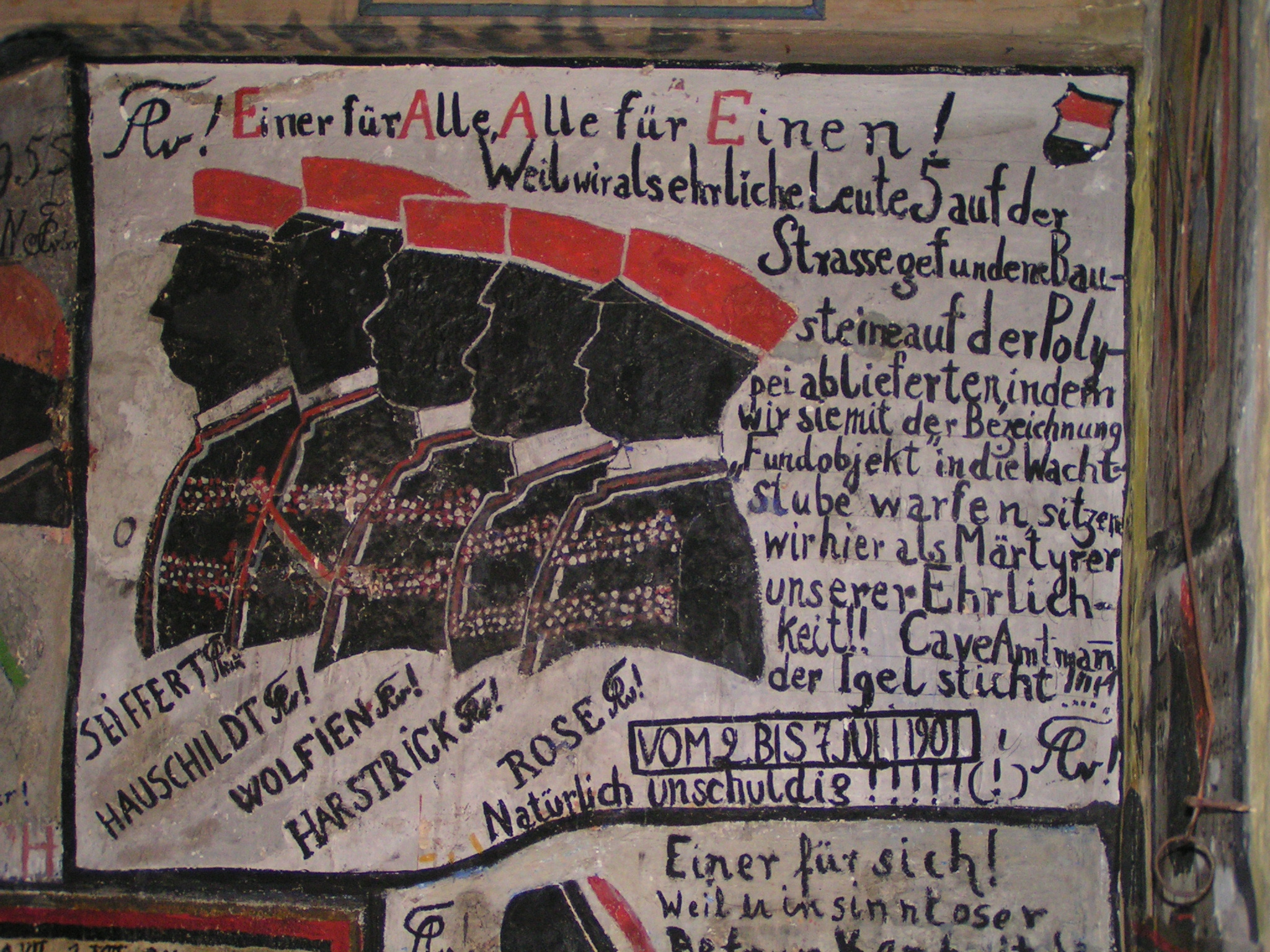
The student detention room served as a punishment cell for unruly students.

The picturesque castle ruins, although seen by many as a symbol of humiliation by the French, were spared demolition thanks to preservation efforts and subsequently became Heidelberg's most important tourist attraction. Tourism thus developed into an important economic factor in Heidelberg and has remained so to this day. Tourism in Heidelberg had already begun in the early 19th century, but it experienced an enormous boom when the city was connected to the railway network: in 1840, the Mannheim-Heidelberg section of the Badische Hauptbahn was opened, followed three years later by the connection to Karlsruhe. In 1862, the Odenwaldbahn railway line to the Neckar Valley was completed.

The presence of the university has also shaped Heidelberg since the 19th century. Economically, the publishing and printing industries based in the city benefited from the university. The Academic Bookshop Mohr & Zimmer, which published Des Knaben Wunderhorn, gave rise to the Carl Winter Universitätsverlag, which specialized in academic publications. The numerous students soon dominated the cityscape. Student fraternities, to which every second student belonged at that time, played a special role. To this day, the student fraternities' fraternity houses can be found in the best locations in Heidelberg. Joseph Victor von Scheffel's poem Alt-Heidelberg, du feine (later set to music and becoming a popular student song) and the play Alt-Heidelberg, which premiered in 1901, made the city's student milieu famous, and Heidelberg became a symbol of student life in the 19th century.

== Heidelberg from 1871 to 1945 ==
=== Urban expansion during the Wilhelminian period ===
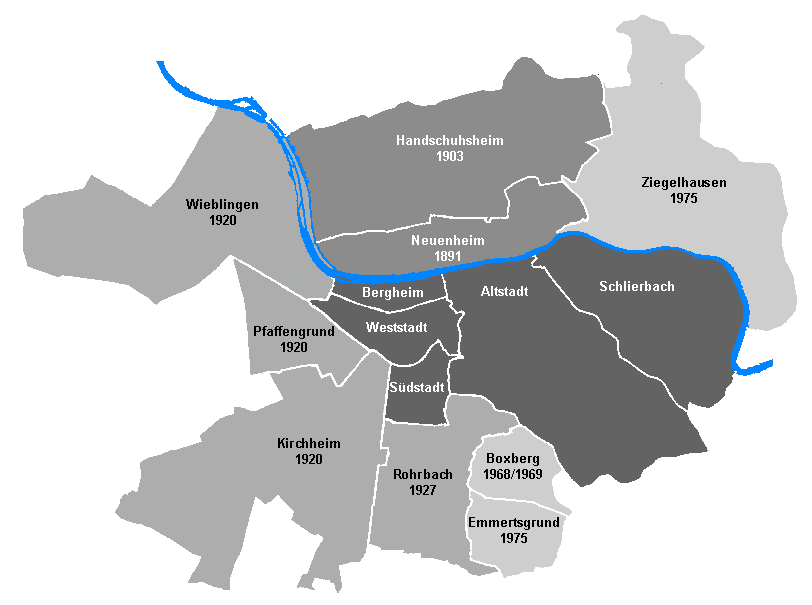
Incorporated and newly founded districts of Heidelberg

The founding period after the end of the Franco-Prussian War of 1870/1871 was an era of prosperity in Heidelberg, as it was throughout the newly founded German Empire. The new districts of Weststadt and Bergheim had already been built around the railway station. At the end of the 19th century, a phase of rapid expansion began, during which the city limits were expanded through numerous incorporations, and Heidelberg's population more than quadrupled from 20,000 in 1871 to 85,000 in 1933.

The incorporation of Heidelberg began with the integration of Neuenheim, located on the northern side of the Neckar River, in 1891. Twelve years later, the municipality of Handschuhsheim, bordering Neuenheim to the north, was incorporated. In the 1920s, Kirchheim, Wieblingen, and Rohrbach were incorporated. With the Pfaffengrund, a completely new district was created, designed as a "garden city".

The expansion of the area was accompanied by the development of infrastructure. The tramway began operating in 1885, powered by horses, and has been electrified since 1902. The mountain railway has been running to the Molkenkur since 1890 and, since 1907, to the summit of the Königstuhl. Between 1925 and 1929, the Neckar was canalized and developed into a waterway through the construction of barrages. In 1935, the Reichsautobahn from Mannheim to Heidelberg, today's Bundesautobahn 656, was opened as one of the first motorway sections in Germany.

=== The First World War and the Weimar Republic ===
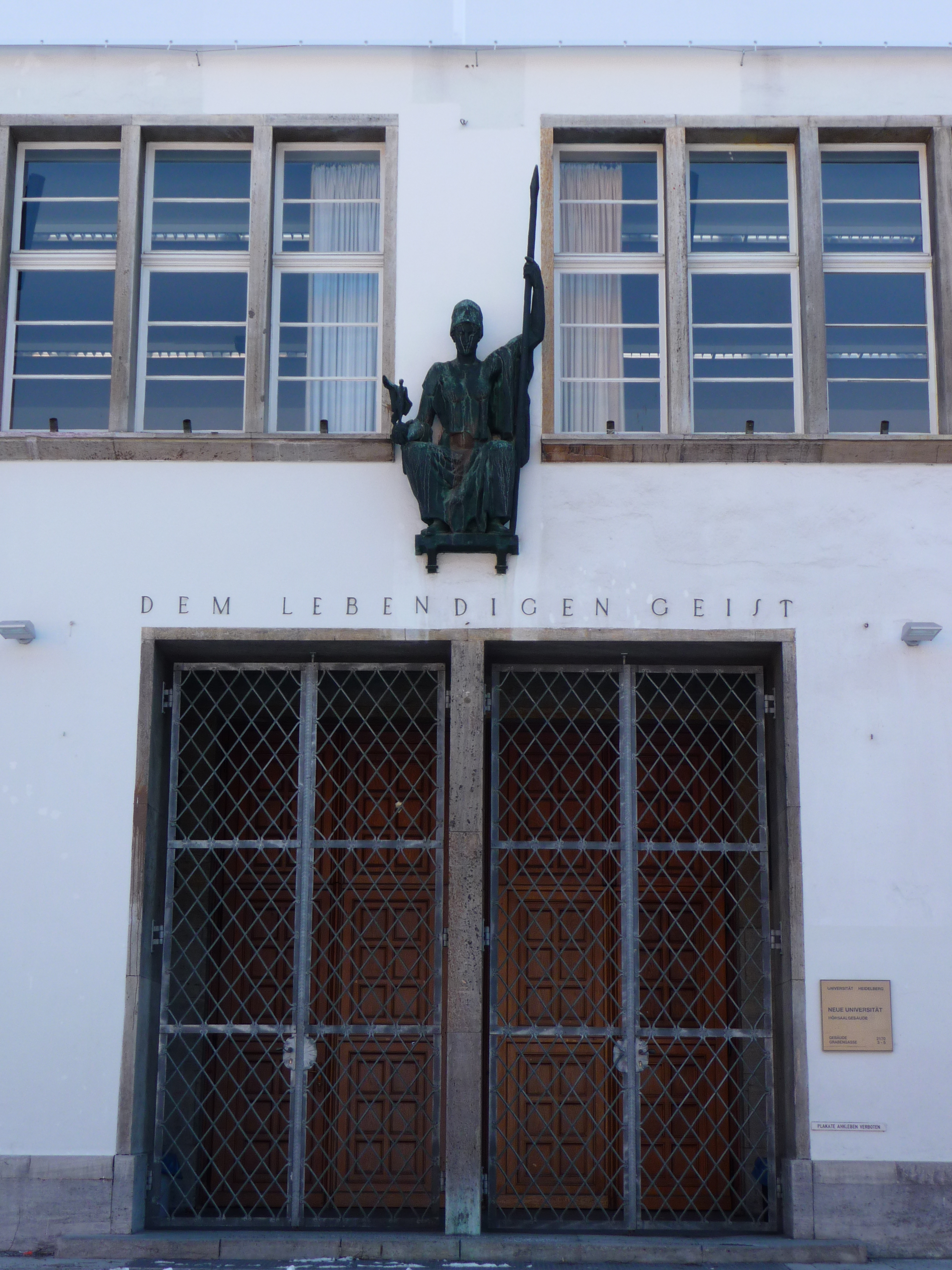
Figure of Pallas Athena and dedication "To the living spirit" above the entrance to the New University

Heidelberg remained largely unaffected by the November Revolution that followed Germany's defeat in the First World War. In Mannheim and Karlsruhe, workers' and soldiers' councils proclaimed the Republic of Baden on 14 November 1918. Shortly afterwards, Grand Duke Friedrich II abdicated. In 1919, Friedrich Ebert from Heidelberg became the first president of the Weimar Republic. After his death in 1925, Ebert was buried in the Bergfriedhof cemetery in his hometown, with the Heidelberg population turning out in large numbers to pay their respects.

In 1928, construction began on a third bridge over the Neckar, the Ernst Walz Bridge, named after the previous mayor. In 1930, donations from U.S. citizens enabled the foundation stone to be laid for the lecture hall building of the New University. Meanwhile, targeted measures were taken to promote tourism: in the 1920s, the Heidelberg Theatre Festival was launched, but it failed in 1930 after only four seasons due to financial reasons. Attempts to turn Heidelberg into a health resort were also unsuccessful, although a healing spring discovered in 1928 was used as a radium brine spring for almost three decades.

In 1925, a Heidelberg branch of the NSDAP was founded. Even during the Weimar Republic, the fascist party achieved above-average results in the Neckar region: in the Reichstag elections on 20 May 1928, it received 2.6% of the vote in the Reich, 2.9% in Baden, and 4.4% in Heidelberg; in the Reichstag elections on 14 September 1930, it received 18.3% in the Reich, 19.2% in Baden, and 30.2% in Heidelberg. This meant that by 1930, the NSDAP was already the strongest party in the city; in the 1929 state elections, its share of the vote was 14.5%, twice as high as the state average. A controversial figure in Heidelberg's history is Carl Neinhaus, who was elected mayor in 1928. He joined the NSDAP in 1933 and remained in office until 1945. Despite his National Socialist past, the politician, who had since joined the CDU, served as mayor again from 1952 to 1958.

=== National Socialist era ===
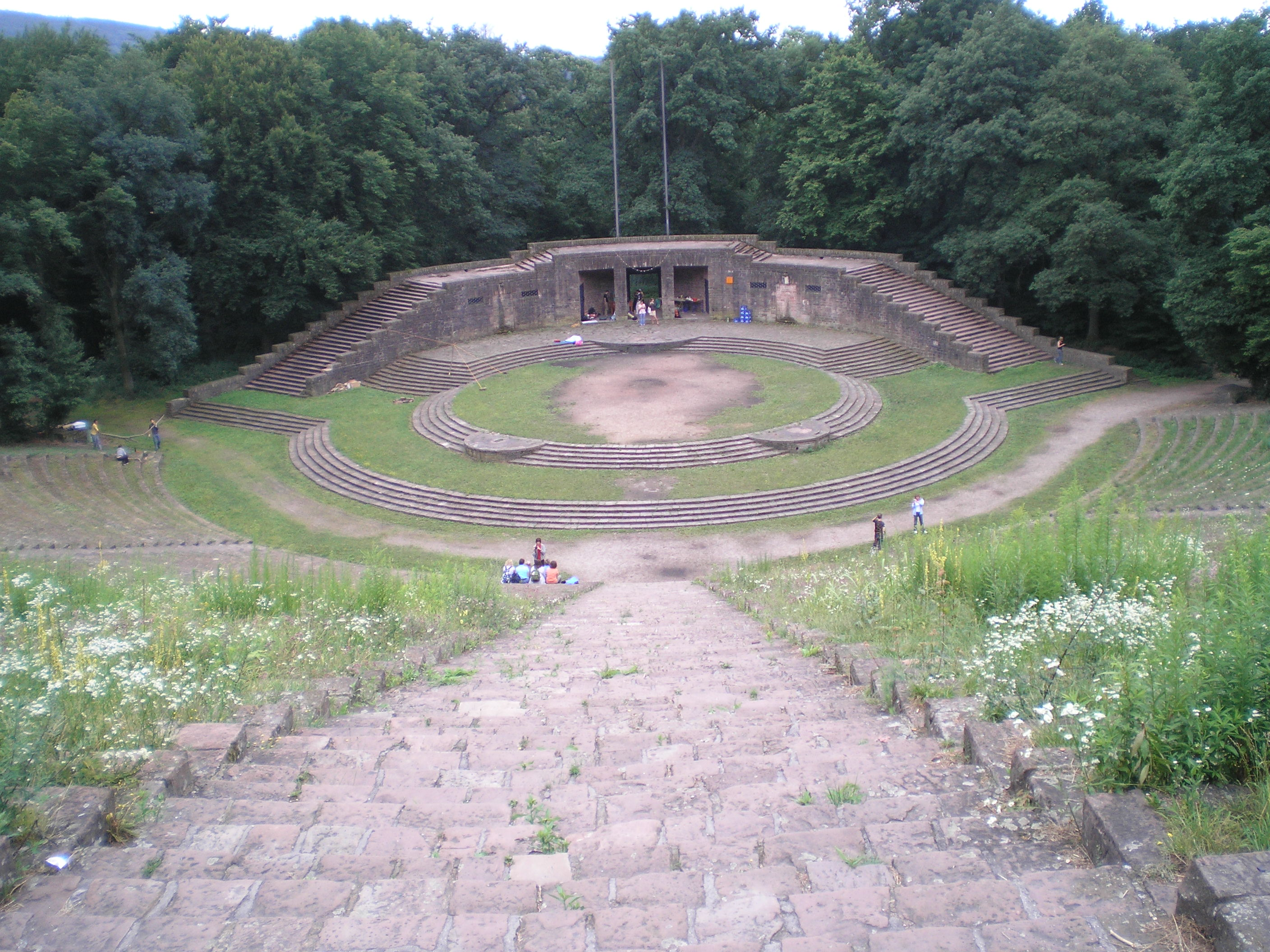
The Thingstätte on the Heiligenberg

In the Reichstag elections of 5 March 1933, the NSDAP became the strongest party in the city with 45.8% of the votes cast (Reich: 43.9%; Baden: 45.4%). Shortly after the National Socialists seized power on 30 January 1933, organized discrimination against Jews and other "non-Aryans" also began in Heidelberg. On 5 April 1933, two days before the corresponding Reich laws were enacted, Reich Commissioner Robert Wagner issued the "Baden Jewish Decree". He initiated the compulsory leave of absence of all "non-Aryan" civil servants. While National Socialism enjoyed strong support among the population of Heidelberg, anti-Semitic tendencies at the Ruprecht Karls University were not particularly pronounced compared to other universities. This was one of the reasons why the proportion of university teachers of Jewish origin was particularly high in Heidelberg until 7 April 1933, when all "non-Aryans" in public service were forced into retirement against their will. By 1939, the university had lost a third of its teaching staff for "racial" or political reasons.

Although the Nazis' plans to transform Heidelberg into a "Reich expansion site" with monumental layout, parade routes, and a festival theatre were never realized, their most visible architectural legacy is the Thingstätte on the Heiligenberg. This is an open-air stage modeled on Greek theatres, built on the site of a supposed Germanic cult site. It was built between 1934 and 1935 by the Reich Labour Service and Heidelberg students and used for propaganda events. The Heidelberg Cemetery of Honour for those who fell in the First World War was also built above the Bergfriedhof cemetery during the Nazi era.

As in numerous German university towns, the National Socialist German Students' League (NSDStB) staged a book burning on 10 May 1933 on Heidelberg's University Square. Further book burnings took place in June and July in a wave of copycat actions.

On the evening of 9 November 1938, the riots against Jews reached a new peak. That night, citizens of Heidelberg burned down the synagogues in Heidelberg and Rohrbach; the Orthodox prayer hall in Plöck was also destroyed. The next day, the systematic deportation of Heidelberg's Jews began with the deportation of 150 Jewish citizens to the Dachau concentration camp. About two years later, on 22 October 1940, the "Wagner-Bürckel Action" took place. Over 6,000 Jews from Baden, including 280 from Heidelberg, were deported to the Camp de Gurs internment camp. Three quarters of the deported Jews died in the Gurs camp. In 1942, they were deported from there to the Auschwitz-Birkenau concentration camp.

Hermann Maas, a pupil and student in Heidelberg, among other places, and pastor at the Heiliggeistkirche from 1915, joined the Association for the Defence against Anti-Semitism in 1932. He was also involved in the Emergency Ministry Association from 1933/1934. In the city, he was head of the "Church Aid Centre for Protestant Non-Aryans" in 1938, helped all those persecuted on racial grounds, and worked closely with the Grüber Office in Berlin. Using his international contacts, he helped many people classified as Jews or half-Jews to flee before the war began. Despite being banned from his profession in 1933, he preached against the inhuman policies of National Socialism. In 1943, under pressure from the Nazi regime, he was removed from office by the Protestant Church Council of Baden. He was later deported to France for forced labor. After liberation in 1945, he resumed his work as a pastor. With his thinking and, above all, his actions, he was an exception, even as a member of the Confessing Church. In 1950, he was the first official German state guest of Israel.

=== Second World War ===
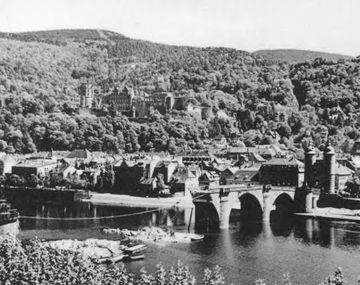
The destroyed Old Bridge

Heidelberg was one of the few major German cities to survive the Second World War virtually unscathed. The first air raid took place on the night of 19 September 1940, when the Pfaffengrund district was hit by bombs. On 23 September 1940, a German air raid on Cambridge was carried out in retaliation for this attack. Smaller air raids in 1944 and 1945 also caused only minor damage. (Note: An aerial photograph of the fire at the former Hindenburg School on May 10, 1945, provides an overview of the undamaged old town.) Of Heidelberg's 9,129 residential buildings, a total of 13 were completely destroyed (0.14%), 32 were severely damaged (0.35%), 80 were moderately damaged (0.87%), and 200 were slightly damaged (2.19%). Of 25,933 homes, 45 were completely destroyed (0.17%) and 1,420 were damaged (5.47%). The total loss of living space amounted to 0.8%. The freight depot and zoo were severely damaged by bombs and artillery fire. A total of 241 people were killed in Heidelberg as a result of air raids.

It is not entirely clear why Heidelberg was almost spared. Numerous eyewitnesses from the Old Town, Weststadt, and Pfaffengrund report that leaflets were dropped in Heidelberg a few months before the U.S. invasion with the slogan "We want to spare Heidelberg because we want to live there ourselves"; only the exact wording varies slightly depending on the report. The announcement of the city's sparing and liberation was discarded by all contemporary witnesses, so that no copy has been archived to this day. On the one hand, the city was of no great strategic importance due to its lack of heavy industry; on the other hand, it cannot be ruled out that the Americans had already considered Heidelberg as the location for their headquarters before the end of the war.

A daily order for the air raid on Bruchsal on 1 March 1945 stated that, in the event of poor visibility, the cities of Heidelberg or Donaueschingen were to be targeted and bombed instead.

Only the bridges over the Neckar, including the famous Old Bridge, were blown up by Wehrmacht troops during their retreat on 29 March 1945 to hinder the advance of the Allied forces. One day later, the U.S. 63rd Infantry Division of the 7th U.S. Army marched into the city without encountering any significant resistance. They were able to take over many buildings in the city for their own purposes, including the Großdeutschland barracks, which has since been renamed Campbell Barracks. Until the end of the war, the German Infantry Regiment 110 was stationed there, which was subordinate to the 33rd Infantry Division and, from the end of 1940, to the 112th Infantry Division and had been deployed in the French and Russian campaigns.

== Post-war period and present day ==
=== Post-war period ===
After the Second World War, Heidelberg, which was almost completely undamaged, attracted many Germans who had been bombed out and displaced. As a result, the city's population had already reached 111,800 in 1946, compared to 85,000 before the war. Heidelberg became part of the American occupation zone and the location of high command posts of the U.S. Army and NATO. To this end, the American authorities expropriated real estate, which initially caused discontent. In the 1950s, two settlements were established in the south of Heidelberg, Mark Twain Village and Patrick Henry Village, as homes for American soldiers and their families. The American influence has been strongly felt in the city ever since: the city was the seat of the NATO Land Headquarters Central Europe and the headquarters of the 7th U.S. Army, the American Army radio station AFN broadcast from Heidelberg, and thousands of American military personnel and their families lived in the city.

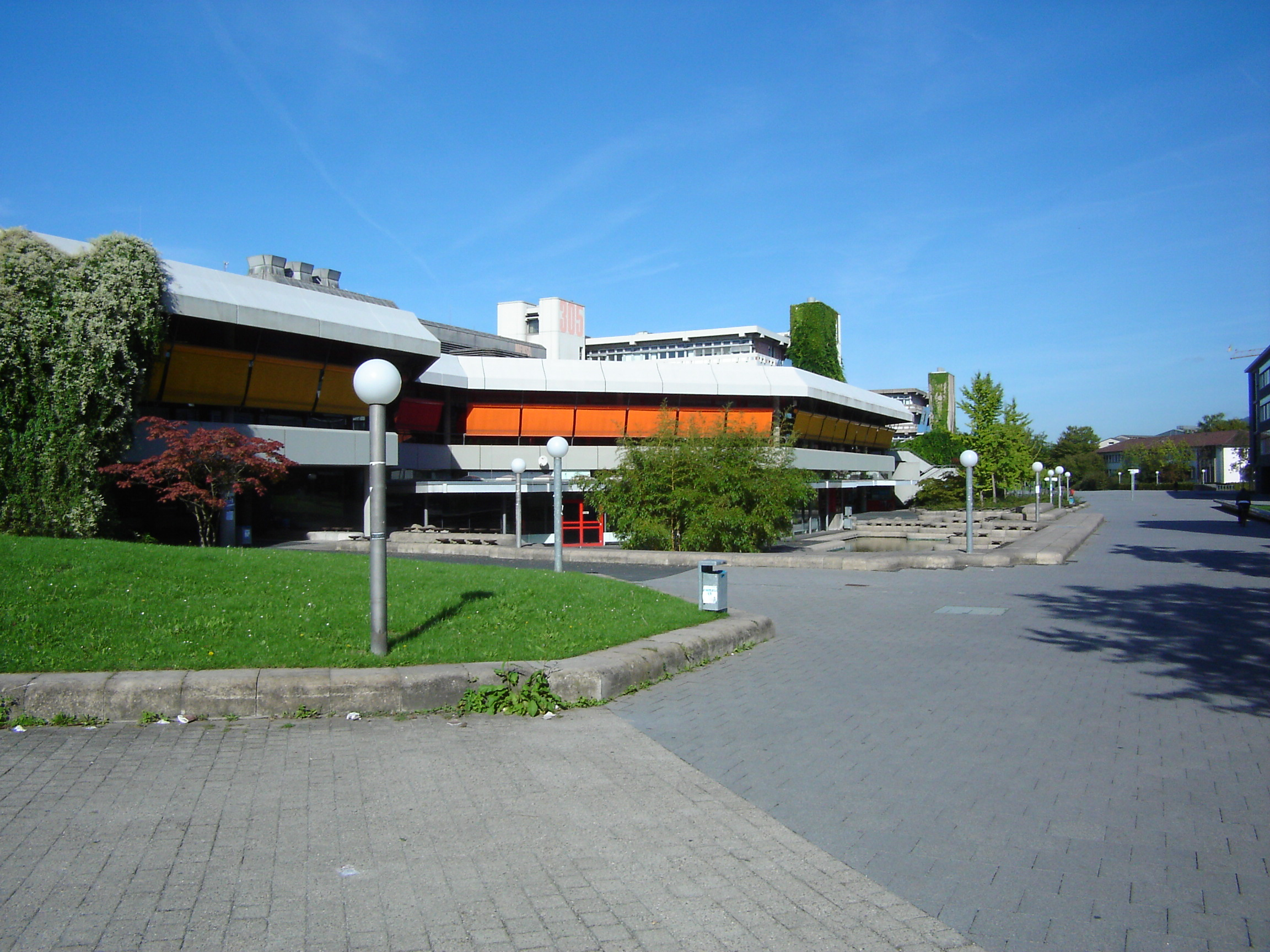
The Neuenheimer Feld Campus was built starting in 1951.

After the end of the war, Heidelberg initially belonged to the state of Württemberg-Baden, which was founded in 1945 by the American military government and merged with the states of Baden and Württemberg-Hohenzollern to form Baden-Württemberg in 1952 following a referendum.

The Ruprecht Karls University was closed by the American occupying forces in April 1945, but after a denazification process, it was the first West German university to resume teaching in January of the following year. Even before the war, some of the university's facilities had been moved from the old town campus to Neuenheim on the other side of the Neckar River, including the Botanical Garden and the Physics Institute (on Philosophenweg). From 1951 onwards, a completely new campus, the Neuenheimer Feld, was built on the western outskirts of the city. By the mid-1970s, the expansion of the 120-hectare site was largely complete. Today, it is home to numerous scientific and medical institutes, clinics, research institutes, and several student residences.

=== Heidelberg after 1955 ===
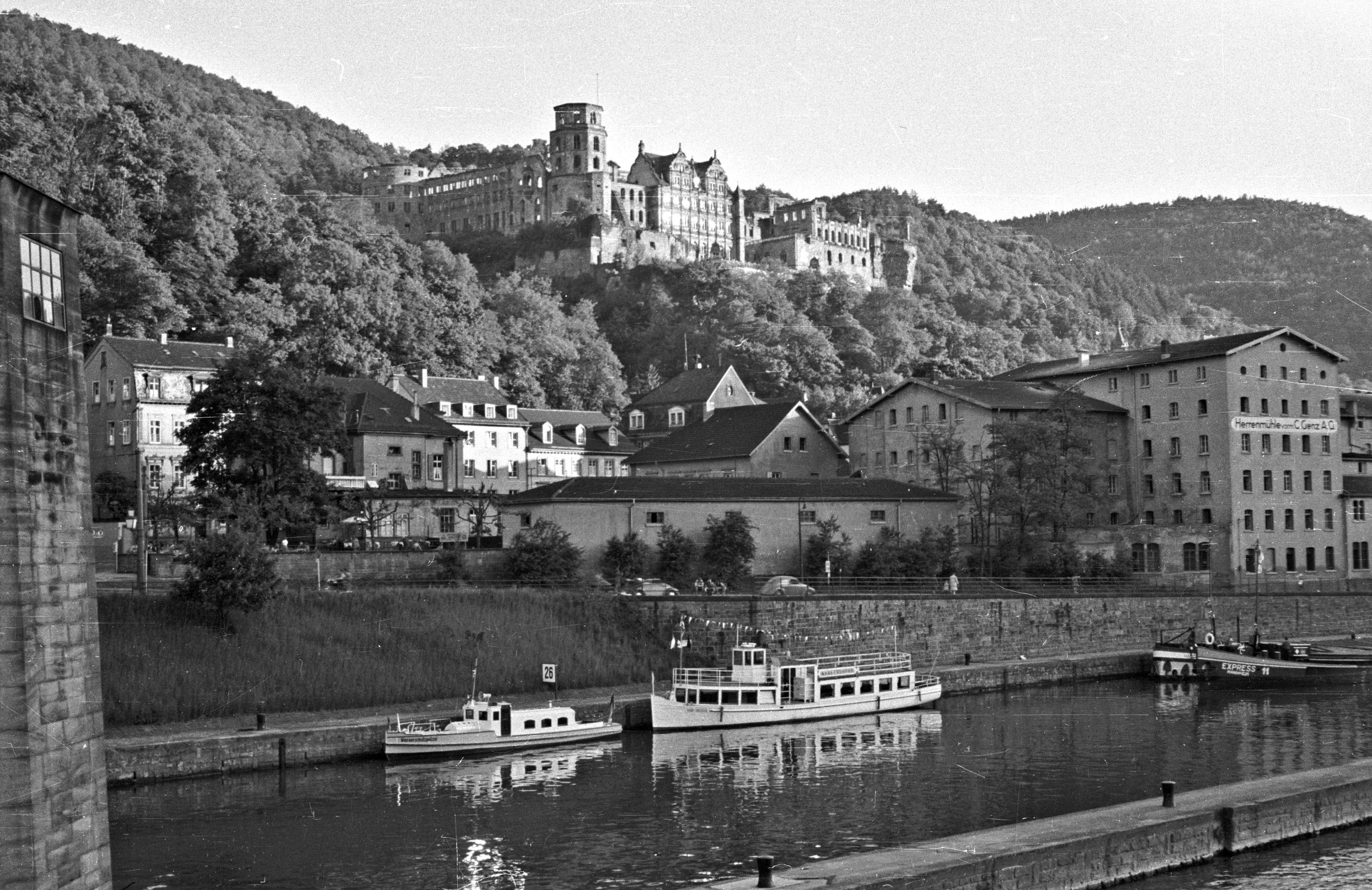
Heidelberg in the 1950s

The largest construction project of the post-war period was the relocation of the main railway station to its current location. Plans had been in place for decades to replace the terminus station on Rohrbacher Straße with a new through station. In 1955, after four years of construction, the new main station, which was the most modern station in the Federal Republic at the time, was inaugurated around 1.2 kilometers west of its old location. The state used the vacated area to construct numerous administrative buildings on Kurfürstenanlage.

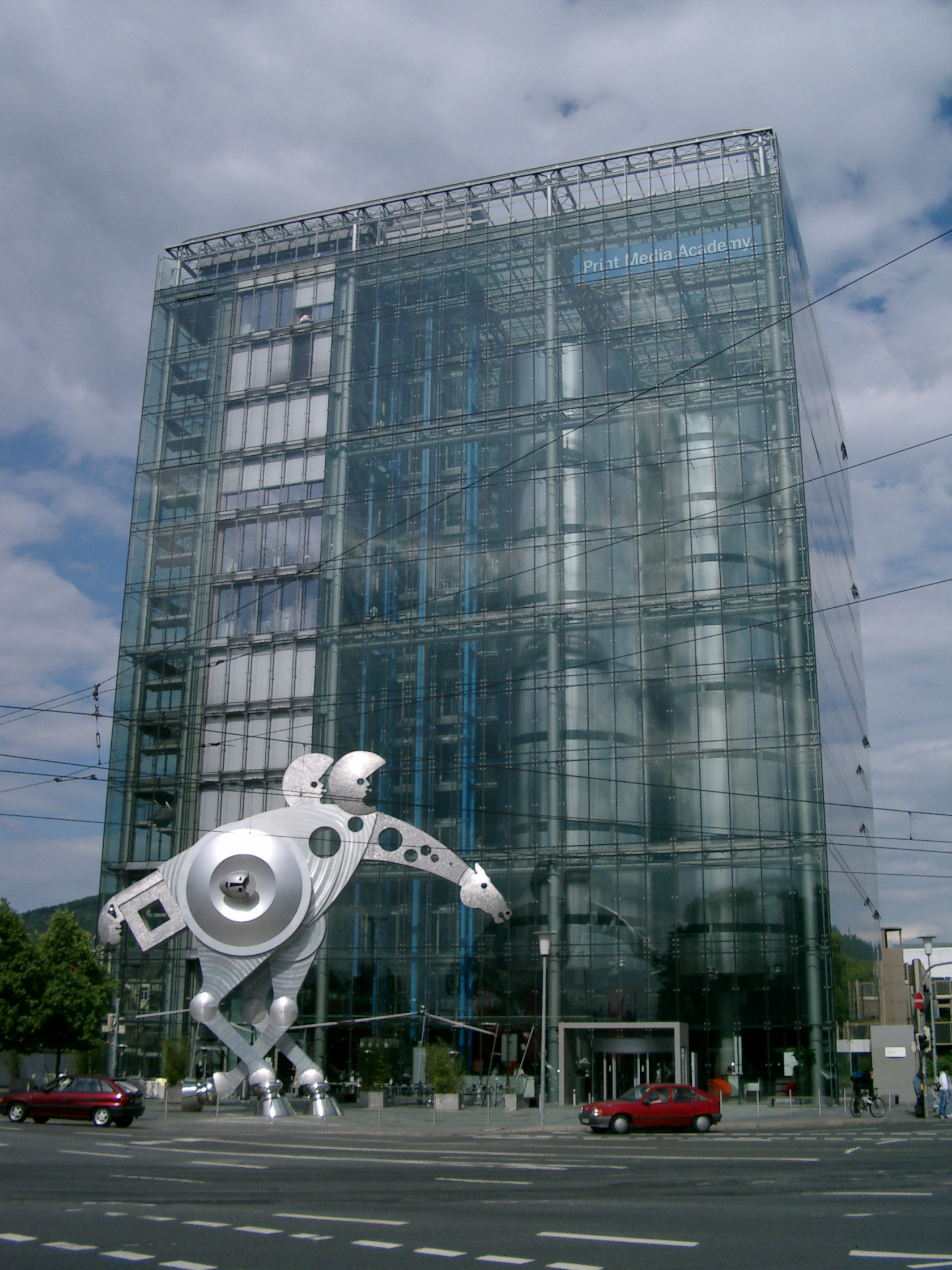
The glass cube Print Media Academy of Heidelberger Druckmaschinen was built next to the main railway station in 2000. In front of the building stands the S-Printing Horse, one of the largest horse sculptures in the world.

To accommodate Heidelberg's growing population, two completely new residential areas were built in the south of the city: in the 1960s, the Waldparksiedlung Boxberg was built for 6,000 residents. In 1975, the Emmertsgrund, designed for 11,000 residents, was completed and is now considered a problem neighborhood. In the same year, Heidelberg's expansion in terms of area was completed with the incorporation of the municipality of Ziegelhausen, located in the Neckar valley. During the district reform on 1 January 1973, the old district of Heidelberg was merged with the district of Mannheim to form the present-day Rhine-Neckar district, whose seat remained the independent city.

Reinhold Zundel, mayor of Heidelberg from 1966 to 1990, was committed to urban redevelopment. During his term in office, the Hauptstraße in the old town was converted into a 1.6-kilometer-long pedestrian zone, and the Bismarckplatz was given its current form. Not all of the measures were uncontroversial, as some old houses fell victim to them. The ban on car traffic in the old town is now considered by many to be a successful measure, among other things because it has further consolidated Heidelberg's old town as one of the most important German destinations for international tourism.

In 1967/68, as at many German universities, the student movement of the 1960s culminated in Heidelberg, expressing political protest against emergency laws, the Vietnam War, and other issues in a variety of actions. In the 1970s and 1980s, the terrorist organization Red Army Faction carried out two attacks against American military facilities in Heidelberg. On 24 May 1972, during the May offensive of the Red Army Faction, an explosive attack on the U.S. headquarters of the 7th U.S. Army in the Campbell Barracks killed American soldiers Clyde R. Bonner, Charles L. Peck, and Ronald A. Woodward and seriously injured five other people. The assassination attempt on 15 September 1981 on the commander-in-chief of the U.S. Army in Europe, General Frederick J. Kroesen, with a Soviet-made reactive anti-tank weapon of the RPG-7 type at the Karlstor in Heidelberg failed because the Baden-Württemberg State Criminal Police Office had assigned him an armored Mercedes-Benz limousine shortly before, after suspicious persons had been observed watching Kroesen.

During the term of office of the first female mayor in southwest Germany, Beate Weber (1990–2006), Heidelberg applied for the castle and the old town to be included in the UNESCO World Heritage List. The application, submitted in 2004, was rejected in 2005 and again in June 2007.

The future of the American military presence in Heidelberg was uncertain for a long time. On the one hand, European bases had lost importance for the U.S. Army as a result of the changed security policy following the terrorist attacks of 11 September 2001. As a result, the number of soldiers stationed in Western Europe was significantly reduced. In August 2011, the traditional V. U.S. Army Corps left Heidelberg and moved to Wiesbaden. With the move to the new headquarters in Wiesbaden-Erbenheim, the 65-year history of USAREUR in Heidelberg came to an end in 2013. Also in 2013, the headquarters of the Army was relocated from Heidelberg to Wiesbaden, and by 2015, the entire military administration had been withdrawn from Heidelberg, resulting in a loss of revenue of 45 million euros for the city, but also opening up opportunities for development in residential construction. In September 2013, Campbell Barracks was officially closed by the U.S. Army. The NATO Land Headquarters Central Europe was also located in Heidelberg until 2013.

At noon on 24 January 2022, an 18-year-old man opened fire in a lecture hall at the Centre for Organismal Studies at the University of Heidelberg, shooting people present. Three people were injured, and one was killed. The perpetrator then committed suicide.

== See also ==
- Heidelberg in the Roman period
- History of Heidelberg University
