= Portrait of a Humanist =

Painting by Giovanni Bellini

- Artist: Giovanni Bellini
- Year: 1475–1480
- Medium: oil on panel
- Dimensions: 35 cm × 28 cm (14 in × 11 in)
- Location: Pinacoteca del Castello Sforzesco, Milan

Portrait of a Humanist is a 1475–1480 oil-on-panel painting by the Italian Renaissance master Giovanni Bellini, depicting Peter Luder. It is now in the Pinacoteca del Castello Sforzesco in Milan. It measures 35 cm by 28 cm.

== See also ==
- List of works by Giovanni Bellini
