= Peter Luder =

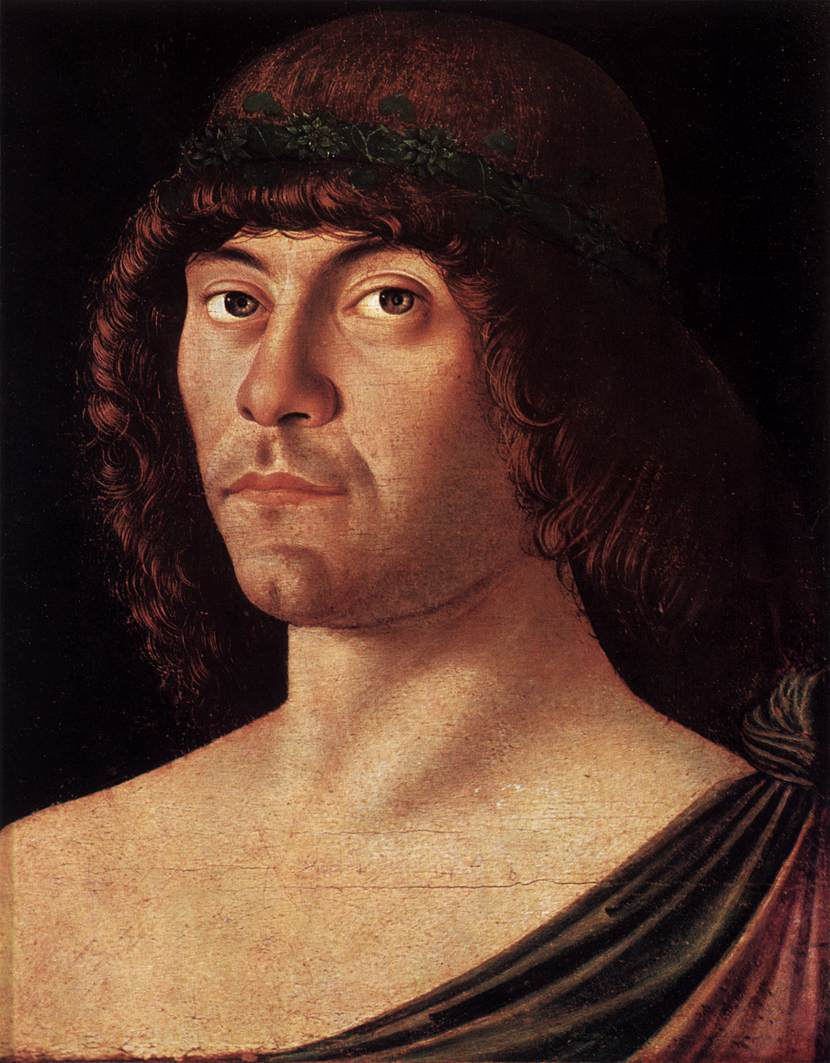
Portrait of Peter Luder by Giovanni Bellini

Peter Luder (1415–1472), was a German professor of Latin at the University of Heidelberg from 1456, was the first to introduce humanist ideas in the university.
