= Heidelberg in the Roman period =

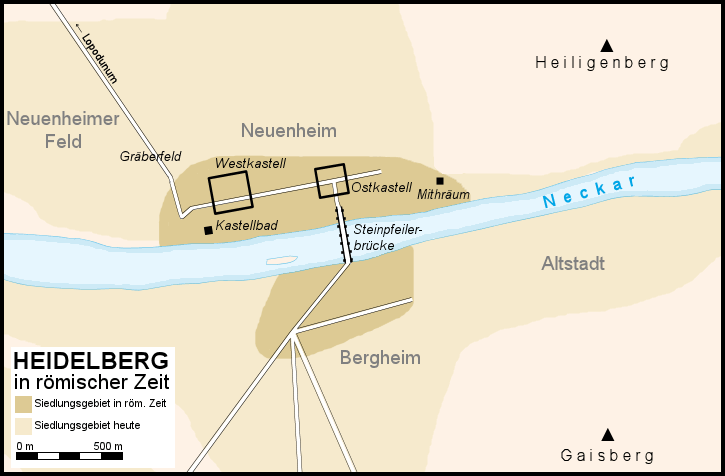
Map of Heidelberg in Roman times

During ancient Rome, a settlement of unknown name existed at the site of Heidelberg. It consisted of a fort founded around 70 AD in the present-day district of Neuenheim and a civilian settlement (vicus) that developed around the fort and also extended into the present-day district of Bergheim. The original wooden military camp was replaced by a stone fort around the year 90. In 80/90 there was a wooden bridge over the Neckar, and in 200 there was a bridge built on stone pillars. Even after the garrison of the Heidelberg fort was withdrawn around the year 135, the civilian settlement continued to flourish thanks to its favorable geographical location and developed into a prosperous pottery center. Nevertheless, Heidelberg always remained in the shadow of neighboring Lopodunum (today Ladenburg), which was the main city of the region at the time. As a result of the Alamanni invasions, Roman Heidelberg was abandoned in the 3rd century as part of the so-called Limesfall.

== Topography and name ==
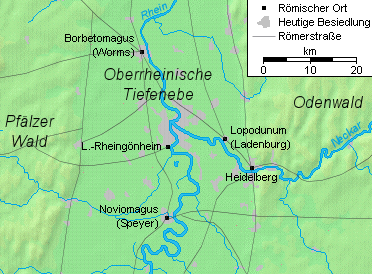
Heidelberg and surroundings during the Roman period

Heidelberg is located where the Neckar flows from the Odenwald into the Upper Rhine Plain. Located around 20 kilometers before the Neckar flows into the Rhine, Heidelberg belongs to the right area of the Rhine. The location at the intersection of the Neckar and the Bergstraße running along the edge of the mountains is extremely favorable in terms of transport geography. While the old town, the nucleus of today's city, lies wedged between the river and the mountains on the alluvial fan of the Klingenteich stream, people, before the Middle Ages, avoided the narrow and flood-prone river valley and preferred the fertile plain as a place to settle thanks to the loess soil. The 440-metre-high Heiligenberg, which rises opposite the old town on the edge of the Odenwald, has also attracted people for thousands of years due to its favorable sheltered location. Heidelberg during the Roman period was located just under two kilometers west of the old town in the plain on the north shore of the Neckar in today's Neuenheim district. The opposite shore of the Neckar in Bergheim was also inhabited in Roman times. Heidelberg's name during the Roman period is unknown. It is impossible to say whether the Romans adopted an old Celtic toponym or gave the place a Latin name. Suggestions such as Traiectum ad Nicrem ("Neckar Crossing"; analogous to Traiectum ad Mosam, today Maastricht) must be considered purely speculative. Rufiana, mentioned by the ancient geographer Claudius Ptolemy as the site of a fort, is now associated with Ludwigshafen-Rheingönheim. Piri Mons, which has also been suggested, was the name of an unknown mountain on the right area of the Rhine, possibly Heiligenberg in Heidelberg, but not the settlement on the site of Heidelberg.

== Pre-Roman period ==
The area that is now Heidelberg has been permanently settled since the Neolithic period. The Celts were the predecessors of the Romans in the Heidelberg area during the Latène period. According to the ancient authors Ptolemy and Tacitus, the Celtic inhabitants of southwestern Germany were members of the Helvetii tribe. In the 5th century BC, the Celts founded a fortified city (oppidum) on the top of the Heiligenberg. Two centuries later, for reasons unknown, the settlement on the hill was abandoned. There were numerous small Celtic settlements on both sides of the Neckar River in the plain at the foot of the mountain. There were numerous small Celtic settlements on both sides of the Neckar, in the plain at the foot of the mountain. In the 1st century BC, the Helvetii gave up their ancestral homes under pressure from the advancing Germanic tribe of the Suebi under Ariovistus. In Heidelberg, this can be seen in the abrupt destruction of archaeological finds from the late Latène Period.

== Neckar Suebians ==
After their mass emigration, the Helvetii tried to gain a foothold in Gaul. This served Gaius Iulius Caesar as a reason for the Gallic War. In 58 BC, the Romans under Caesar defeated the Helvetii at Bibracte, conquered Gaul by 51 BC, and advanced as far as the Rhine. The area east of the Rhine, known as Agri decumates, remained largely uninhabited for almost a century and is described by Ptolemy as a "Helvetic wasteland". After the attempt to conquer Germania, which had begun under Augustus, had failed, the Romans expanded the Rhine as an external border from 17 AD during the reign of Emperor Tiberius and began to settle Germanic ethnic groups loyal to Rome in the area on the right of the Rhine to protect the Rhine border. A sub-tribe of the Suebians settled on the lower reaches of the Neckar. The Neckar Suebians were given the status of a civitas and were thus integrated into the Roman administrative system. The main town of the Civitas Ulpia Sueborum Nicrensium was Lopodunum, today's Ladenburg.

The Neckar Suebians initially retained their Elbe-Germanic culture and settled in their own village communities. In Heidelberg, Neckar Suebian villages can be found in the present-day districts of Bergheim, Wieblingen, and Kirchheim. Under the influence of Roman culture, the Neckar Suebians were Romanized until the 2nd century.

== Incorporation into the Roman Empire ==
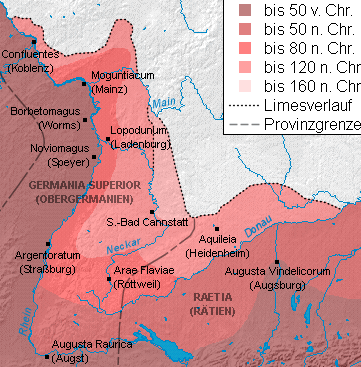
Roman expansion in southwestern Germany

The final incorporation of Heidelberg into the Roman Empire and the construction of the Roman fort took place under Emperor Vespasian (69–79). After the latter had emerged victorious from the turmoil of the Four Emperors' Year and had put down the Batavian Uprising on the Lower Rhine in the year 70, he had the Kinzig road built in 73/74, to shorten the approach route from the Danube to the Middle and Lower Rhine. At the same time, the Roman army was also pushed eastwards along the northern Upper Rhine. The Romans replaced the Neckarsuebian militia with their troops and built several forts to secure the border: In addition to Heidelberg, new forts were built in Aquae (Baden-Baden), Lopodunum (Ladenburg), and Groß-Gerau.

In Heidelberg, the first fort, called Ostkastell, was abandoned after just a few years and relocated a few hundred meters to the west. The wooden west fort built in 74 was destroyed by fire and replaced by a stone fort on the same site around the year 90. The first pile bridge over the Neckar was built around 80/90. Settlements (vici) developed around the fort on both sides of the Neckar, which soon grew and prospered economically thanks to Heidelberg's favorable geographical location.

In 85, the army districts of the Upper and Lower Rhine were converted into civilian provinces. As a result, Heidelberg became part of the province of Germania Superior (Upper Germania), whose capital was Mogontiacum (Mainz). In response to an uprising by the provincial governor Lucius Antonius Saturninus in Mogontiacum, the Romans considered it necessary to further improve the traffic situation between the Rhine and the Danube. For this reason, at the same time as the construction of the Neckar-Odenwald Limes, a new military road was probably built between Mogontiacum and Augusta Vindelicum (Augsburg) between 100 and 120. This route also passed through Heidelberg and crossed the Neckar.

In the 2nd century, the Roman border was pushed forward again with the construction of the Upper Germanic-Rhaetian Limes. Around 135, the unit previously stationed in Heidelberg was withdrawn and relocated to the Limes in Butzbach in the Wetterau region. However, the civilian settlement continued to prosper after the soldiers left. The old wooden bridge was replaced by a stone pillar construction around the year 200.

== Germanic invasions and Roman retreat ==
In the 3rd century, the Roman Empire experienced a serious imperial crisis when external threats and internal unrest shook the Roman state. In the east, the Romans were threatened by the Persian Sasanian Empire, on the Danube the Goths exerted pressure, and on the Rhine was an onslaught by the Alemanni. In 233, this Germanic tribe overran the Limes for the first time and raided Roman territory. Despite several campaigns against the Alamanni, the Roman emperors were unable to stabilize the situation, with the result that raids and pillaging became more frequent in Upper Germania over the next few decades. At the same time as the usurpation of Postumus, who founded a special Gallic Empire in 260, there was a devastating invasion by the Alamanni, Franks, and Juthungi. Around 260/70, the Romans were forced to abandon the Limes and withdrew to the Rhine and the Danube (Limesfall). Although Emperor Diocletian (284–305) succeeded in consolidating the Roman Empire, the provincial territory on the right territory of the Rhine was finally lost.

Heidelberg was also affected by the Alamannic raids. Archaeological evidence shows that the vicus burned down several times around the middle of the 3rd century - presumably as a result of the Alamanni pillaging it. In response to the invasions, the gate towers of the stone fort were reinforced. Evidence of the crisis can also be seen in the finds of a pottery and metal deposit in a Roman cellar as well as a coin hoard, which was buried at the west gate of the fort in the 1930s for fear of the Germanic tribes and was never dug up again. A milestone from the year 253 is the latest known Roman inscription in Heidelberg and (together with another milestone from Lopodunum) in the Upper German region on the right territory of the Rhine. The military site in Heidelberg was finally abandoned at the latest when the Romans withdrew from the Limes.

== Post-Roman period ==
After the abandonment of the Limes, the Alamanni began to colonize the vacated land, as evidenced by grave finds from the 4th and 5th centuries in Heidelberg. However, the Roman fort and vicus were abandoned and the bridge fell into disrepair. Unlike in neighboring Lopodunum, where the Romans built a burgus as a military bridgehead on the right territory of the Rhine as late as the 4th century, the Romans did not rebuild their presence in Heidelberg. The oldest parts of Heidelberg date back to village foundations from the time of the Frankish colonisation in the 6th century, while the actual city was only founded in the Middle Ages at the foot of the castle and was first mentioned in 1196. There is therefore no continuity between the ancient settlement in the Heidelberg area and the history of today's city, which began in the Middle Ages.

== Structures ==
=== Fort ===
A sequence of several Roman forts can be traced in Heidelberg. The first forts were made of wood. They, therefore, did not last very long and had to be renewed every 10–15 years. There is evidence of four successive wooden forts in the eastern part of Neuenheim. The Ostkastell was located on both sides of today's Ladenburger Straße between Keplerstraße and Werderstraße. The exit port (Porta praetoria) on the south side faced directly onto the Neckar bridge. During the reign of Emperor Vespasian (69–79), the eastern fort was abandoned and leveled. For an unknown reason, the Romans moved the site of the fort around 500 meters to the west. The first three western forts were also built of wood.

Around the year 90, the wooden construction was replaced by a stone fort. It was located roughly in the area of today's Posselt, Kastellweg, Gerhart-Hauptmann and Furchgasse streets and had an almost square shape with sides measuring 176 or 178 meters. The camp wall, built from colored sandstone ashlars, was around 5 meters high and 1.80-2.20 meters thick. Behind the wall was a mound, in front of which was a pointed ditch 5–8 meters wide and 3.50 meters deep. There were four trapezoidal corner towers and 16 intermediate towers on the wall. The Heidelberg Fort was laid out according to the typical pattern of Roman military camps: There was a gate on each of the four sides, where the moat was interrupted and protected by two massive stone towers. The center of the camp was the staff building (Principia) with writing rooms, armory, and a flag sanctuary. The Via praetoria, the main axis of the rectangular road system, led from the staff building to the porta praetoria to the south. The two side gates (Porta principalis dextra and sinistra) were connected by the Via principalis. At right angles to this, the via decumana ran to the north gate, the porta decumana. The soldiers were housed in shacks with ten living units for eight soldiers each and a separate apartment for the centurion, each providing space for one centuria. Like the stables, the shacks were built using half-timbered construction. The commander's residence (praetorium) and baths, a storage building (horreum) and presumably also the military hospital (valetudinarium) were built of stone.

The discovery of the bone end reinforcement of a bow and arrow in the area of the eastern fort suggests that a unit of archers was temporarily stationed in Heidelberg. As bows and arrows were not commonly used by the Romans, they must have been auxiliary troops from Syria, Thracia or Spain. Finds of brick stamps as well as a dedicatory inscription and an iron axe stamp prove that two cohorts of auxiliaries were stationed in succession in the western fort: the Cohors XXIV Voluntariorum and the Cohors II Augusta Cyrenaica. The latter consisted of 480 foot soldiers and 120 horsemen and originally came from Cyrenaica in present-day Libya. This unit was withdrawn around 135 and relocated to the Limes in Butzbach.

=== Vicus ===
After the Heidelberg fort was founded, smaller civilian settlements (vici) developed around it. At the beginning of the 2nd century, the camp villages grew and merged into a large vicus on both sides of the Neckar. Even after the withdrawal of the garrison from the fort, the vicus continued to exist and even flourished. Nevertheless, Heidelberg never developed an urban character and always remained in the shadow of nearby Lopodunum (Ladenburg), which also never attained the legal status of a municipium, but was urban thanks to its basilica, forum, and theater.

The vicus stretched along the highway and covered a fairly large area of around 30 hectares. The appearance of the vicus was characterized by the striped houses typical of Upper Germania. These buildings were half-timbered, and from the 2nd century onwards also made of stone, and were characterized by their narrow floor plan: The narrow side, which always faced the street, was only 6–12 meters wide, while the length of the house could be up to 38 meters. In addition to residential buildings, stores and workshops, there were also public buildings in the vicus, such as several temples and a bathhouse. The settlement's water supply was probably ensured by a pressure pipe made of clay pipes.

The inhabitants of the Roman vicus lived mainly from trade and crafts. Pottery was made in Heidelberg due to the rich clay deposits in the area of today's Ziegelhausen. The wood required for firing could be obtained in the Odenwald and floated through timber rafting down the Neckar, while the convenient location facilitated distribution. The vicus of Heidelberg thus developed into an important pottery center. A total of 60 enclosed or semi-enclosed chambers for pottery have been identified. The tools of blacksmiths, carpenters, tanners, painters, bricklayers, carpenters, and butchers found in Heidelberg are evidence of other trades. An unusual set of scales, whose originally gold-plated weighing pans were decorated with portraits of Emperor Domitian (reigned 81–96), bears witness to trading activities.

The Heidelberg vicus has largely been built over, meaning that much of the archaeological substance has been destroyed. Large-scale excavations were never carried out; only in the area of Ladenburger street, 80-84 were four strip houses excavated.

=== Neckar bridge ===
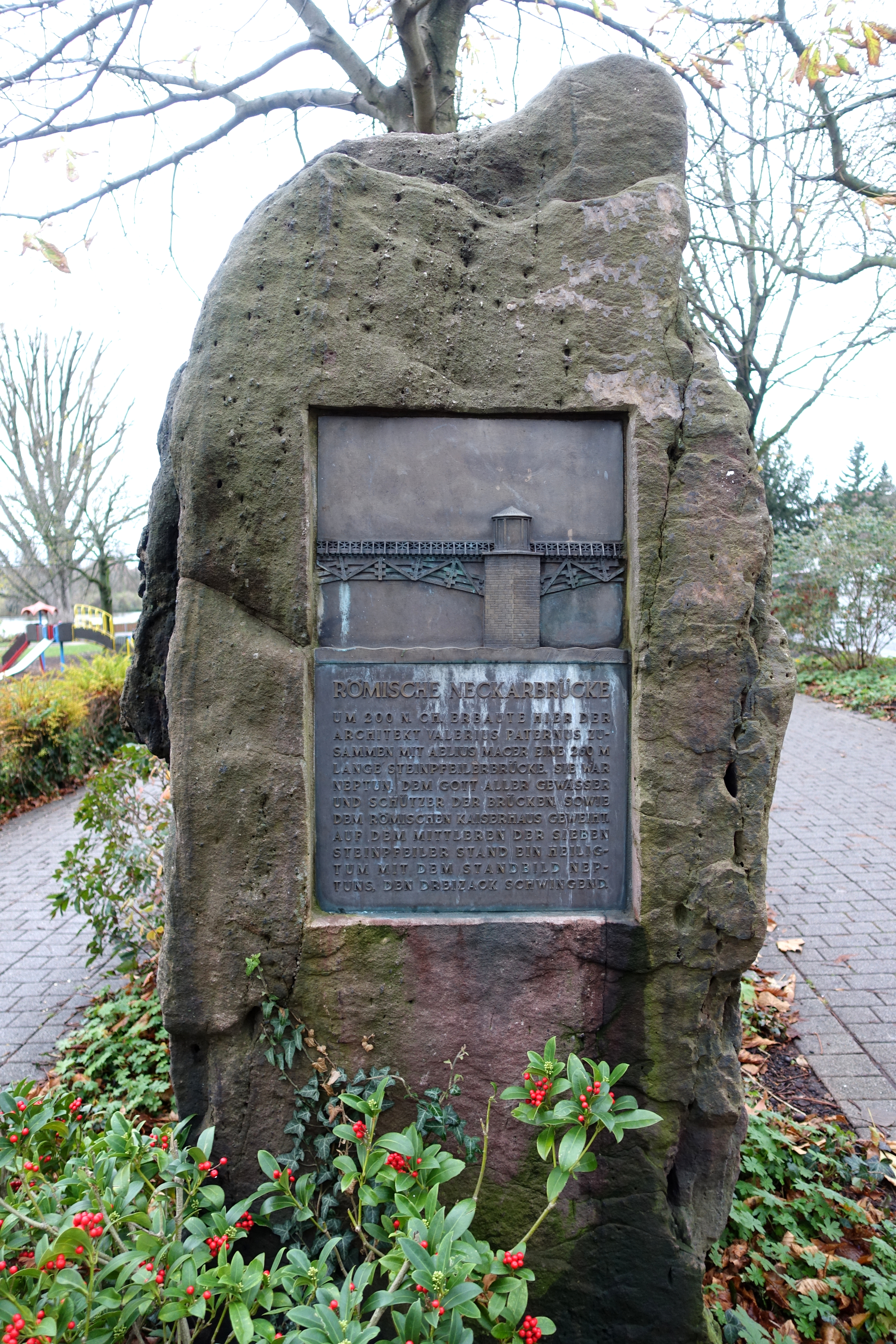
Memorial stones on both sides of the Neckar mark today the site of the former Roman bridge.

The Roman Neckar Bridge crossed the river at the site of a ford that had already been used in prehistoric times, approximately at the level of today's Kepler Street on the Neuenheim side and Thibaut Street on the Bergheim bank. The first bridge was built around 80/90 at the latest. However, it may also have been founded at the time of Emperor Nero (54–68), when the Romans had not yet permanently incorporated Heidelberg into their empire, but had already established strategic outposts on the right bank of the Rhine. This first construction was a wooden pile bridge. It was replaced by a stone pier bridge around the year 200.

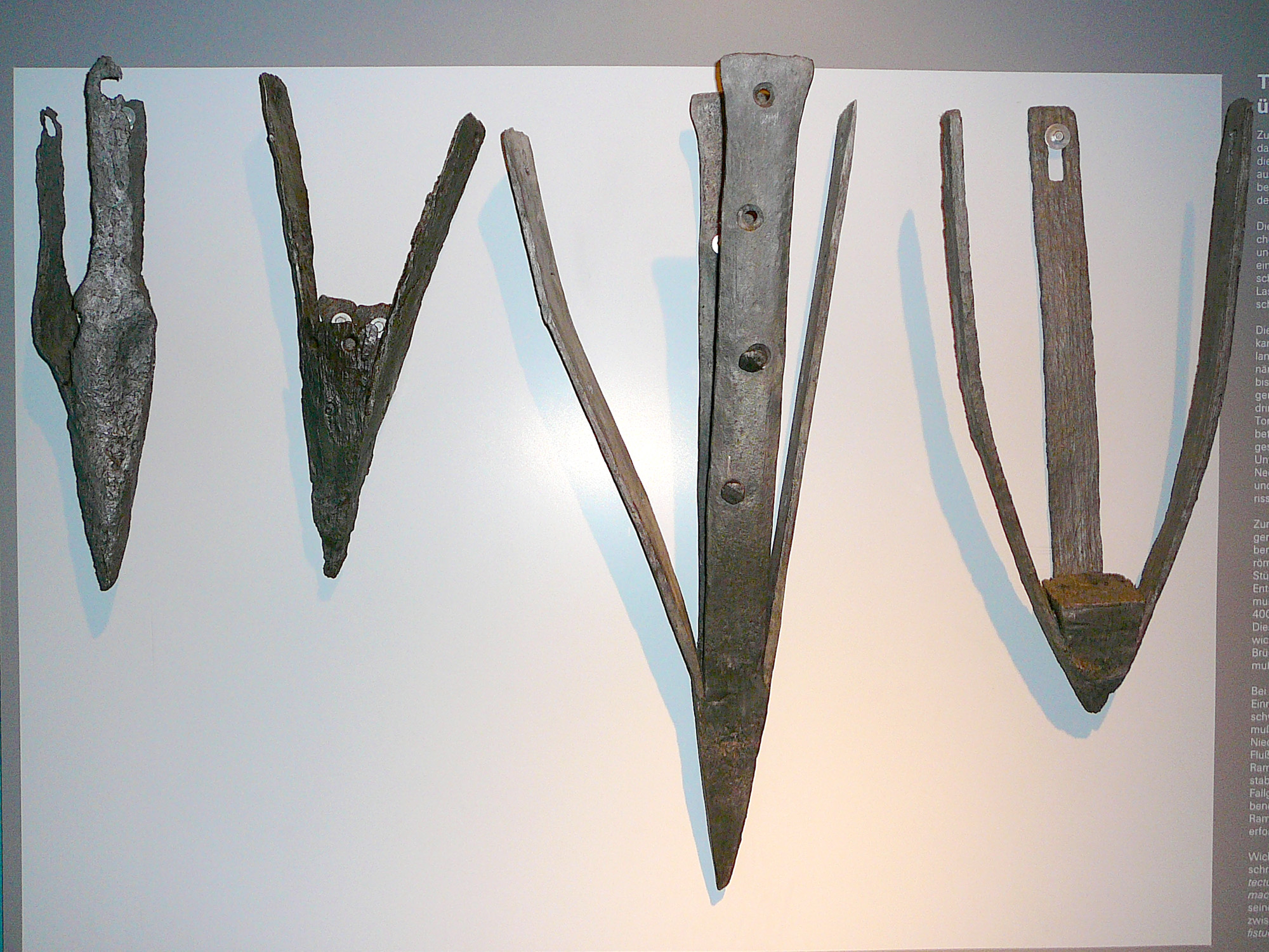
Roman pile shoes (two on the left)

The Roman bridge consisted of a wooden superstructure resting on seven stone pillars and was 260 meters long. Like the highway leading to the bridge, the roadway was probably nine meters wide and was ten meters above the mean water level. The piers were 34.50 meters apart and had a ground plan of 15.80 meters long and 7.20 meters wide. The colored sandstone blocks of the pillar were founded on pile grids consisting of oak piles with iron pile shoes. A Neptune sanctuary with a small chapel was located on the central pillar. Its altar bears the name of the bridge's master builder, Valerius Paternus. There is evidence of a quay wall on the bank downstream of the bridge, which indicates a harbor. A beneficiarius station was located at the southern bridgehead, which the Legio VIII Augusta had set up to protect the bridge after the garrison withdrew from the Heidelberg fort around the year 150.

The altar of the Neptune sanctuary was found in the Neckar in 1876. A year later, the wooden pillar foundations, which protruded from the river at low tide, were examined for the first time. The northern abutment of the bridge was cut in 1894. During the lowering of the riverbed in 1972, a total of 43 oak piles from the pier foundations were recovered.

=== Religious monuments ===
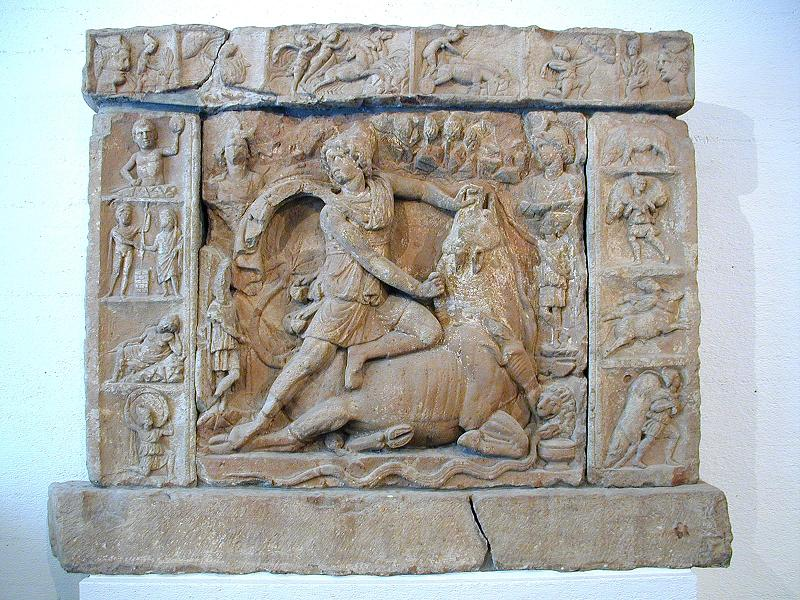
Relief with bull slaying scene (Mithraeum I, 2nd century)

Numerous dedications and religious monuments from Roman times have been found in Heidelberg, which prove that alongside Roman gods such as Jupiter, Minerva, Neptune, Fortuna, Hercules, and Vulcanus, oriental deities such as Mithras and the Celtic-Germanic gods Cimbrianus and Visucius were also worshipped. Evidence of the blending of Roman religion with indigenous beliefs can also be seen in several Jupiter Columns found in Heidelberg. These pillar-mounted depictions of Jupiter riding down a giant were typical of the north-western provinces. They usually belonged to smaller sanctuaries or stood in busy places with important traffic connections.

On the summit of the Heiligenberg was a cult area with several temples and a giant Jupiter column. One of the cult buildings was excavated in 1983 under the ruins of the medieval Monastery of St. Michael. The Votive offerings discovered during the excavations prove, that the god Mercury was worshipped in this building. His equation with Cimbrianus or Visucius (Interpretatio Romana) could indicate a connection with an older Celtic sanctuary on the same site. The monastery of St. Michael also has a certain continuity with the Roman temple, as the archangel Michael, like Mercury, is considered to accompany the dead into the afterlife.

From the 2nd century onwards, various oriental mystery cults spread in Heidelberg, especially among merchants and soldiers, above all Mithraism. There were two large Mithraic shrines (Mithraeums) in Heidelberg. In Mithraeum I, several relief images were found depicting various central motifs of Mithraic iconography. They depict Mithras killing a mythical bull (tauroctony), Mithras with the sun god Sol, and Mithras on horseback. They were discovered in 1838 at Neuenheimer Land Street 80.

=== Cemeteries and tombs ===
The Romans always buried their dead outside the settlements. For this reason, the cemeteries in Heidelberg were also located along the arterial roads to the west of Neuenheim and to the south of Bergheim. With over 1400 graves, the Neuenheim cemetery, which stretched 450 meters along both sides of the road to Lopodunum, is one of the largest in Roman Germany. The cemetery is extremely well preserved, as its area was used for agriculture for a long time and remained untouched under the protective humus layer. When Heidelberg University built a new campus in Neuenheimer Feld in the 1950s and 60s, the grave field was archaeologically excavated. The grave finds date from the period between the late 1st century and the turn of the 3rd century. It is unclear why the cemetery was abandoned half a century earlier than the vicus.Cremation burials were predominant in Heidelberg, as in most provinces of the empire, but from the end of the 2nd century, as in many parts of the Roman Empire, the custom of inhumation burials also became more widespread. Depending on the financial circumstances of the deceased, the graves were marked by simple wooden plaques or imposed stone tombs. One particularly monumental example is a richly decorated pillar tomb around 25 meters high from around 200, which was discovered in Rohrbach in 1896. It was located at a highly visible spot on the Roman highway south of Heidelberg and belonged to the cemetery of a nearby villa rustica.

== Research history ==
Philipp Melanchthon was one of the first scholars to study the Roman history of Heidelberg. In 1508, the philologist and reformer attempted to decipher the Roman inscriptions embedded in the walls of the monasteries on the Heiligenberg. In 1613, the historian Marquard Freher reported on finds from Roman times in his work Origines Palatinae. The Neuenheim mithraeum was discovered in 1838. The philologist Friedrich Creuzer, who was working at the Heidelberg University at the time, published a treatise on the find. Systematic archaeological investigations were carried out in Heidelberg from the middle of the 19th century under the direction of Karl Pfaff and were continued by Ernst Wahle after the First World War. To exhibit the finds excavated in Heidelberg, the city of Heidelberg bought the Palais Morass, which housed the Kurpfälzisches Museum in 1908. After the Second World War, Berndmark Heukemes devoted himself to researching Roman Heidelberg and was able to document the ancient remains before they were destroyed by the building boom of the 1950s and 60s.

Unlike in Mainz or Trier (Augusta Treverorum), there are practically no remains of ancient Heidelberg to be seen in today's city. Most of the individual finds from the excavations are on display in the Kurpfälzisches Museum of the City of Heidelberg and the Badisches Landesmuseum in Karlsruhe.

== See also ==
- History of Heidelberg
- History of Heidelberg University
