= Heiligenberg (Heidelberg) =

Large wooded hill overlooking the town of Heidelberg in Germany

Coordinates: 49°25′33″N 8°42′22″E

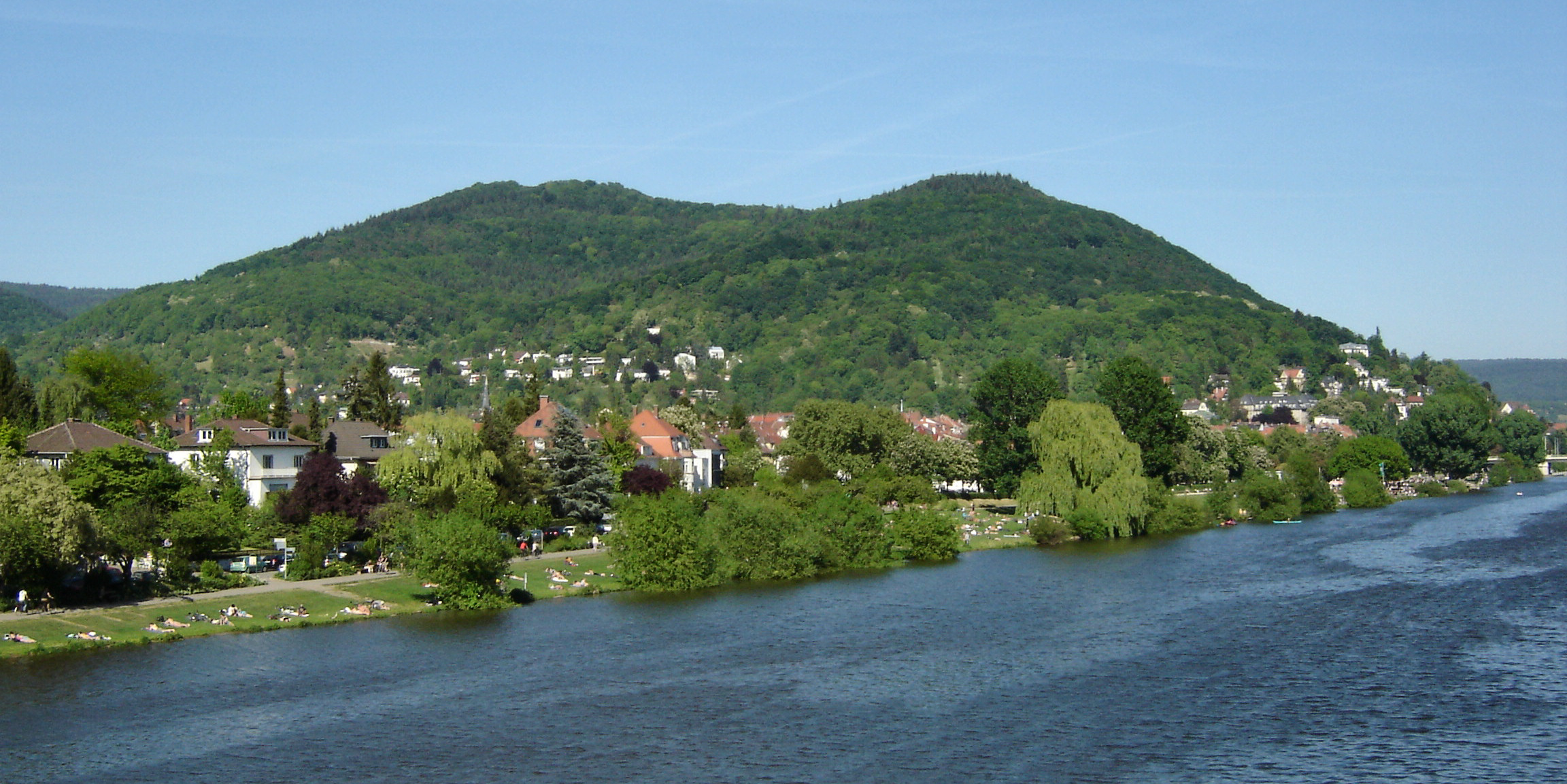
- Heiligenberg (left) and Michaelsberg (right), viewed from downstream on the Neckar

Highest point
- Elevation: 439.9 m (1,443 ft)

Geography
- Location: Heidelberg, Baden-Württemberg, Germany

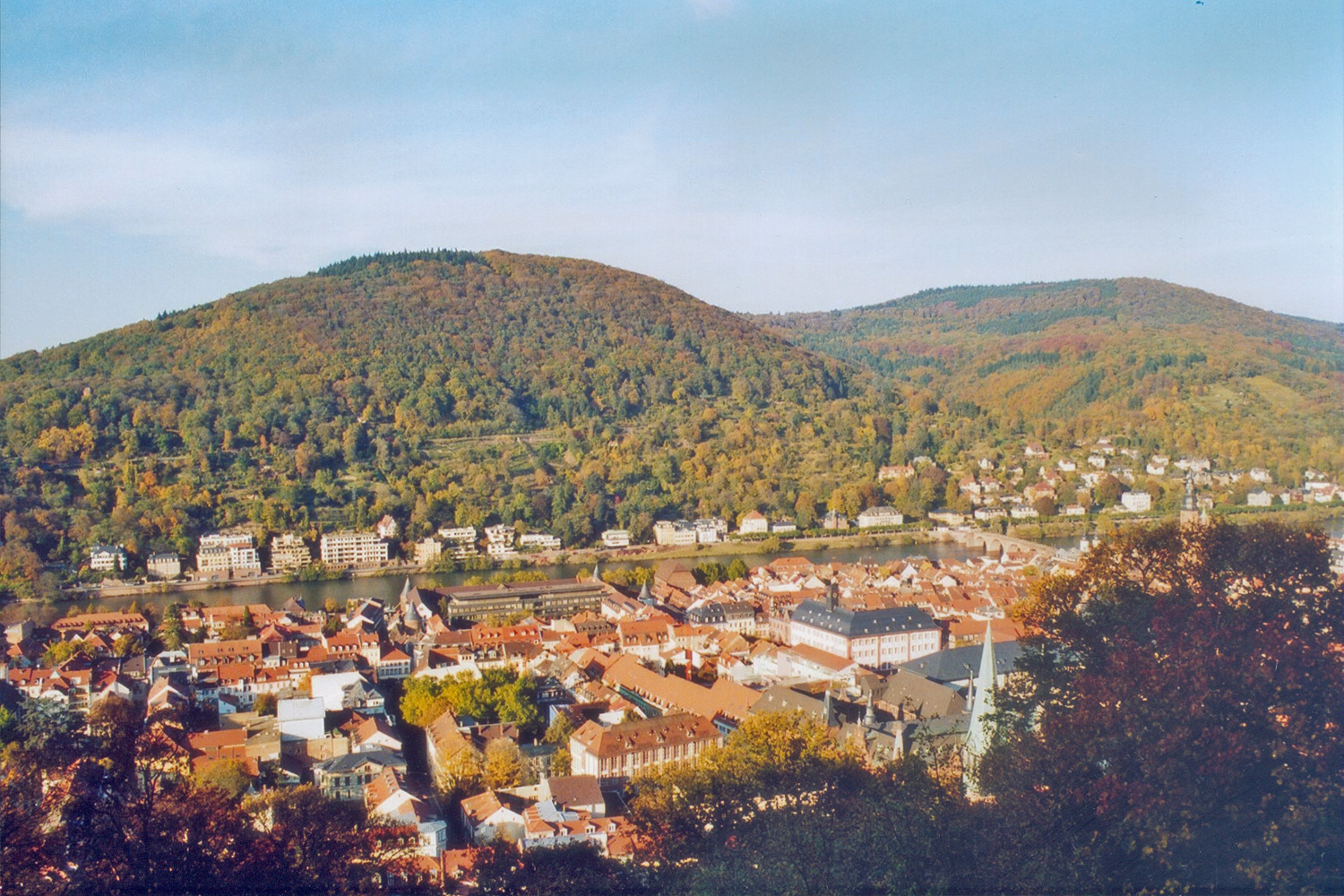
The Heiligenberg viewed from across the river; in the foreground the old town of Heidelberg

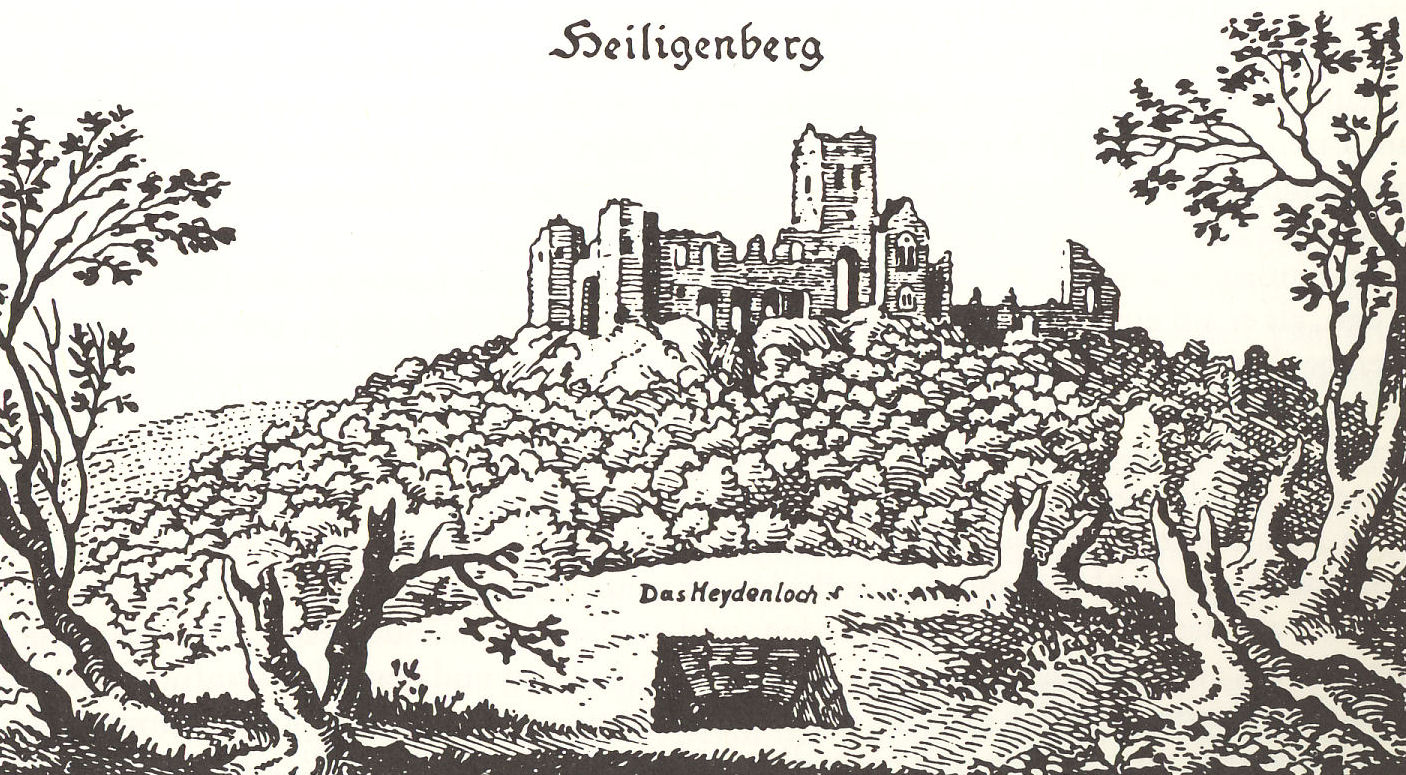
1645 engraving of the Heiligenberg and the Heidenloch by Matthäus Merian

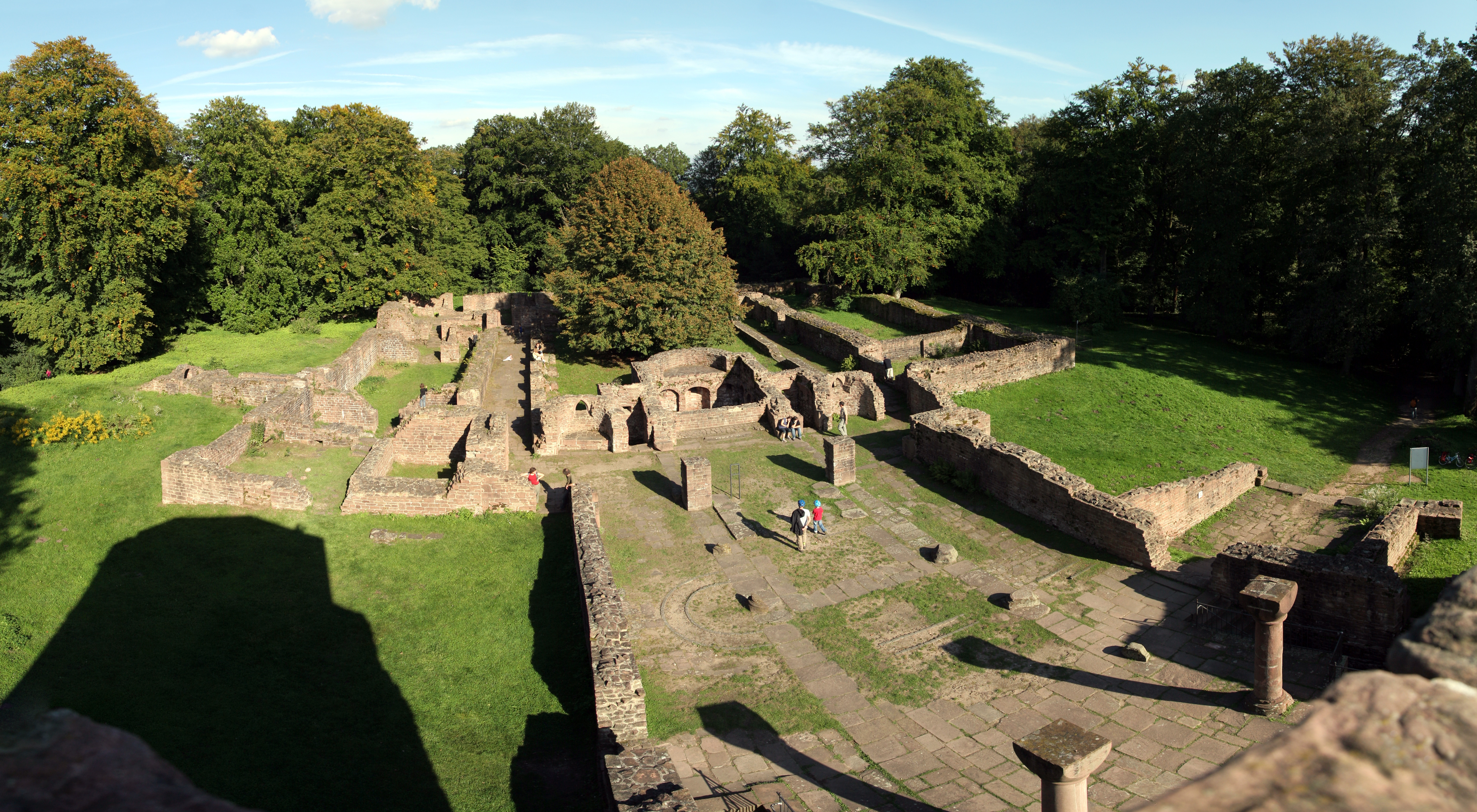
Ruins of early 11th-century Monastery of St. Michael

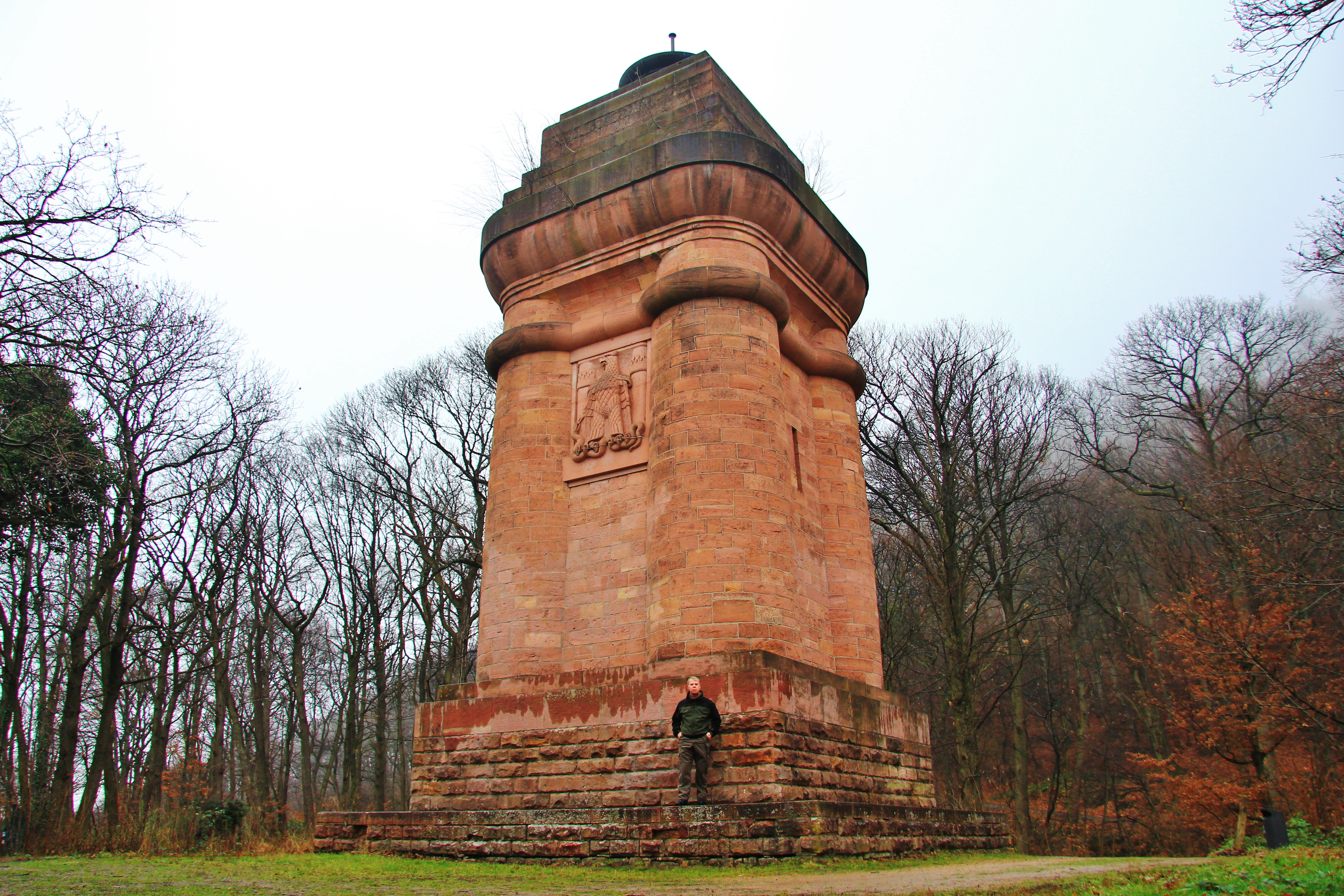
Bismarck Tower

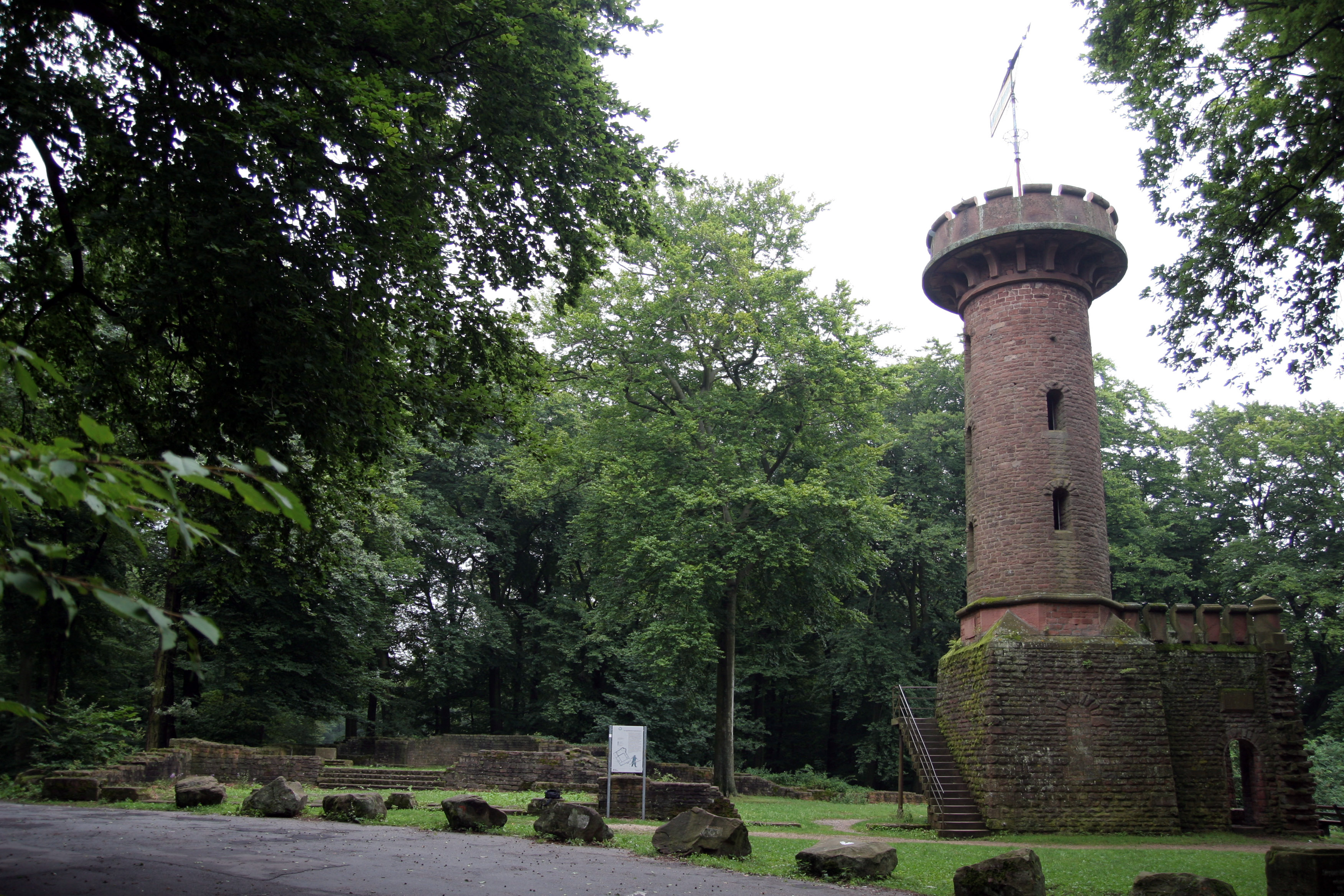
Heiligenberg Tower and ruins of late 11th-century Monastery of St. Stephen

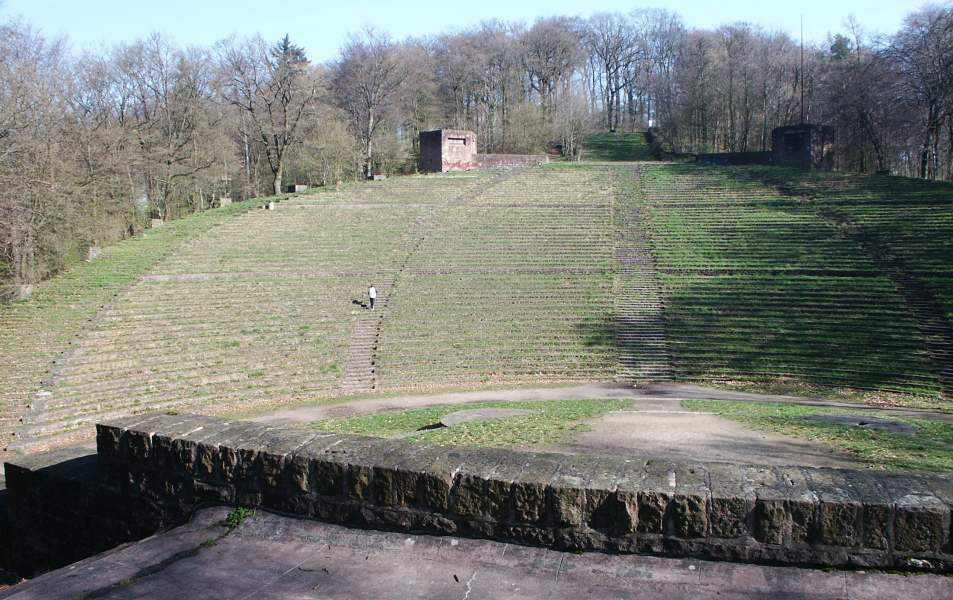
Heidelberg Thingstätte open-air theatre, view from the stage

The Heiligenberg is a large wooded hill overlooking the town of Heidelberg in Baden-Württemberg, Germany. It rises to around 440 metres NHN (short for normalhöhennull or "standard elevation zero," the equivalent of sea level in Germany). It has been the site of many historic and pre-historic constructions, including a Celtic hilltop fortification, a Roman sacred precinct, several medieval monasteries, modern lookout towers and the Heidelberg Thingstätte, built by the Nazis in the 1930s.

== Etymology ==
The hill was called the Aberinsberg in the Carolingian period; in 1265 Premonstratensians from All Saints' Abbey in the Black Forest took over the two monasteries on the mountain, and its name became Allerheiligen-Berg (all saints' mountain), the ancestor of its present name.

== Geography and geology ==
The Heiligenberg is a low sandstone mountain, with a highest elevation of 439.9 metres (1,443 ft), on the western edge of the Odenwald where it meets the Bergstraße Route and the Upper Rhine Plain. It lies north of the Michaelsberg (375.5 metres or 1,232 feet), and on the other side of the Neckar the Königstuhl rises above the old town of Heidelberg. The west and south sides of the Heiligenberg, facing the plain and the Neckar valley, are steep. On the north side the Kerb valley, through which flows a stream called the Rombach or Mühlbach, lies between the Heiligenberg and the Hoher Nistler; to the north-east a ridge connects the Heiligenberg to the Weißer Stein.

The mountain rises above the Heidelberg neighbourhoods of Neuenheim and Handschuhsheim. The Philosophers' Way leads up the mountain from Neuenheim for about 2 kilometres (1.2 mi).

== History ==
The Heiligenberg offers a good view of the plain and the river valley and offers a defensive position. Archaeological investigations have taken place there several times since 1881, including in the 1920s and 1930s during the building of a guest house and the Nazi-era Thingstätte; finds of Neolithic linear pottery show it was inhabited as early as 5500–5100 BCE. Celts settled there beginning in the first half of the first millennium BCE and constructed a double-walled hill fort around the primary and secondary peak. (The water source for this Celtic settlement, known as the Bittersbrunnen, was restored in 1979/80.)

The mountain was already being mined for iron ore in the early La Tène period. The settlement was the political, religious and cultural centre of the region from the 5th century BCE until about 200 BCE, when the centre of political power shifted to the Roman settlement of Lopodunum, now Ladenburg.

Under the Romans there was a sacred precinct on the mountain: the foundations of a north-orientated temple to Mercury, with an apse, can be seen in the nave of the now ruined medieval basilica of St. Michael. Philipp Melanchthon studied Roman inscriptions there in 1508. Archaeological finds include votive stones with Latin inscriptions to Mercurius Cimbrianus, "Mercury of the Cimbri", suggesting a place of worship of the Germanic god Wodan, who was identified with Mercury by interpretatio romana. The Roman shrine was plundered in the Migration Age, but cultic use of the site appears to have continued until approximately 600 CE, since burials were made there until then.

The Heiligenberg has sometimes been identified with the Mons Piri mentioned by Ammianus Marcellinus, where in 369 forces of the Roman Emperor Valentinian I dug trenches but were repulsed by Germanic tribesmen. There are isolated finds from the 4th and 5th centuries, and the mountain was then resettled in the late 6th century. Demonstrably Christian burials appear there by the late 7th century, and in the 8th century, during the Carolingian period, stone buildings were erected over the Roman shrine. They may have been for the use of the king's representatives.

In the 9th century, Lorsch Abbey built the first church there, on the main peak, incorporating Roman construction; it was dedicated to Michael the archangel. The first written mention of the Heiligenberg, as "Aberinesberg", dates to around 870, when abbot Thiotroch of Lorsch Abbey founded a monastery at the site of a former Carolingian royal estate. The church was first mentioned in 890/1.

Ruins of an early Romanesque church survive; the east end dates to the late 10th century and the western sections to c. 1030. The Monastery of St. Michael was founded there in 1023, attributed to Abbot Regimbald. In 1090 a monk named Arnold established a shrine on the lower summit, and a second monastery dedicated to St Stephen, a provostship, was founded there in 1094. A noblewoman called Hazecha was buried there in 1100; her gravestone is the oldest known medieval inscription in Heidelberg. In the mid-13th century the two monasteries were transferred from Lorch to the Archbishopric of Mainz and in 1265 the Benedictines there were replaced by Premonstratensians from All Saints' Abbey in the Black Forest, after which the name was changed to Allerheiligen-Berg (all saints' mountain), the ancestor of its present name. The political conflict concerning the archdiocese resulted in the destruction of the church in 1460, and the tower at the north end collapsed in 1503. Jakob Micyllus described the Monastery of St. Michael as a ruin in 1537, and the oldest depiction of it, by Matthäus Merian in his Topographia Palatinatus of 1645, shows it in ruins, but with most of the walls and the crossing tower still standing.

At the Reformation, in 1555, the Count Palatine took possession of both monasteries. In 1589, St. Stephen's was bestowed on Heidelberg University; the Senate decided to raze it and sell the stones.

Since 2012 Heiligenberg has been protected from excavation by the state of Baden-Württemberg.

== Structures and remains of structures on the Heiligenberg ==
=== Celtic hill fort ===
There are traces of a double-walled Celtic hill fort constructed in the 4th century BCE.

=== Heidenloch ===
The so-called Heidenloch (heathen hole) is a pit 55 metres (180 ft) deep, of unknown age and purpose. It has been suggested that it is a Roman well or cistern.

=== Monastery of St. Michael and traces of Roman temple ===
The ruins of the basilica church of the Monastery of St. Michael, built in 1023, are on the primary summit. Within the nave are traces of the Roman temple of Mercury.

=== Monastery of St. Stephen ===
The ruins of the Monastery of St. Stephen, built at the end of the 11th century, are on the lower summit.

=== Heiligenberg Tower ===
The Heiligenberg Tower was built in the 19th century as a lookout tower, using stones from the Monastery of St. Stephen.

=== Bismarck Tower ===
The Bismarck Tower was built in 1903 as a monument to Otto von Bismarck. It is one of the Bismarck towers constructed after Wilhelm Kreis' design, intended to have a flame lit at the top. It is on the south slope of the Heiligenberg overlooking the Philosophers' Way.

=== Thingstätte ===
During the Third Reich, the Heidelberg Thingstätte open-air theatre was constructed in 1934/5 on the ridge between the Heiligenberg and the Michaelsberg as part of the Thingspiel movement. It is once more in use as a venue for open-air events.
