= Markus Bähr =

German footballer (born 1974)

Personal information
- Date of birth: 10 September 1974 (age 52)
- Place of birth: Dossenheim
- Height: 1.76 m (5 ft 9 in)
- Position: Midfielder

Senior career*
| Years | Team | Apps | (Gls) |
| 1992–1998 | Karlsruher SC | 34 | (1) |
| 1998–2000 | 1. FC Köln | 26 | (1) |
| 2000–2001 | SC Pfullendorf | 6 | (0) |
| Total | | 66 | (2) |

Managerial career
- 2012–2013: Jahn Regensburg (assistant)
- 2014–2015: 1. FFC 08 Niederkirchen
- * Club domestic league appearances and goals

Markus Bähr (born 10 September 1974) is a German former professional footballer who played as a midfielder.
