= Dossenheim =

Dossenheim Dossene (local dialect)
- Municipality
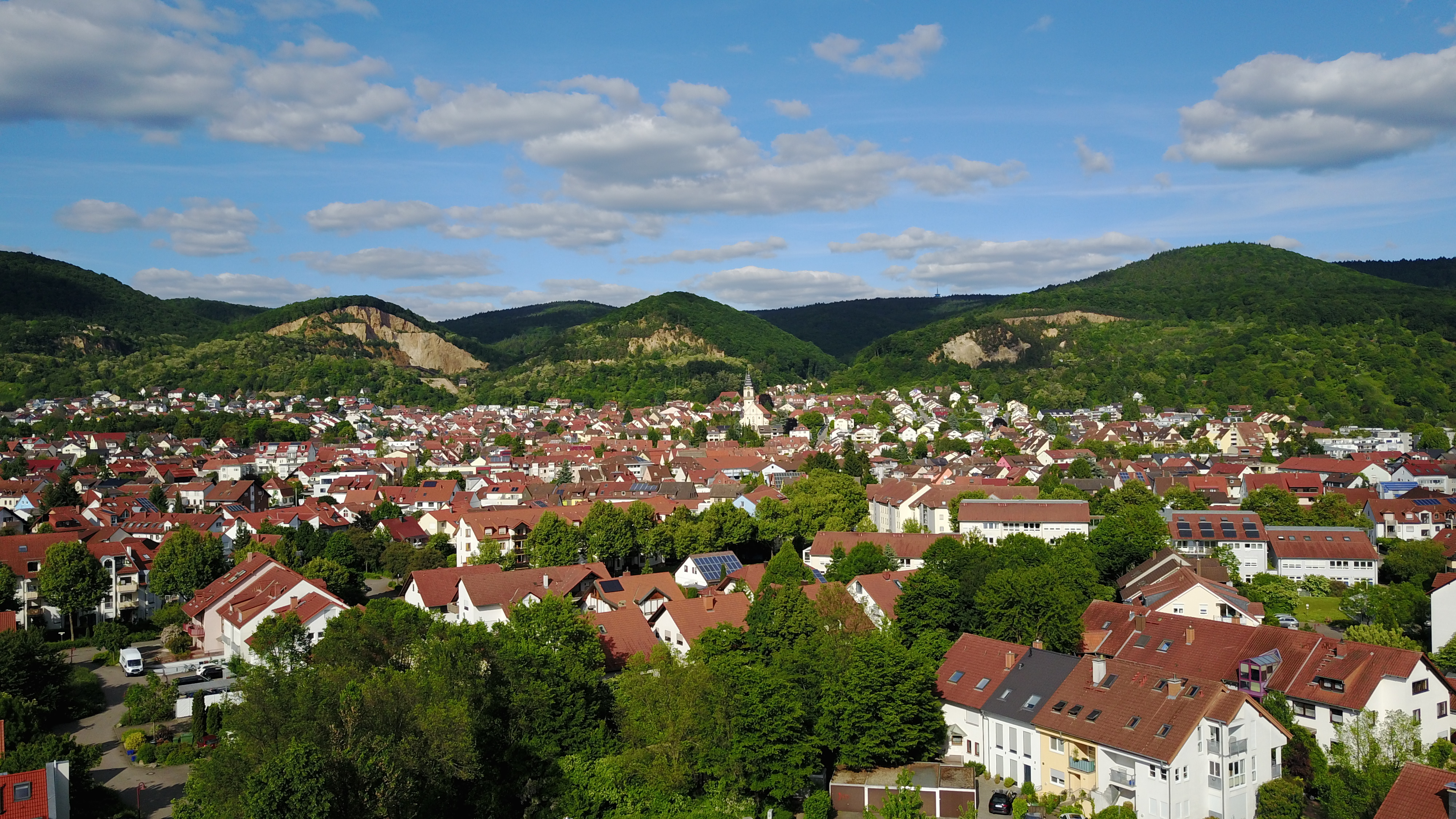

- Coat of arms

- Location of Dossenheim within Rhein-Neckar-Kreis district
- Interactive map of Dossenheim
- Location within Germany Location within Baden-Württemberg
- Coordinates: 49°27′N 8°40′E
- Country: Germany
- State: Baden-Württemberg
- Admin. region: Karlsruhe
- District: Rhein-Neckar-Kreis
- First mentioned: 766 (Lorscher Codex)
- Subdivisions: Town with hamlet

Government
  - Mayor (2019–27): David Faulhaber (CDU)

Area
  - Total: 14.15 km^{2} (5.46 sq mi)
- Elevation: 153 m (502 ft)

Population (2025-12-31)
  - Total: 12,702
  - Density: 897.7/km^{2} (2,325/sq mi)
- Time zone: UTC+01:00 (CET)
  - Summer (DST): UTC+02:00 (CEST)
- Postal codes: 69125-69221
- Dialling codes: 06221
- Vehicle registration: HD
- Website: www.dossenheim.de

Dossenheim (German pronunciation: [ˈdɔsn̩ˌhaɪ̯m]; Palatine German: Dossene) is a municipality in the Rhein-Neckar-Kreis (district) in Baden-Württemberg, Germany.

It is located on Bergstraße (which is the reason it is occasionally called "Dossenheim and der Bergstraße" e.g. on the municipalities website) and the Bertha Benz Memorial Route.

== Geography ==
=== Location ===
Dossenheim lies 5 kilometers north of Heidelberg (or 0 km, as both border each other) along the Bergstraße at the foot of the Odenwald. Dossenheim borders Heidelberg, Ladenburg, and Schriesheim.

=== Boroughs ===
The hamlet Schwabenheim (which borders the Neckar river) belongs to Dossenheim.

== History ==
Dossenheim was first mentioned in the Lorsch codex in 766. 1130 is the first mention of the noble family Wolfsölden-Schauenburg, who ruled the area from the Schauenburg. After this family died out in 1280, the inheritors sold the lands to the electors of the Palatinate of the Rhine of Heidelberg in 1303. As early as 1319, the prince-elector archbishopric of Mainz had won all the rights that the fief of Schaenberg had pawned to the knights of Handschuhsheim. After a long period of rivalry between the Archbishop of Mainz and the Palatinate of the Rhine, until Frederick I conquered the area for the Palatinate and destroyed the Schauenburg.

In the Landshut War of Succession, the Hessian landgrave destroyed Dossenheim in 1504. During the Thirty Years' War Tilly's troops, more than others, destroyed and plundered Dossenheim in 1622. After seizing the capital Heidelberg, Dossenheim belonged to the Archbishop of Mainz for a short time. However, as part of the Bergstrasse Cease-fire of 1650, Dossenheim was returned to the Palatinate. In the Dutch War and in the War of the Grand Alliance French troops set fire to numerous buildings in 1674, 1689, and 1693.

In 1714, Lothar Franz von Schönborn, the archbishop of Mainz renounced all claims to Dossenheim forever. In 1803 the Palatinate was dissolved and Dossenheim became part of Baden. In 1925 Schwabenheim was annexed to Dossenheim.

== Government ==
=== Municipal council ===
The council of Dossenheim has 22 members elected by direct suffrage for five years, in addition to the presiding mayor. The seat distribution after the local elections of 2024 (compared to 2019) is as follows:

Municipal Council 2024
Party	Votes	Seats
Green	26,3% (-8,6)	6 (-2)
CDU	21,8% (-0,9)	5 (±0)
FW Dossenheim	21,0% (+3,2)	4 (±0)
SPD	14,3% (-1,7)	3 (±0)
Die Linke	8,9% (+8,9)	2 (+2)
FDP	7,7% (-0,9)	2 (±0)
Voter participation: 73.5% (+2.0)

=== Mayor ===
The Mayor is elected by direct suffrage for a term of eight years. The Mayor of Dossenheim is David Faulhaber (CDU).

- 1963–1979 Heinrich Schumacher
- 1979–1995 Peter Denger
- 1995-2019 Hans Lorenz (CDU).
- since 2019 David Faulhaber (CDU).

=== Coat of arms ===
The coat of arms comes from a court seal from the year 1495 upon which appeared a grape vine. In 1901 it was officially awarded by the General State Archive.

The flag is green and white. The date it was chosen is unknown.

=== Sister cities ===
- Le Grau du Roi, France

== Culture and sights ==
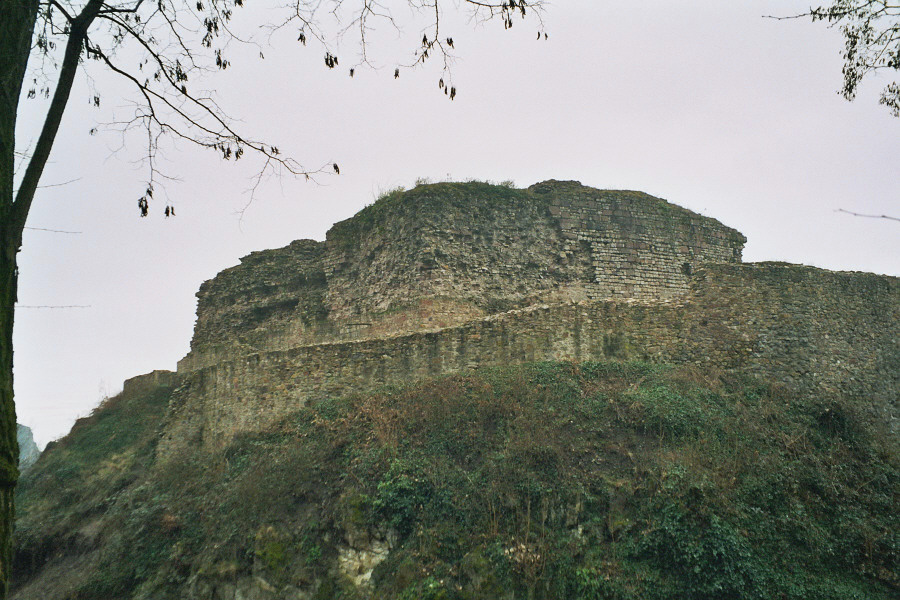
The ruins of Schauenburg in Dossenheim

Local attractions include an indoor swimming pool and a little shopping center in the area Am Petrus.

Dossenheim's Kermesse (Kerwe) occurs on the third Sunday in September every year. In Dossenheimer tradition this is a street festival.

Dossenheim's location in the Rhine river flood plain at the edge of the Odenwald, offers a variety of landscapes. The agricultural landscape of the flood plain climbs steeps from 110 m above sea level through the forests of the Odenwald to 548 m at the top of the Weißer Stein (White Stone). The Weißer Stein is the site of a lookout tower made of sandstone and a broadcast tower (not the broadcast tower of SWR). The ruins of the Schauenberg to the North, offer a view over the flood plain. When the air is clear, one can see the Hambacher Schloss in the Palatinian forest and the cities of Mannheim, Ludwigshafen, Speyer, and Karlsruhe. Abandoned Porphyry quarries can be found in the wooded areas. In the Spring, fruit trees blossom white and red.

=== Museums ===
Dossenheim has a museum of local history.

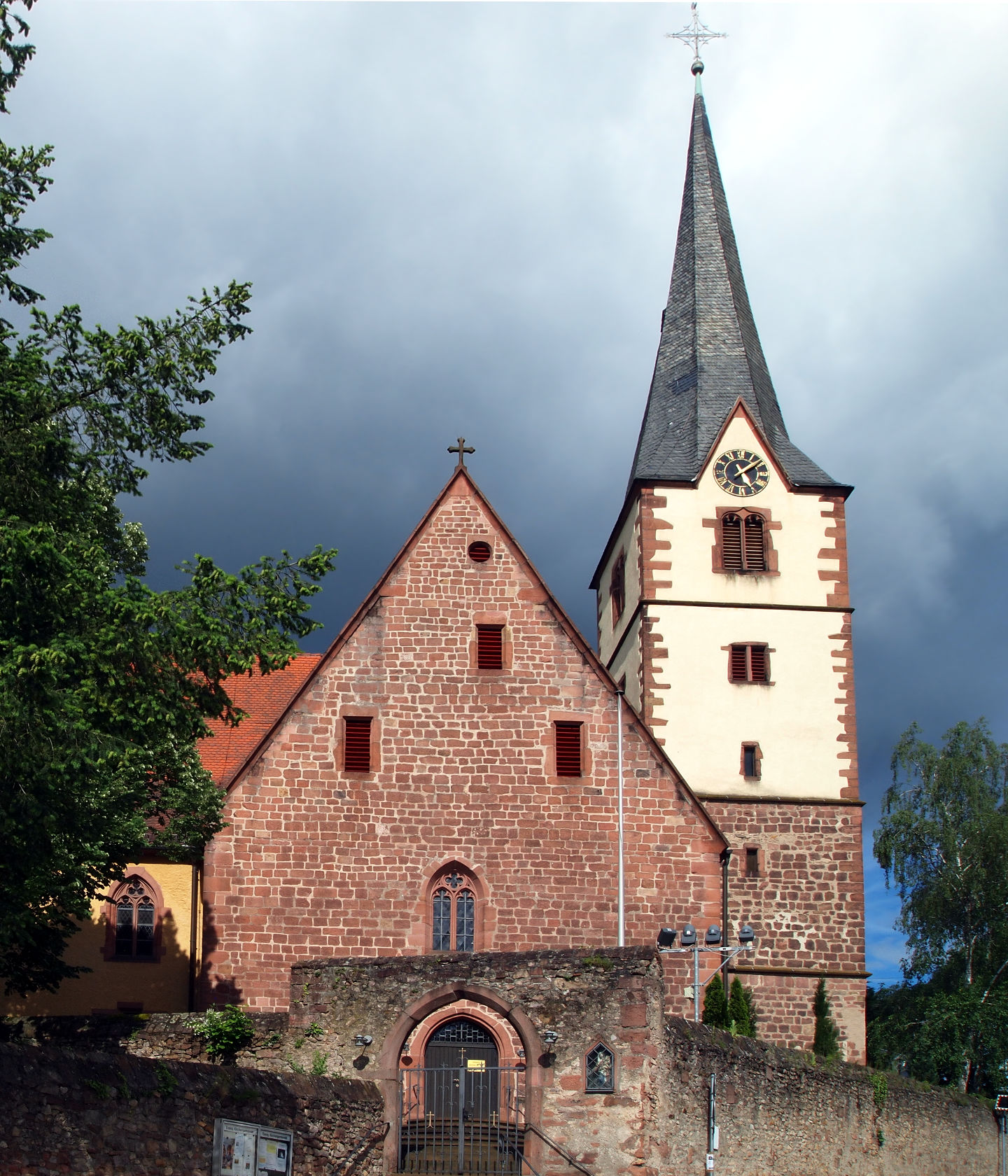
Church from 15th century, extended 1931

=== Notable buildings and edifices ===
- Ruins of Schauenburg
- Television broadcast tower atop the Weißer Stein
- Historic city hall (houses the museum of local history)
- Locks on the river Neckar at Schwabenheim (a difference of 8.7 m in height)
- Lookout tower on the Weißer Stein
- Preparation facilities and parts of the overhead tramway for goods in the porphyry quarry Vatter
- Skatepark
- Former mediumwave broadcast tower of the SWR. In Dossenheim SWR operated a mediumwave broadcast tower until 30 April 2004 for the frequency 711 kHz with a broadcast power of 5 kilowatts. Together with broadcast towers Heilbronn-Obereisesheim and Ulm-Jungingen it formed a single-frequency network. This facility has been taken down in the meantime.

=== Regular events ===
- Dossenheimer Sommertagszug (summer day parade) in May
- Kermesse on the 3rd Sunday in September
- Christmas market in December on the Kronenburger Hof

== Economy and infrastructure ==
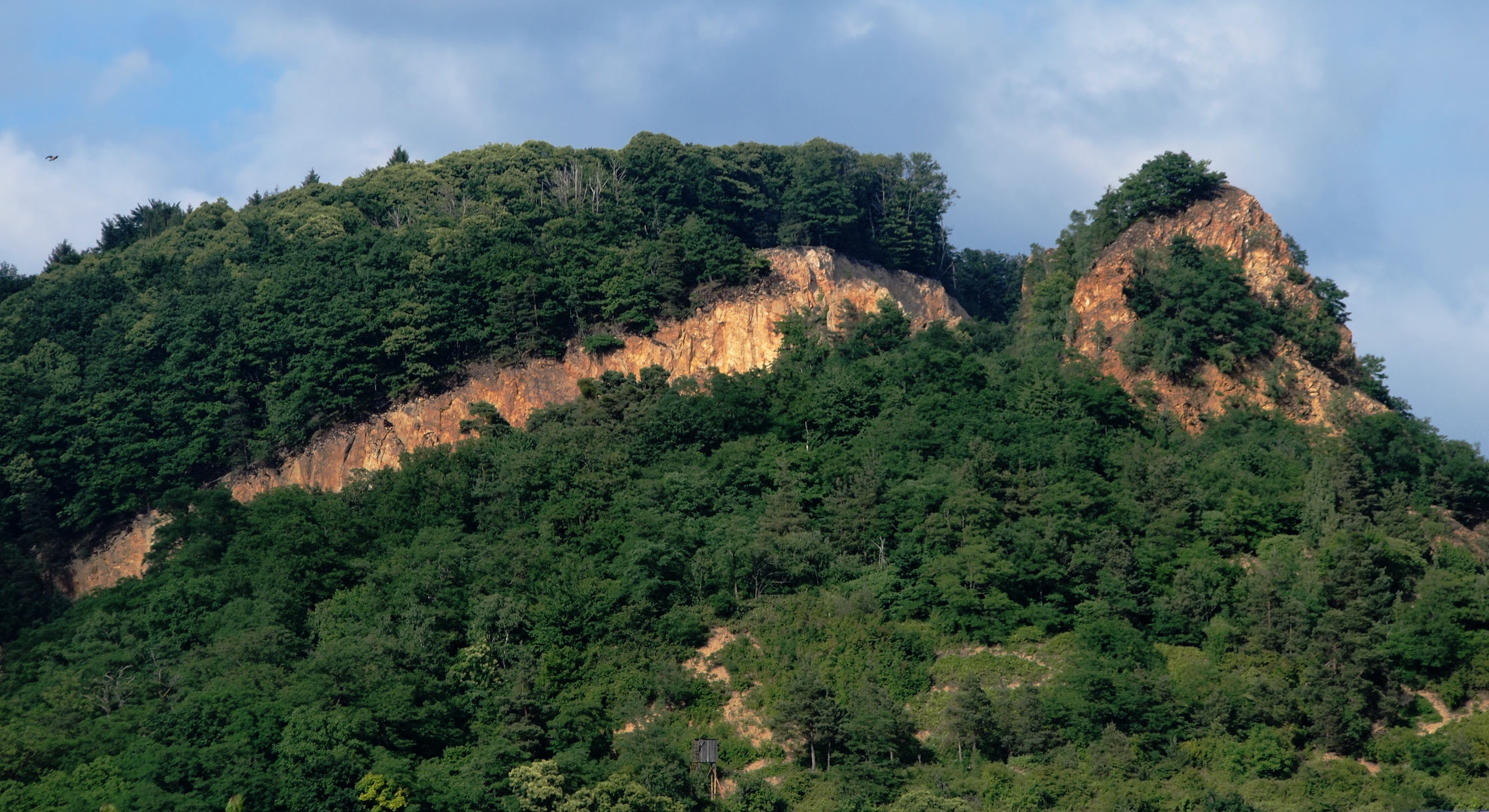
Traces of mining

Dossenheim is primarily a residential community. Because of its proximity to Heidelberg, Dossenheim is attractive to people who work at the Ruprecht Karl University of Heidelberg, German Cancer Research Center (Deutsches Krebsforschungszentrum DKFZ) or scientific companies (located in Heidelberg Technology Park). There is limited industry and commerce in Dossenheim. Dossenheim has a history of being a stone mining village. In Dossenheim there were 2 large quarries. The raw porphyry would be transported to the transfer station with a tramway that has since been dismantled. The stone was used primarily for construction of water projects (hydraulic engineering) and road construction. Both quarries have fallen into disuse. The scars can be seen far into the flood plain of the Rhine. Theres a site of Evonik that operates production facilities.

=== Transport ===
Dossenheim is on the A 5 as well as the federal highway B 3. The Upper Rhine Railway (Oberrheinische Eisenbahn, OEG), now part of Rhein-Neckar-Verkehr (RNV) GmbH, connects Dossenheim to the metropolitan centers nearby: Mannheim, Heidelberg and Weinheim. Dossenheim has 3 light rail stops: Dossenheim-Nord, Dossenheim OEG-Bahnhof and Dossenheim-Süd.

=== Government offices and institutions ===
- Freiwillige Feuerwehr Dossenheim (volunteer fire department)
- Biologische Bundesanstalt für Land- und Forstwirtschaft (BBA) (Federal Biological Institute for Agriculture and Forestry)

=== Clubs ===
- Angelsportverein ( fishing club )
- Bertha Benz Memorial Club e.V.
- Bertha Benz Memorial Route e.V.
- Biblisches Lebenszentrum Dossenheim e.V. (pentecostal church)
- Boule- Club ( Boule club)
- Cantus Vivus Konzertchor ( concert choir )
- Deutsches Rotes Kreuz (DRK) - OV Dossenheim (Deutsches Rotes Kreuz)
- DJK Dossenheim
- DLRG Dossenheim
- Dossema Bannweidbuwe ( Dossenheim Kermesse club)
- FC Dossenheim ( Football (soccer) club )
- Musikkapelle der katholischen Pfarrgemeinde Dossenheim e.V. (brass orchestra)
- Musikverein 1893. e.V. Dossenheim
- Schützenverein ( Gun Club )
- TSG Germania ( sports club including Handball and children's gymnastics )
- Verein zur Pflege der Livemusik

== Notable natives ==
- Charly Körbel, professional soccer player (Eintracht Frankfurt)
- Markus Bähr, professional soccer player (1.FC Köln, Karlsruher SC)
- Otto Hitzfeld, " Der Löwe von Sewastopol "
