= Weißer Stein =

Hill in the Odenwald

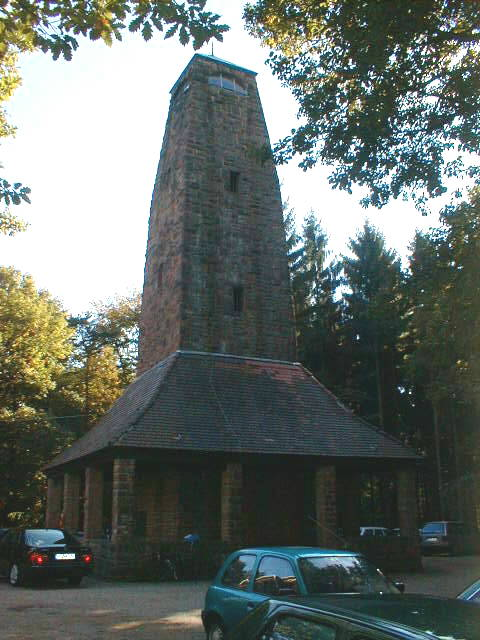
- Lookout tower on Weißer Stein

Highest point
- Elevation: 548 m (1,798 ft)
- Coordinates: 49°27′13″N 8°43′24″E

Naming
- English translation: White stone
- Language of name: German
- Pronunciation: German: [ˈvaɪsɐ ˈʃtaɪn]

Geography
- Location within Baden-Württemberg
- Location: Baden-Württemberg, Germany
- Parent range: Odenwald

Weißer Stein is the name of a 548-metre (1,798 ft) high hill in Germany, located in the Odenwald, north of Heidelberg and east of Dossenheim.

On Weißer Stein is a 20 m tall lookout tower. It was built in 1906 by the members of the Odenwald club. In good weather other high mountains of the Odenwald can be seen, such as Melibokus, Katzenbuckel, Tromm and Neunkircher Höhe. Near the tower is the Höhengaststätte Weißer Stein tavern with a beer garden.

Nearby is the 108 m (354 ft) tall broadcast tower of the Deutsche Telekom AG (German telephone company) and an additional antenna mast. The broadcast tower is a Type 11.

Coordinates:

- Lookout tower: 8°43'23" East, 49°27'11" North
- Broadcast tower: 8°43'26" East, 49°27'15" North
- Antenna mast: 8°43'17" East, 49°27'10" North
