= Mercurius Cimbrianus =

Mercury god of Germanic tribe of Cimbri

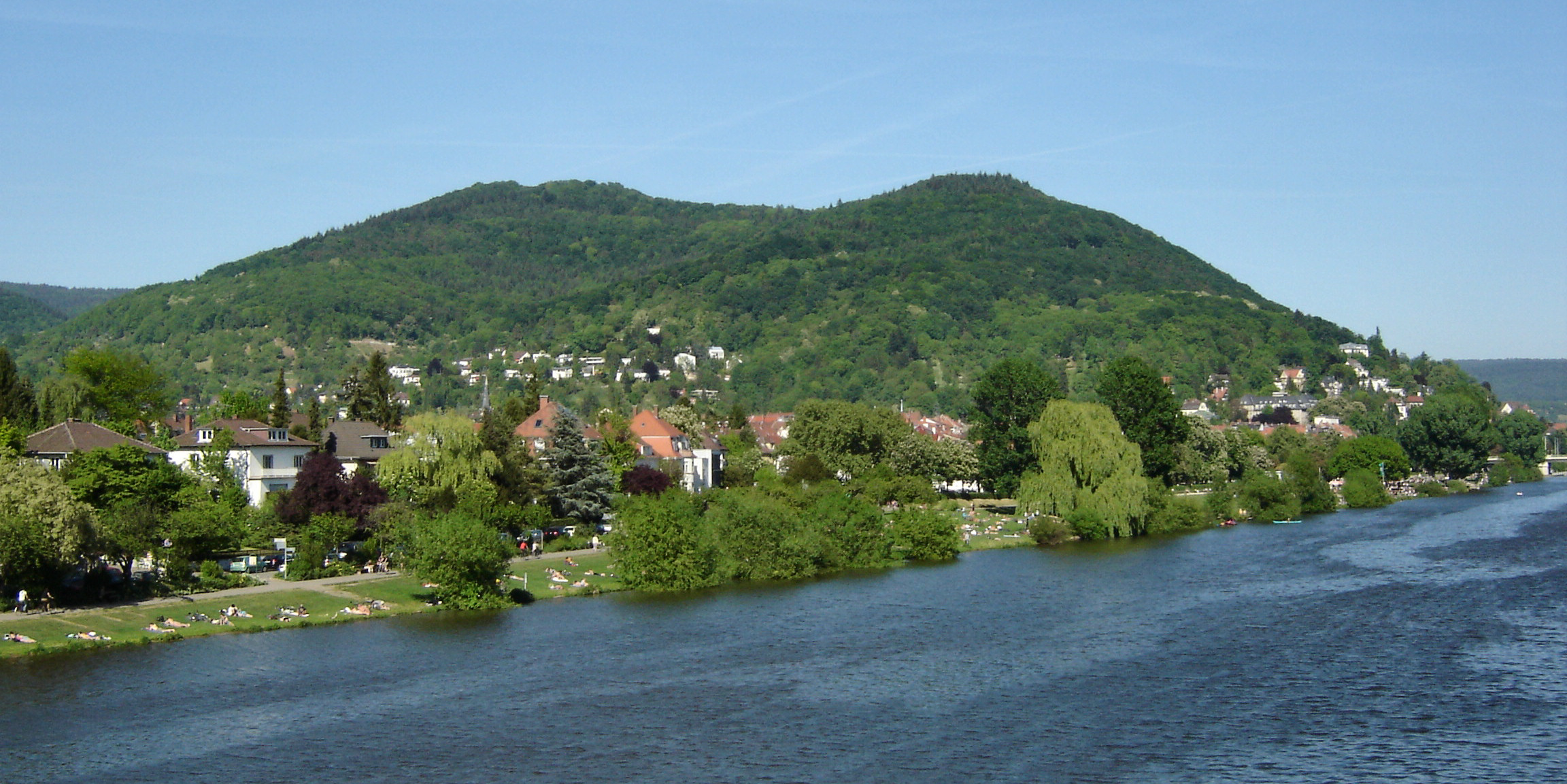
The Heiligenberg near present-day Heidelberg, where three inscriptions to Mercury Cimbrianus were found

Mercurius Cimbrianus or Cimbrius is a Germanic god mentioned in seven Roman dedicatory inscriptions. These inscriptions are from the territory of the Roman province of Germania Superior from the second to third centuries CE.

Three inscriptions were found in a Roman cult complex on the Heiligenberg, near present-day Heidelberg, which was used until late Antiquity. Two finds from the vicinity of Miltenberg and two inscriptions from near Mogontiacum (present-day Mainz) make up the remainder of the documentation on this god.

The name ‘Cimbrianus’ is derived from that of the Germanic tribe of Cimbri, whose homeland is placed in the Jutland peninsula by ancient sources such as Strabo and Tacitus, and who began migrating southward in the late 2nd century BCE. From this it has been conjectured that the cult of Mercurius Cimbrianus was established in the Odenwald by some detachments of such Cimbri. Also near Miltenberg, another inscription mentions the presence of Teutons, who were associated with the Cimbri in their great 2nd-century BCE migration. As the god is identified with the Roman Mercury, this ‘Mercury of the Cimbri’ is generally thought to represent the Germanic god Odin or *Wōđanaz.

== Literature ==
- Kauffmann, Friedrich [in German] (1909). "Mercurius Cimbrianus". Zeitschrift für deutsche Philologie. 38: 289–297.
- Gutenbrunner, Siegfried (1936). Germanische Götternamen der antiken Inschriften. Halle an der Saale: Niemeyer. p. 52ff.
