= Monastery of St. Michael (Heidelberg) =

Coordinates: 49°25′33″N 8°42′22″E

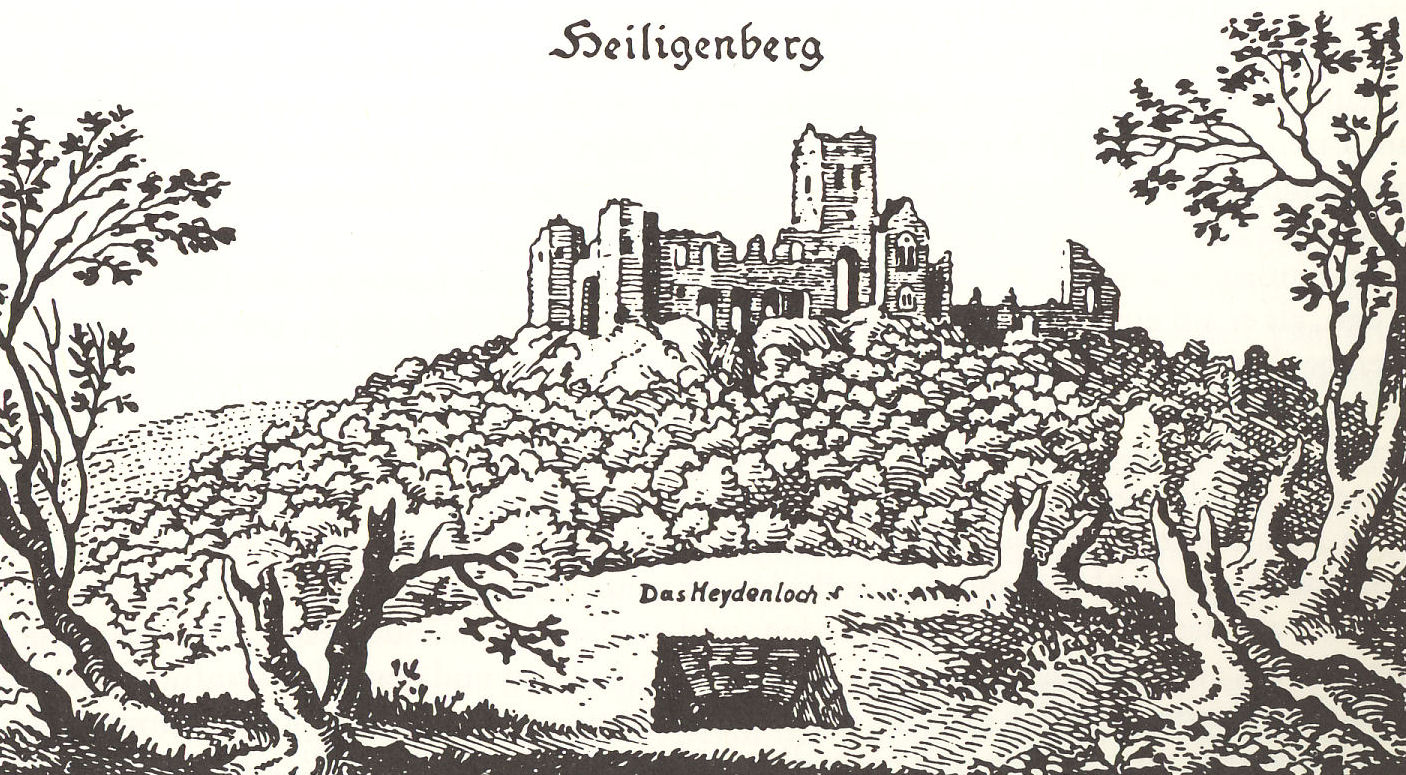
Monastery of St. Michael on the Heiligenberg in 1645, by Matthäus Merian

The Monastery of St. Michael German: Michaelskloster, on the Heiligenberg (Saints' Mountain) in Heidelberg, was a branch of the nearby Lorsch Abbey. The ruined complex that can be seen today was built beginning in 1023. The monastery was occupied successively by several religious orders before it was abandoned in the 16th century.

The first mention of the monastery is in the Lorsch codex, from the 12th century, which dates the founding of the monastery to 870. No remains of an earlier monastery have been found, so this might have been merely an estimate of the founding.

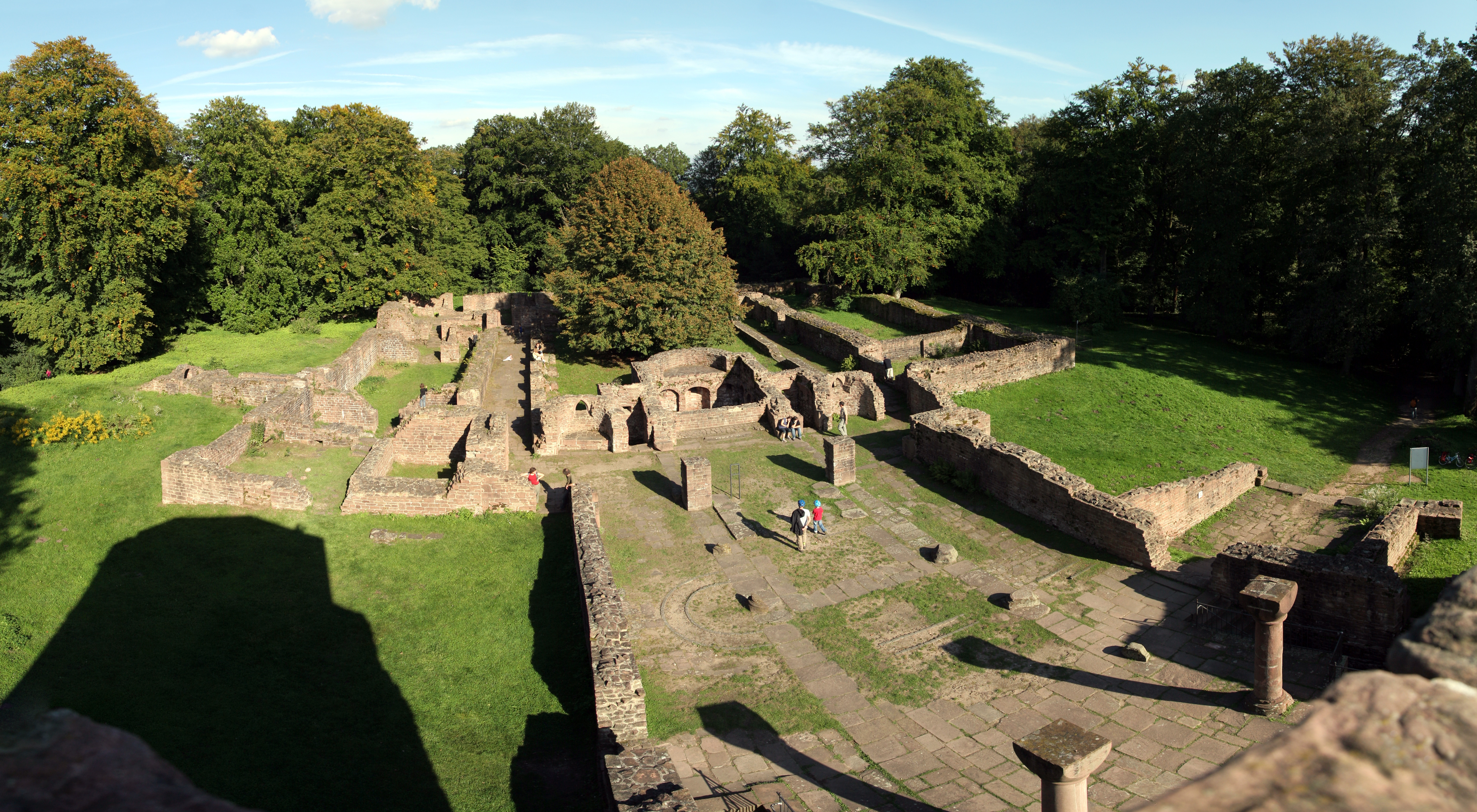
View from the west tower of the monastery ruins.

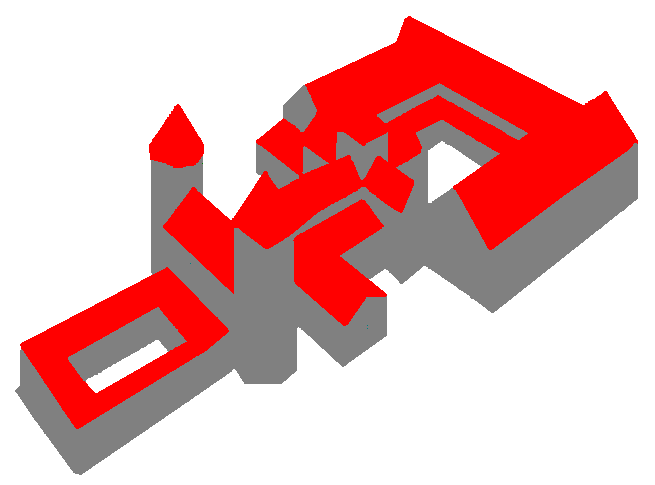
Reconstruction

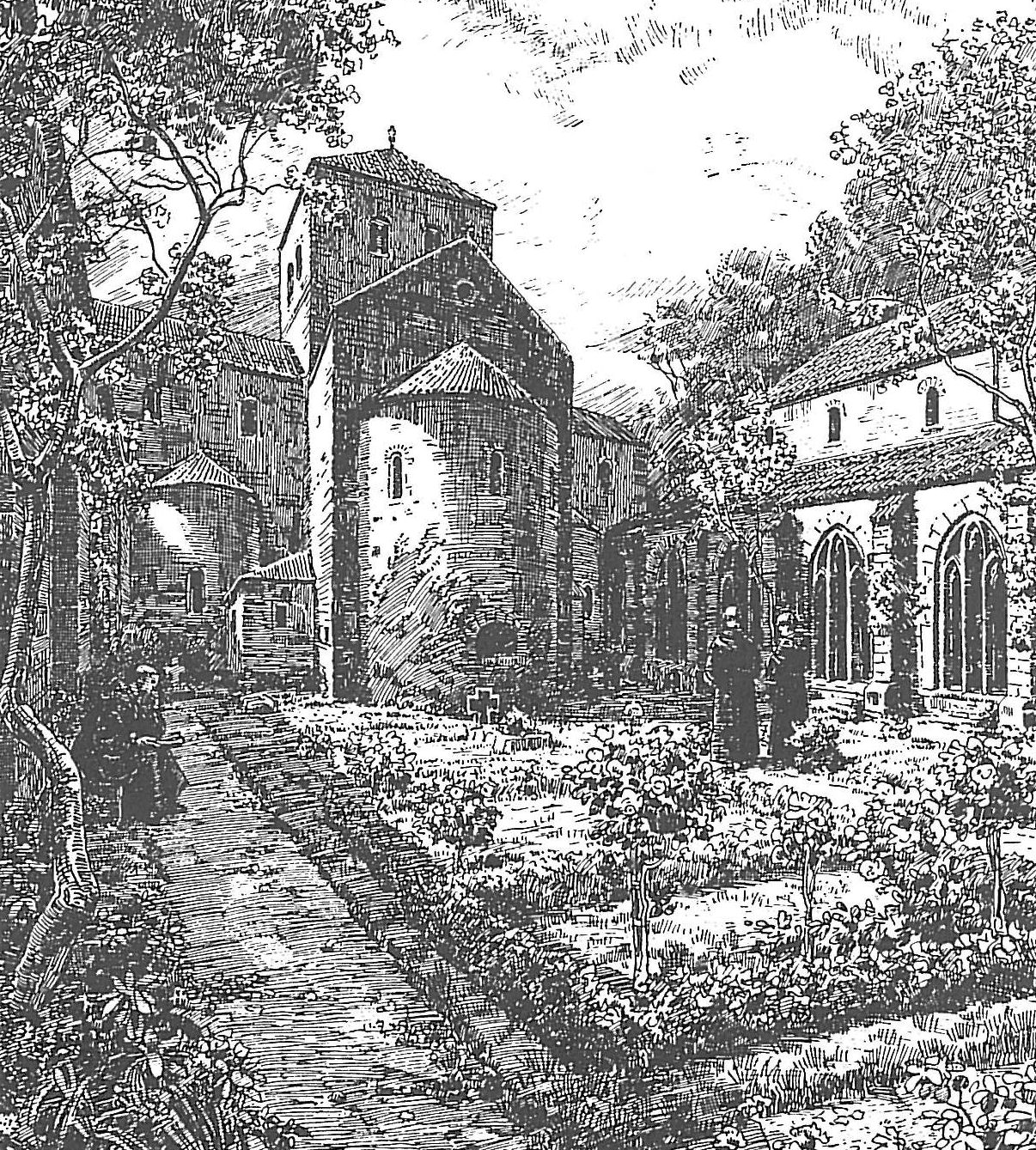
Monastery garden, by Heinrich Hoffmann
