= Hoher Nistler =

Coordinates: 49°26′41″N 8°42′25″E

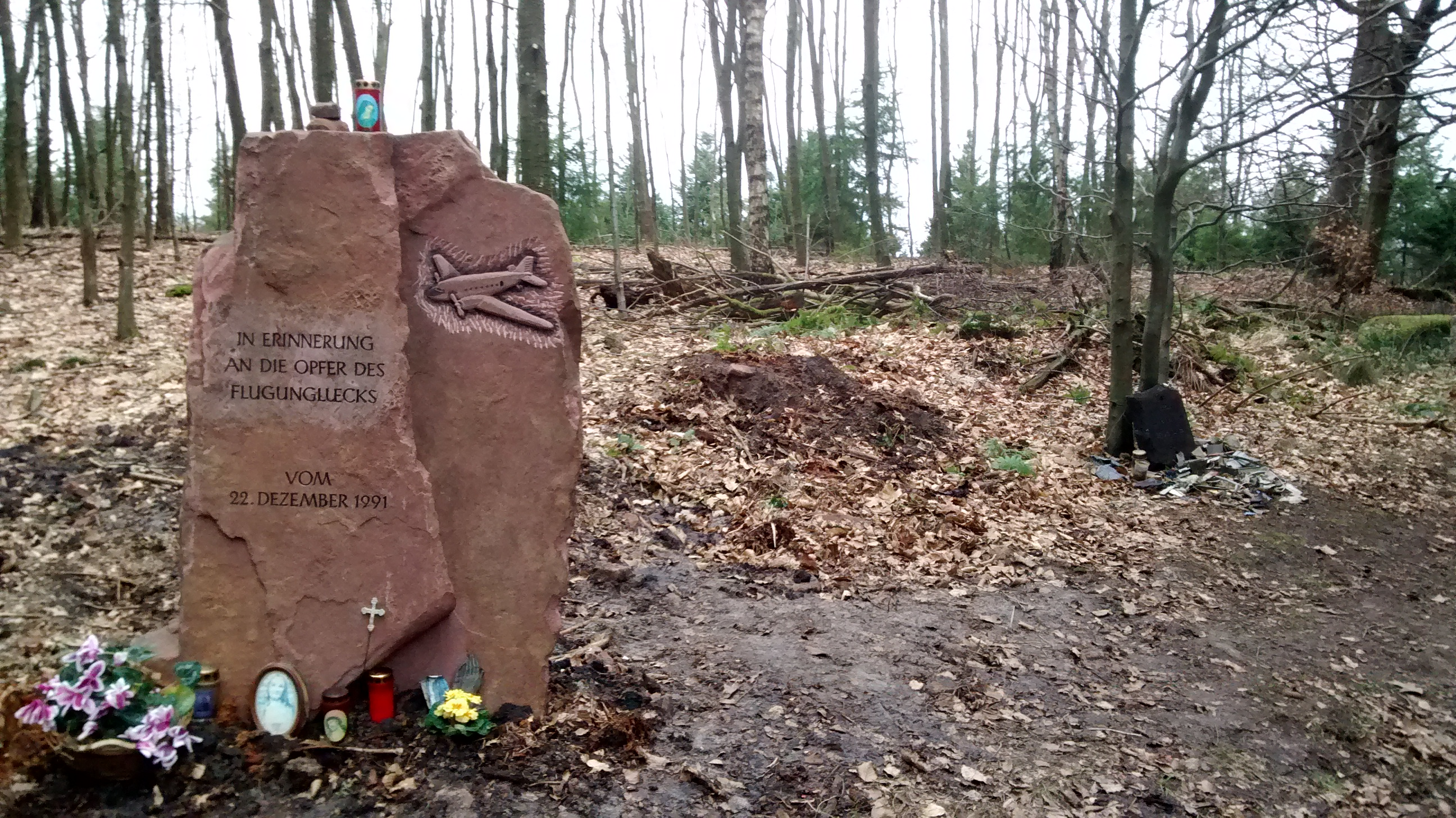
- Memorial stone to the 1991 plane crash at Hohen Nistler

Highest point
- Elevation: 496 m (1,627 ft)

Geography
- Location: Baden-Württemberg, Germany

Hoher Nistler is a mountain of Baden-Württemberg, Germany.
