= History of Heidelberg University =

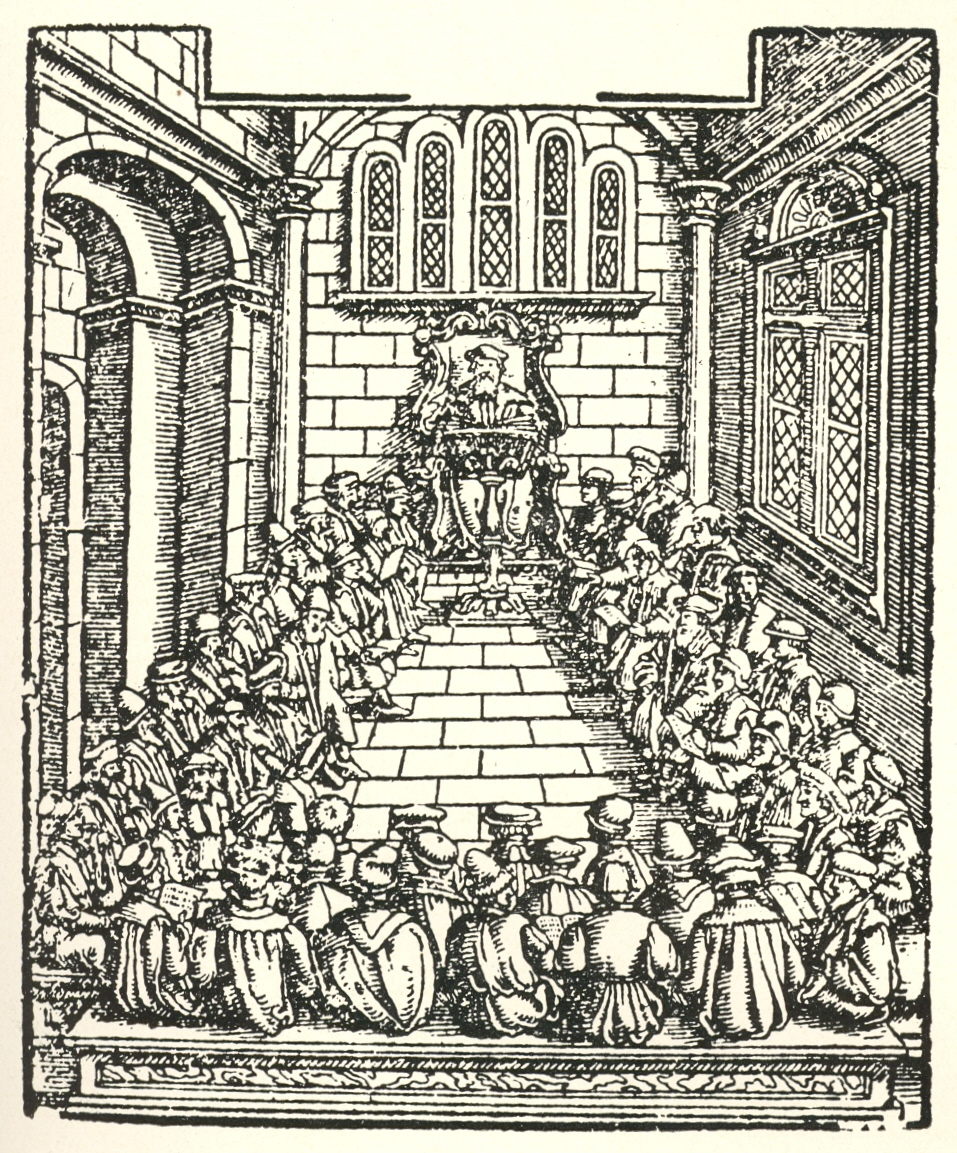
Hohe Schul zu Heydelberg. Heidelberg University, woodprint from Cosmographia universalis of Sebastian Münster, 1550.

The history of Heidelberg University starts from its founding in 1386.

== Founding ==
Around 1400, the city of Heidelberg had approximately 3,000 inhabitants, but the Great Schism in 1378, which split European Christendom into two hostile groups made it possible for this relatively small city to get its own university.

The Great Schism was initiated by the election of two popes after the death of Pope Gregory XI in the same year. One successor resided in Avignon (elected by the French) and the other in Rome (elected by the Italian cardinals). The German secular and spiritual leaders voiced their support for the successor in Rome, which had far-reaching consequences for the German students and teachers in Paris: they lost their stipends and had to leave.

Rupert I recognized the opportunity and initiated talks with the Curia, which ultimately led to the creation of the papal bull for the foundation of a university. After having received on October 23, 1385, the permission from pope Urban VI to create a school of general studies (Latin: studium generale), the final decision to found the university was taken on June 26, 1386, at the behest of Rupert I, Count Palatine of the Rhine. As specified in the papal charter, the university was modelled after University of Paris and included four faculties: philosophy, theology, jurisprudence, and medicine.

On October 18, 1386, a special Pontifical High Mass in the Heiliggeistkirche commemorated the opening of the doors of the university. On October 19, 1386, the first lecture was held, making Heidelberg the oldest university in Germany. In November 1386, Marsilius of Inghen was elected first rector of the university. As a motto for the seal, he chose semper apertus—i.e., "the book of learning is always open."

The university grew up quickly and in March 1390, 185 students were enrolled at the university

== Early development ==
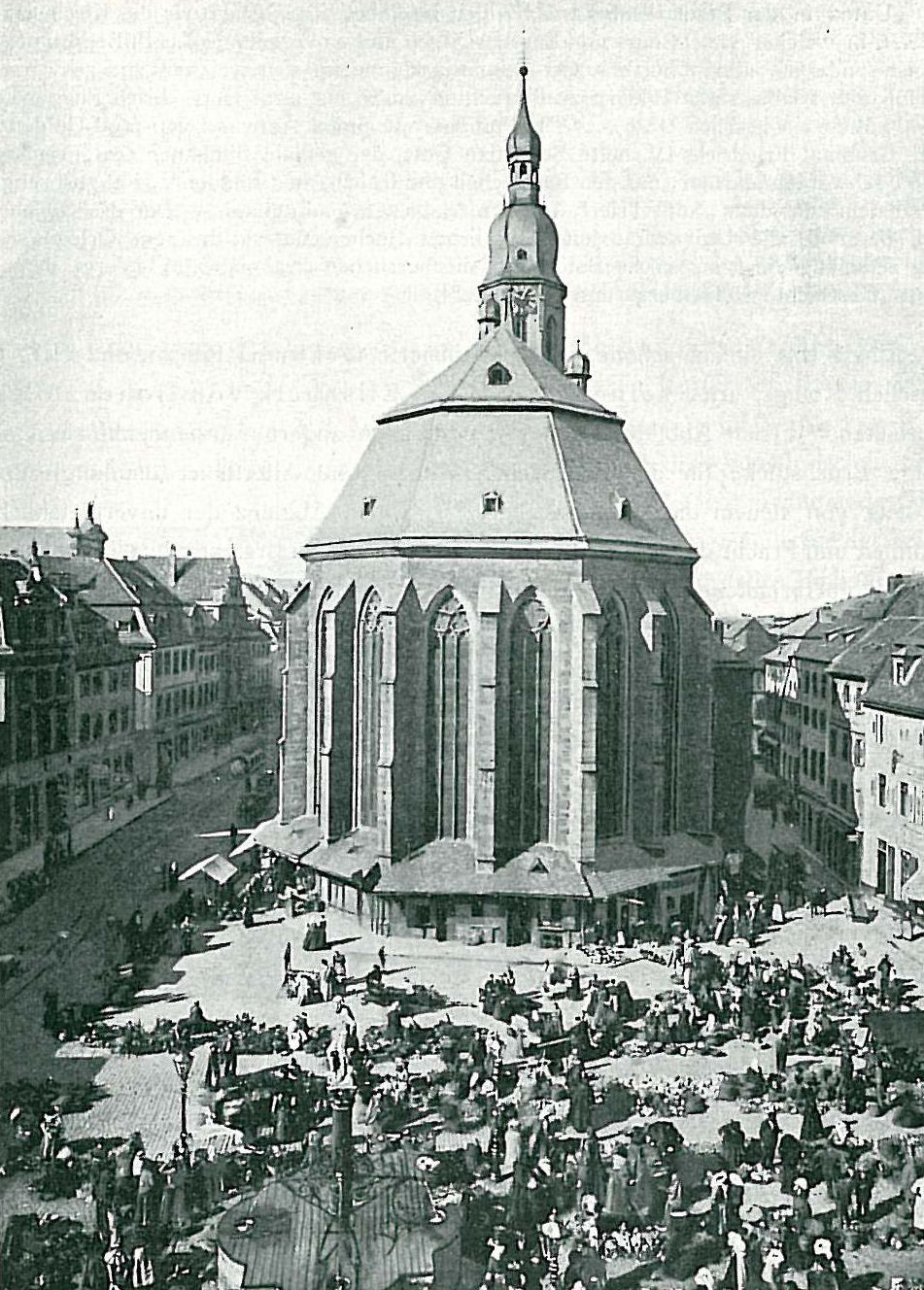
A solemn holy Mass was offered in the Heiliggeistkirche in 1386 to commemorate and bless the establishment of the University (photo ca. 1900).

The newly created university acted from the outset as an intellectual center for theology and jurisprudence scholars from throughout the Holy Roman Empire. Nominalism had been prevalent from the time of Marsilius until after 1406, when Jerome of Prague, the friend of John Hus, introduced realism at Heidelberg, on which account he was expelled by the faculty. Six years later, the teachings of John Wycliffe were also condemned. Between 1414 and 1418, several distinguished professors of Heidelberg University took part in the Council of Constance and acted as counselors for Louis III, who attended this council as representative of the emperor and chief magistrate of the realm, and had John Hus executed as a heretic. In 1432, the university, pursuant to papal and imperial requests, sent two delegates to the Council of Basle who faithfully supported the legitimate pope.

The transition from scholastic to humanistic culture was effected by the chancellor and bishop Johann von Dalberg in the late 15th century. Humanism was represented at Heidelberg University particularly by the founder of the older German Humanistic School Rudolph Agricola, Conrad Celtes, Jakob Wimpfeling, and Johann Reuchlin. Æneas Silvius Piccolomini was chancellor of the university in his capacity of provost of Worms, and later always favored it with his friendship and good-will as Pope Pius II. In 1482, Pope Sixtus IV permitted laymen and married men to be appointed professors in the ordinary of medicine through a papal dispensation. In 1553, Pope Julius III sanctioned the allotment of ecclesiastical benefice to secular professors.

Martin Luther's disputation at Heidelberg in April 1518 made a lasting impact, and his adherents among the masters and scholars soon became leading Reformationists in Southwest Germany. With the Palatinate's turn to the Reformed faith, Otto Henry, Elector Palatine, converted the university into a Calvinist institution. In 1563, the Heidelberg Catechism was created under collaboration of members of the university's divinity school. As the 16th century was passing, the late humanism stepped beside Calvinism as a predominant school of thought; and figures like Paul Schede, Jan Gruter, Martin Opitz, and Matthäus Merian taught at the university. It attracted scholars from all over the continent and developed into a cultural and academic center. However, with the beginning of the Thirty Years' War in 1618, the intellectual and fiscal wealth of the university declined. In 1622, the then-world-famous Bibliotheca Palatina (the library of the university) was stolen from the University Cathedral and taken to Rome. The reconstruction efforts thereafter were defeated by the troops of King Louis XIV, who destroyed Heidelberg in 1693 almost completely.

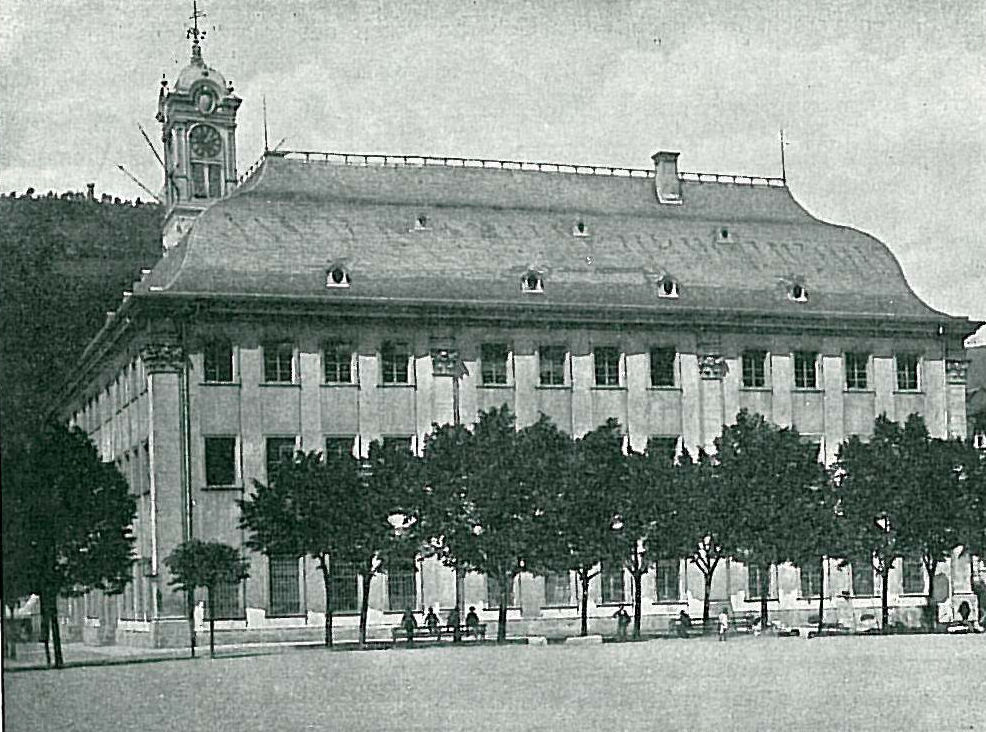
The Old University from 1735 is today the seat of the Rector and the University Senate.

As a consequence of the late Counter-Reformation, the university lost its Protestant character, and was channeled by Jesuits. In 1735, the Old University was constructed at University Square, then known as Domus Wilhelmina. Through the efforts of the Jesuits a preparatory seminary was established, the Seminarium ad Carolum Borromæum, whose pupils were also registered in the university. After the suppression of the Jesuit Order, most of the schools they had conducted passed into the hands of the French Congregation of Lazarists in 1773. They deteriorated from that time forward, and the university itself continued to lose in prestige until the reign of the last elector Charles Theodore, Elector Palatine, who established new chairs for all the faculties, founded scientific institutes such as the Electoral Academy of Science, and transferred the school of political economy from Kaiserslautern to Heidelberg, where it was combined with the university as the faculty of political economy. He also founded an observatory in the neighboring city of Mannheim, where Jesuit Christian Meyer labored as director. In connection with the commemoration of the four hundredth anniversary of the university, a revised statute book, which several of the professors had been commissioned to prepare, was approved by the elector. The financial affairs of the university, its receipts and expenditures, were put in order. At that period, the number of students varied from 300 to 400; in the jubilee year, 133 matriculated. As a consequence of the disturbances caused by the French Revolution, and particularly because of the Treaty of Lunéville, the university lost all its property on the left bank of the Rhine, so that its complete dissolution was expected.

== 19th and early 20th century ==
It was not until 1803 that this decline stopped. In this year, the university was reestablished as a state-owned institution by Karl Friedrich, Grand Duke of Baden, to whom the part of the Palatinate situated on the right bank of the Rhine was allotted. Since then, the university bears his name together with the name of Ruprecht I. Karl Friedrich divided the university into five faculties and placed himself at its head as rector, as did also his successors. During this decade Romanticism found expression in Heidelberg through Clemens Brentano, Achim von Arnim, Ludwig Tieck, Joseph Görres, and Joseph von Eichendorff, and there went forth a revival of the German Middle Ages in speech, poetry, and art. The German Students Association exerted great influence, which was at first patriotic and later political. After Romanticism had eventually died out, Heidelberg became a center of Liberalism and the movement in favor of German national unity. The historians Friedrich Christoph Schlosser and Georg Gottfried Gervinus were the guides of the nation in political history. The modern scientific schools of medicine and natural science, particularly astronomy, were models in point of construction and equipment, and Heidelberg University was especially noted for its influential law school. The university as a whole became the role model for the transformation of American liberal arts colleges into research universities, in particular for the then-newly established Johns Hopkins University. Heidelberg's professors were important supporters of the Vormärz revolution and many of them were members of the first freely elected German parliament, the Frankfurt Parliament of 1848. During the late 19th century, the university housed a very liberal and open-minded spirit, which was deliberately fostered by Max Weber, Ernst Troeltsch and a circle of colleagues around them. In the Weimar Republic, the university was widely recognized as a center of democratic thinking, coined by professors like Karl Jaspers, Gustav Radbruch, Martin Dibelius and Alfred Weber. Unfortunately, there were also dark forces working within the university: Nazi physicist Philipp Lenard was head of the physical institute during that time. Following the assassination of Walther Rathenau, he refused to half mast the national flag on the institute, thereby provoking its storming by communist students.

== Nazi era ==
With the advent of the Third Reich in 1933, the university supported the Nazis like all other German universities at the time. It dismissed a large number of staff and students for political and racist reasons. Many dissident fellows had to emigrate and most Jewish and Communist professors that did not leave Germany were deported. At least two professors directly fell victim to Nazi terror.

On 17 May 1933, members of the university faculty and students took part in book burnings at Universitätsplatz ("University Square") and Heidelberg was eventually infamous as NSDAP university. The inscription above the main entrance of the New University was changed from "The Living Spirit" to "The German Spirit", and many professors paid homage to the new motto. The university was involved in Nazi eugenics : forced sterilizations were carried out at the women's clinic and the psychiatric clinic then directed by Carl Schneider was involved in Action T4 Euthanasia program.

== Since the end of World War II ==
All universities in the American zone were closed. In April 1945, the Counter Intelligence Corps (aka CIC) started investigating on the University Nazi activities and at the same time contributed to set up the "Committee of Thirteen" aiming at the re-opening of the University. This group of professors among which antinazi economist Alfred Weber and philosopher Karl Jaspers prepared a new constitution for the university. Newly laid statutes obliged the university to "The Living Spirit of Truth, Justice and Humanity".

In 1945 and 1946, the university underwent an extensive denazification. Since Heidelberg was spared from destruction during WWII, the reconstruction of the university was realized rather quickly.

Because of their role during the Nazi era, the student corporations (German: Studentenverbindung) were forbidden by the American authorities. These dueling fraternities were not included either in the plans for a democratic university of the Committee of Thirteen. Inspired by the English colleges of Oxford and Cambridge, Professor Karl Heinrich Bauer who would become the first rector after the war, proposed the foundation of the Collegium Academicum.

During the 1960s and 1970s, the university grew dramatically in size. At this time, it developed into one of the main scenes of the left-wing student protests in Germany. In 1975, a massive police force arrested the entire student parliament AStA. Shortly thereafter, the building of the Collegium Academicum, a progressive college in immediate vicinity to the universities main grounds, was stormed by over 700 police officers and closed once and for all. The Collegium was dissolved in 1975 and the "old barracks" (German: Alte Kaserne) were refurbished and transformed into administration buildings. On the outskirts of the city, in the Neuenheimer Feld area, a large campus for medicine and natural sciences was constructed.

Today, about 28,000 students are enrolled for studies at Heidelberg University. There are 4,196 full-time faculty, including 476 university professors. In 2007, the university was appointed University of Excellence within the scope of an initiative started by the Federal Ministry of Education and Research and the German Research Foundation to enhance the German university system by establishing a small network of exceptionally well-funded universities, which are expected to generate a strong international appeal.

On 24 January 2022, a mass shooting occurred at the university. An 18-year-old male student carrying a double-barreled shotgun and a lever action rifle entered a lecture hall of Heidelberg and opened fire on the crowd. He injured four people, with one woman later dying of her injuries. The shooter then fled the scene and was later found dead by suicide. The gunman's motives are reported to be unclear.
