= List of Heidelberg University people =

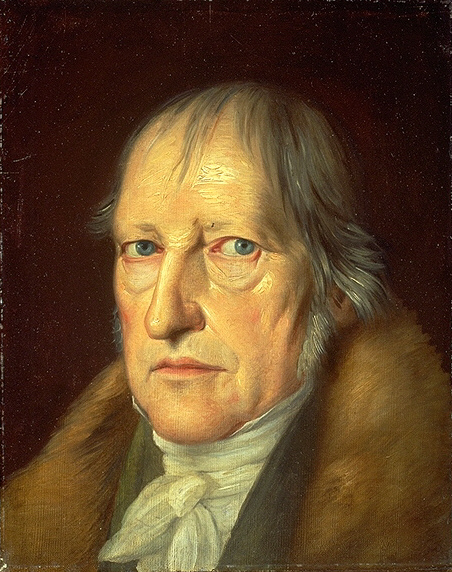
Georg Wilhelm Friedrich Hegel (1770–1831) was one of the most prominent German philosophers who taught in Heidelberg.

Alumni and faculty of the university include many founders and pioneers of academic disciplines, and a large number of internationally acclaimed philosophers, poets, jurisprudents, theologians, natural and social scientists. 56 Nobel Laureates, at least 18 Leibniz Laureates, and two "Oscar" winners have been associated with Heidelberg University. Nine Nobel Laureates received the award during their tenure at Heidelberg.

Besides several Federal Ministers of Germany and Prime Ministers of German States, five Chancellors of Germany have attended the university, the latest being Helmut Kohl, the "Chancellor of the Reunification". Heads of State or Government of Belgium, Bulgaria, Greece, Nicaragua, Serbia, Thailand, a British prince, a Secretary General of NATO and a director of the International Peace Bureau have also been educated at Heidelberg; among them Nobel Peace Laureates Charles Albert Gobat and Auguste Beernaert. Former university affiliates in the field of religion include Pope Pius II, Cardinals, Bishops, and with Philipp Melanchthon and Zacharias Ursinus two key leaders of Protestant Reformation. Outstanding university affiliates in the legal profession include a President of the International Court of Justice, two Presidents of the European Court of Human Rights, a President of the International Tribunal for the Law of the Sea, a Vice President of the International Criminal Court, an Advocate General at the European Court of Justice, at least 16 Justices of the Federal Constitutional Court of Germany, a President of the Federal Court of Justice, a President of the Federal Court of Finance, a President of the Federal Labor Court, two Attorney Generals of Germany, and a British Law Lord. In business, Heidelberg alumni and faculty notably founded, co-founded or presided over ABB Group; Astor corporate enterprises; BASF; BDA; Daimler AG; Deutsche Bank; EADS; Krupp AG; Siemens AG; and Thyssen AG.

Alumni in the field of arts include classical composer Robert Schumann, philosophers Ludwig Feuerbach and Edmund Montgomery, poet Joseph Freiherr von Eichendorff and writers Christian Friedrich Hebbel, Gottfried Keller, Irene Frisch, Heinrich Hoffmann, Sir Muhammad Iqbal, José Rizal, W. Somerset Maugham, Jean Paul, and Literature Nobel Laureate Carl Spitteler. Amongst Heidelberg alumni in other disciplines are the "Father of Psychology" Wilhelm Wundt, the "Father of Physical Chemistry" J. Willard Gibbs, the "Father of American Anthropology" Franz Boas, Dmitri Mendeleev, who created the periodic table of elements, inventor of the two-wheeler principle Karl Drais, Alfred Wegener, who discovered the continental drift, as well as political theorist Hannah Arendt, political scientist Carl Joachim Friedrich, and sociologists Karl Mannheim, Robert E. Park and Talcott Parsons.

Philosophers Georg Wilhelm Friedrich Hegel, Karl Jaspers, Hans-Georg Gadamer, and Jürgen Habermas served as university professors, as did also the pioneering scientists Hermann von Helmholtz, Robert Wilhelm Bunsen, Gustav Robert Kirchhoff, Emil Kraepelin, the founder of scientific psychiatry, and outstanding social scientists such as Max Weber, the founding father of modern sociology. Present faculty include Medicine Nobel Laureates Bert Sakmann (1991) and Harald zur Hausen (2008), Chemistry Nobel Laureate Stefan Hell (2014), 7 Leibniz Laureates, former Justice of the Federal Constitutional Court of Germany Paul Kirchhof, and Rüdiger Wolfrum, the former President of the International Tribunal for the Law of the Sea.

== Alumni ==
Name	Affiliation	Years at Heidelberg	Importance / Notes	Ref
Herbert Baxter Adams (1850–1901)	Historian	~around 1872–1876	Founder of the American Historical Association. Established one of the first history Ph.D. programs to follow the new German seminary method at Johns Hopkins University around 1880.	
Felix Adler (1851–1933)	Educator	1870–1874	Founder of the Ethical Culture Movement in 1876.	
Louis Agassiz (1807–1873)	Paleontologist	~around 1824–1829	First to publish the Ice Age Hypothesis in 1840.	
Christoph Ahlhaus (1990–)	Politician	1990–1993	Mayor and Prime Minister of Hamburg	
Edward Andrade (1887–1971)	Physicist	1911–1913	Worked with Ernest Rutherford to show the wave nature of gamma rays in 1914.	
Hannah Arendt (1906–1975)	Political theorist	1926–1928	Author of The Origins of Totalitarianism and The Human Condition; reported on the Eichmann trial in Jerusalem.	
Friedrich Arnold (1803–1890)	Anatomist	?–1825	Privy councillor; described the reflex of coughing when the ear is stimulated; the auricular branch of the vagus nerve was nicknamed "Arnold's nerve"	
William Backhouse Astor, Sr. (1850–1901)	Financier		Head of the Astor corporate enterprises; nicknamed "the Landlord of New York"	
Frederick II, Grand Duke of Baden (1857–1928)	Statesman	?	Head of State of the Grand Duchy of Baden; General Field Marshal of the German Imperial Army	
Prince Maximilian of Baden (1867–1929)	Statesman	?	Last Chancellor of the German Empire	
Adolf von Baeyer (1835–1917)	Chemist	~around 1852–1858	Synthesized indigo; discovered the phthalein dyes; proposed the correct formula for indole; introduced the strain theory in triple bonds and carbon rings. Chemistry Nobel laureate	
Matthias Basedau (1968- )	German political scientist	~around 1995-2001	director of the GIGA Institute for African Studies	
George Bancroft (1800–1891)	Statesman and historian	~around 1813–1822	U.S. Secretary of the Navy; established the United States Naval Academy at Annapolis in 1845; Author of "History of the United States, from the Discovery of the American Continent"	
Auguste Beernaert (1829–1912)	Statesman	~around 1850–1853	Prime Minister of Belgium and Nobel Peace Laureate	
Rudolf Bernhardt (1925–)	Jurisprudent	1956–1962	President of the European Court of Human Rights	
Daniel Bernoulli (1700–1782)	Mathematician	1718–1719	Developed the Bernoulli's principle and together with Leonhard Euler the Euler–Bernoulli beam equation.	
Manfred Bischoff (1942–)	Executive		Chairman of EADS; Chairman of DaimlerChrysler	
Franz Boas (1858–1942)	Anthropologist	April–September 1877	Started applying the scientific method to the study of human cultures and societies; "Father of American Anthropology"	
Edgar Bodenheimer (1908–1991)	Jurisprudent	?	Author of "Jurisprudence: The Philosophy and Method of the Law", "Treatise on Justice", "Philosophy of Responsibility"	
Max Born (1882–1970)	Physicist	?	Formulated the matrix mechanics representation of quantum mechanics in collaboration with Werner Heisenberg; Physics Nobel laureate	
Huberta von Bronsart (1892–1978)	Biologist	?		
Andreas von Bülow (1937–)	Statesman	?	Federal Minister of Education and Research	
Reinhard Bütikofer (1953–)	Statesman	?	Chairman of the Green Party of Germany	
George C. Butte (1877–1940)	Jurist	1913 (Jurisprudence)	Republican gubernatorial nominee in Texas, 1924; member of the Supreme Court of the Philippine Islands, 1932–1936	
Moritz Cantor (1829–1920)	Mathematician	1848–?	Founded the history of mathematics as a scientific discipline	
Conrad Celtes (1459–1508)	Humanist scholar	1484–1485	First to teach human history as a whole; discovered the Tabula Peutingeriana	
Rangsit, Prince of Chainat (1885–1951)	Statesman	?	Prince regent of Thailand	
John W. Chanler (1826–1877)	Lawyer	?	Top lawyer; U.S. Representative from New York; member of the Astor family	
Prince Albert Victor, Duke of Clarence and Avondale (1864–1892)	Royalty	1884		
John Amos Comenius (1592–1670)	Theologian	?	Bishop of Lissa; author of Didactica Magna; became the symbol of the Czech nation	
Wilhelm Cuno (1876–1933)	Statesman	?	Chancellor of the German Weimar Republic	
Nicholas of Cusa (1401–1464)	Theologian and polymath	?	Roman Catholic Cardinal	
Karl Drais (1785–1851)	Inventor	1803–1805	Inventor of the two-wheeler principle that started mechanized transport	
Johann Eck (1486–1543)	Theologian	1498–1501	Martin Luther's Catholic opponent during Protestant Reformation; Papal legate and Inquisitor	
Norbert Elias (1897–1990)	Sociologist	~around 1917–1920	Founder of figurational sociology; author of The Civilizing Process	
Joseph Freiherr von Eichendorff (1788–1857)	Poet	1807–1808	Author of Memoirs of a Good-for-Nothing, "Die Zauberei im Herbst", Ahnung und Gegenwart, "Auch ich war in Arkadien"	
Richard T. Ely (1854–1943)	Economist	?	Co-founder and president of the American Economic Association; editor of Macmillan's Citizen's Library of Economics, Politics, and Sociology; Professor at Johns Hopkins University and University of Wisconsin–Madison	
Ludwig Feuerbach (1804–1872)	Philosopher	?	Author of The Essence of Christianity	
Carl-August Fleischhauer (1930–2005)	Jurist	-1954	Judge in the International Court of Justice	
James Franck (1882–1964)	Physicist	?	Invented the Franck–Hertz experiment; confirmed the Bohr model of the atom; Physics Nobel laureate	
Sebastian Franck (1499–1542)	Theologian	?	Author of "Weltbuch", "Chronicle of Germany", "Universal Chronicle of the World's History from the Earliest Times to the Present", "The Tree of the Knowledge of Good and Evil", "The Vanity of Arts and Sciences"	
Wilhelm Frick (1877–1946)	Nazi government	?–1901	Minister of the Interior of the Third Reich, executed for war crimes	
Carl Joachim Friedrich (1901–1984)	Political scientist	?–1925	Developed the concept of a "good democracy"; laid out a theoretical framework for the European Union; co-author of "Totalitarian Dictatorship and Autocracy" with Zbigniew Brzezinski, author of "Man and His Government: An Empirical Theory of Politics"; Professor at Harvard University	
Erich Fromm (1900–1980)	Psychologist	?–1922	Co-founder of political psychology; author of The Art of Loving, Escape from Freedom; co-founder of The Committee for a SANE Nuclear Policy	
Lazarus Immanuel Fuchs (1833–1902)	Mathematician	?	Developed the Fuchsian groups and functions, the Picard–Fuchs equation and the Fuchsian differential equations	
Rüdiger Hell (1959–)	Biologist	2003-		
Otto von Gerlach (1801–1849)	Theologian	?	Published a major rewrite of the Old and New Testament after Martin Luther; Dome Minister and Konsistorialrat	
Georg Gottfried Gervinus (1805–1871)	Political historian	1826–1828	Advocate of democracy before and during the 1848 revolution; member of the Göttingen Seven; member of the 1848 Frankfurt Parliament;	
Constantin Virgil Gheorghiu (1916–1992)	Writer	?	Author of "The 25th Hour", "Les inconnus de Heidelberg", "Dieu a Paris", "Le peuple des immortels", "Calligraphies sur la Neige"	
J. Willard Gibbs (1839–1903)	Physicist, chemist and mathematician	1868	Pioneer of chemical thermodynamics and physical chemistry; inventor of vector analysis; member of the Hall of Fame for Great Americans	
Albert Gobat (1843–1914)	Statesman	?–1867	Director of the International Peace Bureau; Member of the Swiss National Council; Nobel Peace laureate	
Joseph Goebbels (1897–1945)	Nazi government	?–1921	Minister of Public Enlightenment of the Third Reich; succeeded Adolf Hitler as Chancellor of Nazi Germany	
Franciscus Gomarus (1563–1641)	Theologian	?–1591	Founder of the Gomarist movement; leader of the 1618 Synod of Dordrecht	
Constantine I of Greece (1868–1920)	Statesman	?	King of Greece	
August Grisebach (1814–1879)	Botanist	?	Founded biogeography as a scientific discipline; author of "The Earth's vegetation after its climatic arrangement" and "Catalogus plantarum cubensium"	
Friedrich Gundolf (1880–1931)	Writer	?	Co-founder of the Georgekreis; author of "Die deutsche Literärgeschicht, Reimweis kurz fasslich hergericht´", "Andreas Gryphius", "Shakespeare", "Paracelsus", "Romantiker"; also Professor at Heidelberg from 1916 onwards.	
Fritz Haber (1868–1934)	Chemist	1886–1891	Developed synthetic ammonia; developed and deployed chlorine and other poison gases; "father of chemical warfare"; Chemistry Nobel laureate	
Gunther von Hagens (1945–)	Artist and physician	?–1975	Inventor the technique for preserving biological tissue specimens called plastination; initiator of the Body Worlds exhibition of human bodies and body parts.	
Theodor W. Hänsch (1941–)	Physicist	?	Developed an optical "frequency comb synthesiser", which makes it possible, for the first time, to measure with extreme precision the number of light oscillations per second; Physics Nobel laureate	
James Hannen, Baron Hannen (1821–1849)	Justice	?	Lord of Appeal in Ordinary; Life peer	
Monika Harms (1946–)	Jurisprudent	1966–1967	Attorney General of Germany	
Franz-Ulrich Hartl (1957–)	Biochemist	?	Managing Director of the Max Planck Institute of Biochemistry; Wiley Prize laureate in Biomedical Science "for his significant contribution in protein folding"; Lewis S. Rosenstiel Award laureate "for distinguished work in basic medical science"	
Christian Friedrich Hebbel (1813–1863)	Writer	?	Author of "Maria Magdalene", "Judith", "Genoveva", "Herodes and Mariamne", and of the trilogy "Die Nibelungen "	
Rudolf Heinze (1865–1928)	Statesman	?	Vice-Chancellor of Germany; German Ministry of Justice (Weimar Republic)	
Barnabas Kelet Henagan (1798–1855)	Statesman	?	Governor of South Carolina	
Heinrich Hoffmann (1885–1957)	Writer	1829–1832	Author of children's books including "Der Struwwelpeter"	
Chlodwig, Prince of Hohenlohe-Schillingsfürst (1819–1901)	Statesman		Chancellor of the German Empire	
Charles Henry Huberich (1877–1945)	Jurisprudent	(?–?)	Dean of Stanford Law School	
Heinrich Hübsch (1795–1863)	Architect	1813–1815	Designer of the University of Karlsruhe main building, State Art Gallery Karlsruhe, Baden State Theater, west front of the Speyer Cathedral	
Sir Muhammad Iqbal (1877–1938)	Poet, philosopher and politician	?	Leader of the All India Muslim League; author of "Asrar-i-Khudi", "Rumuz-i-Bekhudi", "Payam-i-Mashriq", "Bang-i-Dara", "Zabur-i-Ajam", "Javid Nama", "Bal-i-Jibril", "Zarb-i-Kalim", "What should then be done O people of the East", "Armaghan-i-Hijaz"	
Philipp von Jolly (1809–1884)	Physicist	?	Contributed significantly to the understanding of gravitational acceleration and osmosis; teacher of Max Planck; also Professor at Heidelberg from 1839 onwards	
Heike Kamerlingh Onnes (1853–1926)	Physicist	1871–1873	Explored extremely cold refrigeration techniques and the associated phenomena; Physics Nobel laureate	
Ernst Kantorowicz (1895–1963)	Historian	?	Author of "The King's Two Bodies" and of "Kaiser Friedrich der Zweite"; Professor at Oxford University, University of California, Berkeley and Princeton University	
Hans-Peter Kaul (*1943)	Jurisprudent	1967–1971	Vice President of the International Criminal Court	
James E. Keeler (1857–1900)	Astronomer	?	Discovered the Encke Division, the Keeler Gap and two asteroids; co-founder of the Astrophysical Journal; Henry Draper Medalist	
Gottfried Keller (1819–1890)	Writer	1848–1850	Author of "Green Henry", "A Village Romeo and Juliet", "Seldwyla Folks", "Zurich Novellas", "Martin Salander"	
Jerome Kern (1885–1945)	Composer	1904	Composed The Way You Look Tonight, Ol' Man River, A Fine Romance, Smoke Gets in Your Eyes; Academy Award for the soundtrack of the movie Swing Time	
Wolfgang Ketterle (1957–)	Physicist	1976–1979	Contributed significantly to fundamental studies of condensates; completed experiments that trap and cool atoms to temperatures close to absolute zero, and he led one of the first groups to realize Bose–Einstein condensation in these systems; Physics Nobel laureate; also assistant professor at Heidelberg from 1986 to 1990	
Gustav Koerner (1809–1896)	Jurist	graduated as Doctor juris utriusque in 1832	Politician, lawyer, judge and statesman in Illinois; United States Minister to Spain, 1862–1864	
Helmut Kohl (1930–2017)	Statesman	1951–1956	Chancellor of the Federal Republic of Germany; "Architect of the German Reunification"	
Juliane Kokott (1957–)	Jurisprudent	1982–1985	Advocate General at the European Court of Justice	
Hermann Franz Moritz Kopp (1817–1892)	Chemist	?–1839	Discovered several important correlations of the physical properties of substances with their chemical constitution; significant research on specific volumes and on the connection of the boiling point of compounds with their composition; also Professor at Heidelberg from 1864 onwards	
Sofia Kovalevskaya (1850–1891)	Mathematician	?	Developed the Cauchy–Kowalevski theorem; first woman who was appointed to a full professorship in Europe	
Gustav Krupp (1870–1950)	Industrialist	1888–1893	Owner and Chairman of the Krupp AG heavy industry conglomerate; Prussian Ambassador to the Holy See	
Hans Heinrich Lammers (1879–1962)	Nazi government	?	Head of the Reich Chancellery; Reich Minister without Portfolio	
Ingeborg Levin	Geoscientist	Doctorate	Institute of Environmental Physics, Lab Director	
Judah Leon Magnes (1877–1948)	Rabbi, Pacifist and university chancellor	Doctorate 1902	First Chancellor of Hebrew University of Jerusalem	
Vera Lüth	Physicist	1966–1974	Experimental particle physicist and professor emerita at Stanford Linear Accelerator Center, senator of the Helmholtz Association	
Golo Mann (1909–1994)	Writer and historian	1929–1932	Author of "Friedrich von Gentz", "Vom Geist Amerikas", "Von Weimar nach Bonn. Fünfzig Jahre deutsche Republik", "Erinnerungen und Gedanken. Eine Jugend in Deutschland", "Wir alle sind, was wir gelesen", "Wissen und Trauer. Historische Portraits und Skizzen"; Son of Thomas Mann and Katia Mann	
W. Somerset Maugham (1874–1965)	Novelist	1890–?	Author of Of Human Bondage, The Moon and Sixpence, Cakes and Ale, The Razor's Edge, The Magician	
Georg Ludwig von Maurer (1790–1872)	Statesman	?–1812	Member of the Council of Regency of Greece; Bavarian Minister of Foreign Affairs and Minister of Justice;	
Charles McLaren, 1st Baron Aberconway (1850–1934)	Statesman	?	Member of the House of Commons of the United Kingdom; member of the House of Lords; Order of the Redeemer (Greece); Order of the Sacred Treasures (Japan)	
Philip Melanchthon (1497–1560)	Theologian	1509–1512	Key leader of the Protestant Reformation; friend and associate of Martin Luther	
Christian Erich Hermann von Meyer (1801–1869)	Paleontologist	?	Introduced vertebrate paleontology in Germany; proposed the classification of fossil reptiles into four major groups based on their limbs	
Otto Meyerhof (1884–1951)	Physician	?–1909	Cardinal work on muscle metabolism, including glycolysis; also Director of the Heidelberg Kaiser Wilhelm Institute for Medical Research; Physiology or Medicine Nobel laureate	
Johann von Miquel (1829–1901)	Statesman	?	Prussian Minister of Finance; Lord Mayor of Frankfurt am Main	
Alfred Mombert (1872–1942)	Poet	?	Author of "Der Sonnengeist", "Aeon, der Weltgesuchte", "Aeon vor Syrakus", "Der Himmlische Zecher", "Der Held der Erde, Aeon Zwischen den Frauen"	
Rudolf Mössbauer (1929–)	Physicist	1955–1957	Discovered the Mössbauer effect; Professor at the California Institute of Technology; Physics Nobel laureate	
F. W. Murnau (1888–1931)	Film director	?	Director of Nosferatu, The Last Laugh, Faust, Sunrise: A Song of Two Humans; Academy Award for Sunrise: A Song of Two Humans	
Karl Friedrich Neumann (1793–1870)	Orientalist	?	Author of "A History of the United States of America"; "Geschichte des englischen Reichs in Asien", "Versuch einer Geschichte der armenischen Literatur", "Die Volker des südlichen Russland", "Geschichte des englisch-chinesischen Kriegs "	
George Newlands (????–)	Theologian	?	Convenor of the General Assembly of the Church of Scotland's Panel on Doctrine; member of the Doctrine Commission of the Church of England; Chair of the Theology, Divinity & Religious Studies panel of the UK's Research Assessment Exercise; Professor of Divinity, Glasgow	
Max Nonne (1861–1959)	Neurologist	1879–1881	Discovered the Nonne-Apelt reaction and the Nonne-Milroy-Meige disease	
Alfred von Oberndorff (1870–1963)	Diplomat	c. 1888–1893, Dr.Iur.	Ambassador; signatory of the Armistice of 11 November 1918	
Robert E. Park (1864–1944)	Sociologist	1903	One of the main founders of the Chicago School of sociology; president of the American Sociological Association and of the Chicago Urban League; Professor at Harvard University and at the University of Chicago	
Talcott Parsons (1902–1979)	Sociologist	1925–1927	Produced a general theoretical system for the analysis of society that came to be called structural functionalism; created the Harvard Department of Social Relations	
Jean Paul (1763–1825)	Novelist	1817	Author of "Greenland Lawsuits", "Selections from the Devil's Papers", "The Invisible Lodge", "Life of the Cheerful Schoolmaster Maria Wutz", "Biographical Recreations under the Brainpan of a Giantess"	
George H. Pendleton (1825–1889)	Statesman	c. 1845	United States Senator from Ohio; nominee for Vice President of the United States; United States Ambassador to Germany;	
Hugo Preuß (1860–1925)	Statesman	~around 1879–1883	Minister of the Interior; "Father of the German constitution of the Weimar Republic"	
Sir William Ramsay (1852–1916)	Chemist	?	Discovered argon; significant contributions to the discovery of the inert gaseous elements in air; Chemistry Nobel laureate	
Egon Ranshofen-Wertheimer (1894–1957)	Diplomat	?–1921	Executive, supervisor, and diplomat for the League of Nations and United Nations Organization; author of "Portrait of the British Labour Party"	
Thomas Caute Reynolds (1821–1887)	Politician	1842	Lieutenant Governor of Missouri; Governor of Missouri (Confederate)	
Jovan Ristić (1894–1957)	Statesman	?–?	Acted as regent of Serbia twice and served as Serbian prime minister four times (1867, 1875, 1877–81, 1887–88).	
José Rizal (1861–1896)	Writer	1887	Author of Noli Me Tangere and El Filibusterismo; founder of La Liga Filipina; "national hero of the Philippines"	
Richard Rothe (1799–1867)	Theologian	?	Co-founder of the Protestantenverein; author of "Die Anfänge der christlichen Kirche und ihrer Verfassung", "Theologische Ethik", "Zur Dogmatik"	
Mayer Amschel de Rothschild (1818–1874)	Financier	?	Banker; High Sheriff of Buckinghamshire; MP for Hythe	
Henrique de Carvalho Santos (????)	Statesman	?	Minister of Industry of Angola	
Hermann Scheer (1944–2001)	Politician	1967–1972	Member of the German Bundestag; President of Eurosolar; major exponent of renewable energy; Right Livelihood Award 1999	
Matthias Jakob Schleiden (1804–1881)	Biologist	?	Co-founder of the cell theory	
Hanns Martin Schleyer (1915–1977)	Executive	1933–1938	Entrepreneur and head of Confederation of German Employers' Associations; killed by Red Army Faction during the German Autumn	
Bernhard Schlink (* 1944)	Novelist and jurisprudent		Author of The Reader	
Robert Schumann (1810–1856)	Composer	1829–1830	Composed "piano quintet", "Paradise and the Peri", "Faust", "Genoveva", "Rhenish Symphony"	
Jacob Gould Schurman (1854–1942)	Diplomat	~around 1877–1880	President of Cornell University; U.S. Ambassador to Greece, China and Germany; Benefactor of the University of Heidelberg	
William Berryman Scott (1858–1947)	Paleontologist	?–1880	Authority on mammals; author of the White River Oligocene monographs; Professor at Princeton University; Penrose Medalist	
Anna Seghers (1900–1983)	Poet	?	Author of The Seventh Cross, The Dead Stay Young, Benito's Blue and Nine Other Stories, A Price on His Head, Revolt of the Fishermen of Santa Barbara	
Anja Seibert-Fohr	Judge and Professor	2016–	Judge at the European Court of Human Rights, and Professor at the University of Heidelberg	
Georg Wilhelm von Siemens (1855–1919)	Industrialist	~around 1876–1879	Owner and Chairman of Siemens AG; privy councillor	
Georg von Siemens (1839–1901)	Banker	?	Co-founder and director of Deutsche Bank; financed the Northern Pacific Railway and Baghdad Railway; member of the imperial Reichstag	
Hans Spemann (1869–1941)	Physician	?	Discovered the effect now known as Embryonic induction; Physiology or Medicine Nobel laureate	
Guy Spier (1966–)	Investor, Author	Summer, 1988	Author of "The Education of a Value Investor", manager of the Aquamarine Fund	
Carl Spitteler (1845–1924)	Poet	?	Author of The Olympic Spring; Literature Nobel laureate	
Jakob Steiner (1796–1863)	Mathematician	1818–1821	Renowned Swiss mathematician	
Konstantin Stoilov (1853–1901)	Statesman	?–1877	Prime Minister of Bulgaria	
Hans-Christian Ströbele (1939–)	Statesman	1960–?	Deputy Parliamentary Leader of the Green Party of Germany	
Thomas Sydserf (1581–1663)	Theologian	?	Bishop of Brechin; Bishop of Galloway; Bishop of Orkney	
Haldun Taner (1915–1986)	Playwright	1935–1938	Author of Kesanli Ali; Founder of Devekuşu Kabere	
Heinrich, Baron Thyssen-Bornemisza de Kászon (1875–1947)	Industrialist	?–1900	Founder and Chairman of the Thyssen AG heavy industry conglomerate	
Arnold J. Toynbee (1889–1975)	Historian	?–?	Director of the Royal Institute of International Affairs; professor at the London School of Economics	
Gianni Vattimo (1936–)	Philosopher	?	Author of The End of Modernity: Nihilism and Hermeneutics in Post-modern Culture, The Transparent Society, After Christianity, The Future of Religion, After the Death of God; member of the European Parliament	
Bernhard Vogel (1932–)	Statesman	1953–1960	Prime Minister of Rhineland-Palatinate and Thuringia	
William Walker (1824–1860)	Statesman and filibuster	?	President of Nicaragua	
Carl Warburg (1805–1892)	Physician and Clinical Pharmacologist	? Late 1820s ?	Inventor of Warburg's Tincture, a famed antipyretic and antimalarial medicine of the 19th-century	
Otto Warburg (1883–1970)	Physician	1906–1911	Discovered flavine; important work on nicotinic acid amide; Order Pour le Mérite; Physiology or Medicine Nobel laureate	
Alfred Wegener (1880–1930)	Earth Scientist	?	Discovered the continental drift and the thermodynamics of the atmosphere; developed the theory of the super-continent Pangea; eponym of the Wegener Impact Craters on both Mars and Moon	
Luzius Wildhaber (1937–)	Jurisprudent	?	President of the European Court of Human Rights; Vice President of the OSCE Court of Conciliation and Arbitration; Judge at the Constitutional Court of Liechtenstein	
Bohdan Winiarski (1884–1969)	Jurisprudent	?	President of the International Court of Justice	
Friedrich Wöhler (1800–1882)	Chemist	?–1823	Synthesized urea and calcium carbide; co-discoverer of beryllium and silicon; first to isolate yttrium, beryllium, and titanium	
Manfred Wörner (1934–1994)	Statesman		Secretary General of NATO; Federal Minister of Defense	
Joseph Wright (1855–1930)	Linguist	?–1885	Author of the six-volume English Dialect Dictionary, Dialect Test, Rustic Speech and Folklore; Professor at Oxford University	
Wilhelm Wundt (1832–1920)	Psychologist	~around 1851–1856	Author of Principles of Physiological Psychology; eponym of "Wilhelm Wundt-William James Award for Exceptional Contributions to Trans-Atlantic Psychology" awarded by the American Psychological Association; "Father of Psychology"	
Karl Zell (1793–1873)	Statesman	~around 1810–1814	Member of the Upper Chamber of the Diet of Baden; reformer of the high-school system of Baden; established a special board for the supervision and encouragement of the higher studies; president of the congresses for Catholic Germany	

- Judah Leon Magnes, Chancellor/President of the Hebrew University of Jerusalem, 1925–1948

== Faculty ==
Name	Affiliation	Years at Heidelberg	Importance / Notes	Ref
Rodolphus Agricola (1443–1485)	Humanist Scholar	1482–1485	Author of De inventione dialectica – a significant work for Renaissance Humanism and the education of Northern European humanists in the 15th century.	
Géza Alföldy (1935– )	Historian	1975–2005	Gottfried Wilhelm Leibniz Prize (1986); Bundesverdienstkreuz 1. Klasse (2002)	
Gerhard Anschütz (1867–1948)	Jurisprudent	1900–1933	Leading commentator of the Weimar Constitution; consultant to the US military government in Germany after World War II; one of the "fathers" of the constitution of Hesse.	
Friedrich Arnold (1803–1890)	Anatomist	1852–1873	Privy councillor; described the reflex of coughing when the ear is stimulated (Arnold's nerve cough); the auricular branch of the vagus nerve was nicknamed Arnold's nerve; the Arnold's canal and Arnold's ganglion are named after him.	
Jan Assmann (1938– )	Egyptologist	1976–2003	Developed the theory of cultural memory; published renowned works on the origin and development of monotheism; Ph.D. h.c. from Yale University et al.; Bundesverdienstkreuz 1. Klasse (2006)	
François Baudouin (1520–1573)	Jurisprudent	1555–1561	Established the palingenetic method of presentation of legal source; reconstructed the original legislation of Justinian; important commentator on Roman law	
Klaus Berger (1940– )	Theologian	1974–2006	Leading interdisciplinary theologian in Germany in the 1970s and 1980s; particularly known for his works on exegetical methodology, history of religion, form criticism, and hermeneutics.	
Friedrich Bergius (1884–1949)	Chemist	?–?	Chemistry Nobel laureate "in recognition of the contributions to the invention and development of chemical high pressure methods"; Ph.D. honoris causa from Harvard University	
Klaus von Beyme (1934–)	Political Scientist	1974–1999	First West German university student in Moscow after World War II; president of the International Political Science Association (1982–1985); ranked 10th most important political scientist of the world (1991).	
Theodor Ludwig Wilhelm Bischoff (1807–1882)	Anatomist	?–1843	One of the first to conclude, based on comparative anatomy of the skull and brain, that women had a general intellectual deficiency for academia.	
Johann Kaspar Bluntschli (1808–1881)	Jurisprudent	1861–1881	Co-founder of the Institut de Droit International; author of Privatrechtliches Gesetzbuch für den Kanton Zurich, Geschichte des algemeinen Staatsrechts und der Politik, Das moderne Kriegsrecht, Das moderne Völkerrecht, Das Beuterecht im Krieg; Bluntschli's library was acquired by Johns Hopkins University.	
August Böckh (1785–1867)	Classical Scholar	1807–1811	Author of De Metris Pindari, Die Staatshaushaltung der Athener; pioneer in investigating ancient chronology; Order Pour le Mérite in 1857	
Carl Bosch (1874–1940)	Chemist	–1940	Co-founder of IG Farben; Chairman of BASF; Chemistry Nobel laureate "in recognition of the contributions to the invention and development of chemical high pressure methods"; eponym of Haber–Bosch process	
Walther Bothe (1891–1957)	Physicist	1932–1957	Pour le Mérite (1952); Max Planck Medal (1953); Physics Nobel laureate (1954) "for the coincidence method and his discoveries made therewith".	
Markus Büchler (1955– )	Physician	2001–	Founder and medical director of the European Pancreas Center; director of the Heidelberg Clinic for General, Visceral and Transplantation Surgery; managing medical director of the Heidelberg Clinic for Surgery.	
Robert Wilhelm Bunsen (1811–1899)	Chemist	1852–1899	Developed the Bunsen burner; worked on the emission spectroscopy of heated elements; discovered together with Gustav Kirchhoff the elements caesium and rubidium.	
Conrad Celtes (1459–1508)	Humanist Scholar	1495–1496	Founded the Sodalitas Litteraria Vistulana, Rhenana, Hungarorum, and Danubiana; first to teach the human history as a whole; discovered the Tabula Peutingeriana	
Georg Friedrich Creuzer (1771–1851)	Philologist	1804–1845	Privy councillor; co-founder of the Philological Seminary at the University of Heidelberg (1807); friend of Johann Wolfgang von Goethe and Clemens Brentano; liaison with Karoline von Günderrode.	
Otto Crusius (1857–1918)	Classical Scholar	1898–1903	President of the Bavarian Academy of Sciences and Humanities (1915–1918).	
Johann von Dalberg (1445–1503)	Bishop	1480–1503	Bishop of Worms (1482–1503); Chancellor of the University of Heidelberg (1480–1503); supported the development of humanism at the University of Heidelberg; friend of Rodolphus Agricola; honored with a bust in the Walhalla temple (1842).	
Hugo Donellus (1527–1591)	Jurisprudent	1573–1579	Leading representatives of legal humanism; pioneer in applying the methods of Renaissance humanism to law	
Thomas Erastus (1524–1583)	Humanist, physician, & theologian	1558–1580	Opponent of Calvinist disciplinary regime and thus father of "Erastianism", denying the church independent jurisdiction over moral infractions in a Christian state. Challenged ideas of Paracelsus and Johann Weyer.	
Friedrich von Duhn (1859–1930)	Archaeologist	1879–1920	Recognized scattered fragments of sculpture as the remains of the Ara Pacis; largely expanded the archaeological collection of the University of Heidelberg.	
Norbert Frey (1966-)	Physician	2020–	Medical Director of the Department of Cardiology, Angiology and Pneumology	
Jakob Friedrich Fries (1773–1843)	Philosopher	1806–1816	Author of Wissen, Glaube und Ahnung, Neue oder anthropologische Kritik der Vernunft, Reinhold, Fichte und Schelling, System der Philosophie als evidente Wissenschaft	
Hans-Georg Gadamer (1900–2002)	Philosopher	1949–2002	Elaborated the concept of "philosophical hermeneutics"; author of Truth and Method; taught at Heidelberg until his death at the age of 102.	
Georg Gottfried Gervinus (1805–1871)	Historian	1830–1871	Founder of Deutsche Zeitung; member of the 1848 Frankfurt Parliament; "Guide of the Nation" in political history	?
Otto von Gierke (1841–1921)	Jurisprudent	1884–1887	Developed important contributions to the Rechtsstaat conception; author of Das deutsche Genossenschaftsrecht, Deutsches Privatrecht, Naturrrecht und Deutsches Recht	
Jan Gruter (1560–1627)	Humanist scholar	1597–1627	Author of Inscriptiones antiquae totius orbis Romani and Lampas, sive fax artium liberalium ; last librarian of the Bibliotheca Palatina	?
Levin Goldschmidt (1828–1897)	Jurisprudent	1855–1870	Major contributor to the development of the German commercial law (Handelsgestzbuch); founder and editor of the Zeitschrift für das Gesamte Handelsrecht; Member of the German Imperial Reichstag; Federal Judge at the Bundesgericht	?
Dionysius Gothofredus (1549–1622)	Jurisprudent	1600–1621	Author of Corpus juris civilis; member of the council of two hundred of Geneva; Dean of the Heidelberg Faculty of Law	?
Emil Julius Gumbel (1891–1966)	Mathematician	1924–1932	Developed the Extreme value theory; founder and editor of Die Weltbühne; anti-Nazi-activist; professor at Columbia University	?
Jürgen Habermas (1929– )	Philosopher	1961–1964	Author of The Structural Transformation of the Public Sphere; The Theory of Communicative Action; Between Facts and Norms: Contributions to a Discourse Theory of Law and Democracy; The Inclusion of the Other; A Berlin Republic; Old Europe, New Europe, Core Europe	?
Werner Hacke (1948– )	Neurologist	1987–	Chairman of the Department of Neurology; Feinberg Award recipient; Karolinska Stroke Award recipient	?
Karl Hampe (1869–1936)	Historian	?	Author of "Germany under the Salic and Hohenstaufen Emperors"; Dean of the Faculty of Philosophy; Rector of Heidelberg University	?
Sebastian Harnisch (b.1967)	International Relations	?	Internationale Politik und Verfassung. Zur Domestizierung des sicherheits- und europapolitischen Prozesses der Bundesrepublik Deutschland, Baden-Baden: Nomos- Verlag, 2006.	?
Harald zur Hausen (1936)	Physician	1983–present	2008 Physiology or Medicine Nobel Laureate "for his discovery of human papilloma viruses causing cervical cancer"; former director of the Heidelberg German Cancer Research Center; member of the faculty of the medical school	
Georg Wilhelm Friedrich Hegel (1770–1831)	Philosopher	1816–1818	"Father of German idealism"; author of Elements of the Philosophy of Right; Phenomenology of Spirit; Encyclopedia of the Philosophical Sciences; Science of Logic	?
Stefan Hell (*1962)	Physicist	1981–1990 (student); since 2003 Professor of Physics	Chemistry Nobel Laureate 2014; inventor of Stimulated Emission Depletion microscopy and related microscopy methods	
Hermann von Helmholtz (1821–1894)	Physicist and physician	1858–1870	Medicine: developed the mathematics of the eye and theories of vision; cardinal work on the visual perception of space, color vision research, the sensation of tone and perception of sound; physics: introduced theories on the conservation of energy, developed a mechanical foundation of thermodynamics, significant work in electrodynamics and chemical thermodynamics; eponym of Helmholtz resonance	?
Otto Hesse (1811–1874)	Mathematician	1856–1868	Cardinal work on algebraic invariants; eponym of the Hessian matrix and the Hesse normal form	
Alfred Hettner (1859–1941)	Geographer	1906–1928	Developed a concept of chorology	?
Wilhelm Hofmeister (1824–1877)	Botanist	1863–1872	Discovered the principle of alternation of generations; pioneer in investigating genetics in plants; published a concept of plant evolution eight years before Darwin	?
Frank Hoffmeister (1969– )	Lawyer	– 1998	Academic (international law and organisations) and working for European Commission and United Nations	
Marsilius of Inghen (1330?–1396)	Philosopher	1386–1396	Co-founder and first Rector of the University of Heidelberg	?
Karl Jaspers (1883–1969)	Psychiatrist and Philosopher	1913–1948	Major exponent of existensialism; author of Philosophy of Existence; Reason and Existenz; Way to Wisdom; Philosophy is for Everman	?
Georg Jellinek (1851–1911)	Jurisprudent	1891–1911	Author of Allgemeine Staatslehre (General Theory of the State), a groundbreaking work on constitutional law and state philosophy before and during the Weimar Republic; member of the democratic circle around Max Weber	?
J. Hans D. Jensen (1907–1973)	Physicist	1949–1969	1963 Physics Nobel laureate "for the discoveries concerning nuclear shell structure"	?
Oskar Perron (1880–1975)	Mathematician	1914–1922	Major contributions concerning differential equations and partial differential equations; eponym of Perron–Frobenius theorem and Perron's formula	?
Jerome of Prague (1379–1416)	Philosopher	1406–1407	Introduced Realism in Germany	?
Paul Kirchhof (1943– )	Jurisprudent	1999–	Justice of the Federal Constitutional Court of Germany; member of the 2005 CDU shadow cabinet as designated Federal Minister of Finance; proposed a conception to reform the German tax system based on a flat tax	?
Gustav Robert Kirchhoff (1824–1887)	Physicist	1854–1875	Contributed to the fundamental understanding of electrical circuits, spectroscopy, and the emission of black-body radiation; coined the term "black-body"; eponym of "Kirchhoff's laws"; Rumford Medalist	?
Karl Knies (1821–1898)	Economist	1865–1895	Major representative of the historical school of economics; author of Political Economy from the Standpoint of the Historical Method	?
Leo Königsberger (1837–1921)	Mathematician and historian of science	1884–1914	Author of the biography of Hermann von Helmholtz and of Mein Leben	?
Albrecht Kossel (1853–1927)	Physician	1901–1927	1910 Physiology or Medicine Nobel laureate "in recognition of the contributions to our knowledge of cell chemistry made through his work on proteins, including the nucleic substances"	?
Emil Kraepelin (1856–1926)	Psychiatrist	1891–1903	Founder of modern scientific psychiatry, psychopharmacology and psychiatric genetics	?
Ludolf von Krehl (1861–1937)	Physiologist	1907–1931	Co-developed the Strophanthin-Therapy for treatment of cardiac deficiencies; cardinal work concerning the physiological and pathological aspects of thermoregulation, metabolism and the circulatory system; Co-founder of the Heidelberg Kaiser Wilhelm Institute for Medical Research; knighted in 1903, Order Pour le Mérite in 1925	?
Richard Kuhn (1900–1967)	Chemist	1928–1966	Director of the Heidelberg Kaiser Wilhelm Institute for Medical Research; discovery of the deadly nerve agent Soman; 1938 Chemistry Nobel laureate "for his work on carotenoids and vitamins"	
Emanuel Lasker (1868–1941)	Mathematician	1905–1933	Introduced the concept of a primary ideal, which extends the notion of a power of a prime number to algebraic geometry; World Champion of Chess from 1894 to 1921, 27 years in a row.	?
Lothar Ledderose (1942– )	Art historian	1976–	Acclaimed work on the history of art of Japan and history of art of China; dean of the Faculty of Philosophy; 2005 Balzan Laureate; Slade Professor at the University of Cambridge in 1992	?
Philipp Lenard (1862–1947)	Physicist	1904–1945	1905 Physics Nobel laureate "for his work on cathode rays"; during the 3rd Reich one of the leading advocates of Deutsche Physik (Aryan Physics).	?
Fritz Lipmann (1899–1986)	Biochemist	1929–1931	Co-discoverer of coenzyme A; professor at Harvard Medical School and Rockefeller University; Physiology or Medicine Nobel laureate	
Karl Löwith (1897–1973)	Philosopher	1952–1964	Author of From Hegel to Nietzsche and Meaning in History: The Theological Implications of the Philosophy of History	?
Peter Luder (1415–1472)	Humanist	1458–1461	Introduced Humanistic ideals in Germany	?
André Michel Lwoff (1902–1994)	Biologist	1932–1937	Coined the term Provirus; 1965 Physiology or Medicine Nobel laureate "for the discoveries concerning genetic control of enzyme and virus synthesis"	?
Michael Maestlin (1550–1631)	Astronomer and Mathematician	1580–1583	First to accept and teach the heliocentric Copernican view; discovered the "golden ratio"; mentor of Johannes Kepler	
Karl Mannheim (1893–1947)	Sociologist	1922–1930	Promoted a comprehensive sociological analysis of the structures of knowledge; author of Ideology Utopia; Man and Society in an Age of Reconstruction; Sociology as Political Education; professor at the London School of Economics	?
Dmitri Mendeleev (1834–1907)	Chemist	1859–1861	Creator of the first version of the periodic table of elements; eponym of the Mendeleev Medal	
Matthäus Merian (1593–1650)	Humanist Scholar	~ around 1620	Pioneering naturalist and illustrator	?
Christoph Michalski (1977)	Physician	2023–	Professor of Surgery and Chair of General Surgery, director of the Heidelberg Clinic for General, Visceral and Transplantation Surgery; managing medical director of the Heidelberg Clinic for Surgery	?
Subrata K. Mitra (1949)	Political Scientist	2004–	Cardinal research on Indian society and politics; director of the Heidelberg South Asia Institute; Chevalier dans l'Ordre des Palmes Académiques; President of the joint Research Committee on Political Sociology of the International Political Science Association and the International Sociological Association; previously professor at University of California, Berkeley	?
Robert von Mohl (1799–1875)	Jurisprudent	1848–1861	Coined the term of a Rechtsstaat as opposed to an aristocratic police state; knighted in 1837; peerage in 1871	?
Dieter Nohlen (1939)	Political Scientist	1974–2005	Author of Elections in the Americas: A Data Handbook; Sistemas electorales y partidos políticos,; Elections and Electoral Systems; Handbook of the Third World; 1991 Max Planck Research Laureate	?
Severo Ochoa (1903–1995)	Physician	1937	1959 Physiology or Medicine Nobel laureate "for the discovery of the mechanisms in the biological synthesis of ribonucleic acid and deoxyribonucleic acid"	?
Kaspar Olevianus (1536–1587)	Theologian	1560–1576 (on faculty 1561–1562)	Significant covenant theologian and Calvinist church organizer during the Second Reformation	?
Martin Opitz (1597–1639)	Poet	1619–1624	Author of Dafne, the first German opera; leader of the Heidelber School of Poetry	?
Frank R. Pfetsch (1936)	Political Scientist	1999–	Co-founder of the Heidelberg Institute for International Conflict Research; Commissioner of the European Consortium for Political Research; Chaire Elie Halevy and Chaire Alfred Grosser at the Institut d'Études Politiques de Paris; Jean Monnet Professor at Heidelberg	?
Enea Silvio Piccolomini (1405–1464)	Theologian	1442–1449	Pope Pius II; chancellor of the university	?
Samuel von Pufendorf (1632–1694)	Jurisprudent	1661–1668	Pioneer in international law; influential commentaries and revisions of the natural law	?
Georg Hermann Quincke (1834–1924)	Physicist	1875–1907	Classical investigations of all capillary phenomena; important work in the experimental study of the reflection of light and influence of electric forces upon the constants; DCL honoris causa from Oxford University; LLD honoris causa from Cambridge University	?
Gerhard von Rad (1901–1971)	Theologian	1949–1971	Major contribution to Old Testament studies; author of Theology of the Old Testament; The Problem of the Hexateuch and other Essays; God at work in Israel; Genesis: A Commentary; Deuteronomy: A Commentary	?
Gustav Radbruch (1878–1949)	Jurisprudent	1926–1933; 1945–1949	Major proponent of a renewal of natural law as opposed to the then predominant legal positivism; author of "Rechtsphilosophie", still one of the most important works on legal philosophy in Germany	?
Johann Reuchlin (1455–1522)	Humanist Scholar	1492–1498	Most influential representative of platonism; founder of the newer German Drama; author of De Arte Cabalistica	?
Johann Carl Otto Ribbeck (1827–1898)	Classical Scholar	1862–1887	Authority on ancient Roman poetry; editor of Ars Poetica of Horace and the Satires of Juvenal	?
Heinrich Rickert (1863–1936)	Philosopher	1915–1932	Co-founder and leader of the Baden school of neo-Kantians	?
Erwin Rohde (1845–1898)	Classical Scholar	1878–1898	Author of Psyche: The Cult of Souls and the Belief in Immortality among the Greeks	?
Rudy Rucker (1946– )	Novelist and mathematician	1978–1980	Founder of the cyberpunk literary movement; author of The Fourth Dimension; the Ware Tetralogy, White Light, Master of Space and Time, Spaceland, Mathematicians in Love;	?
Bert Sakmann (1942– )	Physician	1988–	1991 Physiology or Medicine Nobel laureate "for the discoveries concerning the function of single ion channels in cells"	?
Friedrich Carl von Savigny (1779–1861)	Jurisprudent	?	Founder of the German Historical School of Law; High Chancellor of Justice of Prussia; celebrated authority on Roman Law; co-founder of the University of Berlin	?
Paul Schede (1539–1602)	Diplomat and Humanist Scholar	?	Imperial Ambassador to France, Switzerland, England and Italy; director of the Bibliotheca Palatina	?
Edmund Schlink (1903–1984)	Theologian	1946–1971	Influential authority on Lutheran systematic theology and advocate of Ecumenism; author of The Victor Speaks, Theology of the Lutheran Confessions, The Coming Christ and the Coming Church, The Doctrine of Baptism, The Vision of the Pope	?
Friedrich Christoph Schlosser (1776–1861)	Historian	1819–1861	Author of World History and World History for the German People; teacher of Georg Gottfried Gervinus; "Guide of the Nation" in political history.	?
Manfred G. Schmidt (1948– )	Political Scientist	1997–	Author of Political Institutions in the Federal Republic of Germany and of The Welfare State; 1995 Leibniz Laureate; ranked as the third most influential political scientist in Germany, and as the most important researcher in comparative politics in Germany by the German Research Foundation	?
Herbert Seifert (1907–1969)	Mathematician	1935–1975	Eponym of Seifert fiber space, Seifert surface, Seifert-van Kampen theorem, Seifert conjecture, Seifert–Weber space	?
Gerd Spittler (1939)	Ethnologist	1939		?
Paul Stäckel (1862–1919)	Mathematician	1913–1919	Groundbreaking work in differential geometry, number theory, and non-Euclidean geometry. Coined the term twin prime	?
Dolf Sternberger (1907–1989)	Political Scientist	1947–1985	One of the founders of political science in post-war Germany; developed the "Concept of Citizenship in German Political Contemporary Thought"; coined the term "constitutional patriotism"; Chairman of the German Society for Political Science	?
Gerd Theissen (1943– )	Theologian	?	Pioneer in the application of the principles and methods of sociology to the study of the New Testament; 2002 Burkitt Medalist	?
Anton Friedrich Justus Thibaut (1772–1840)	Jurisprudent	1805–1840	Re-introduced the ancient Roman Pandectists system which allowed the creation of the German Civil Code	?
Ernst Troeltsch (1865–1923)	Theologian	1894–1914	Author of The Social Teachings of the Christian Church; developed an acclaimed system of philosophy of religion by synthesizing the conceptions of Max Weber and Neo-Kantianism; member of the democratic circle around Max Weber	?
Zacharias Ursinus (1534–1583)	Theologian	1561–1576	Reformer and intellectual mastermind during Protestant Reformation; Principal author of the Heidelberg Catechism	
Klaus Vogel (1930–2007)	Jurisprudent	1966–1977	Internationally acknowledged authority in international taxation; member of the Permanent Scientific Committee of the International Fiscal Association	?
Johann Heinrich Voss (1751–1826)	Poet	1805–1826	Author of Wine, Women and Song; published the first German translations of the Odyssey, Hesiod, Theocritus, Bion and Moschus, Virgil, Horace, Tibullus, Propertius, and Shakespear	?
George Wald (1906–1997)	Biologist	1933	1967 Physiology or Medicine Nobel laureate "for the discoveries concerning the primary physiological and chemical visual processes in the eye"	?
Max Weber (1864–1920)	Sociologist	1896–1919	Founder of modern sociology; author of The Protestant Ethic and the Spirit of Capitalism, Politics as a Vocation, The Religion of China: Confucianism and Taoism, The Religion of India: The Sociology of Hinduism and Buddhism, Ancient Judaism, The History of Medieval Business Organisations, The Roman Agrarian History and its Significance for Public and Private Law; widely considered the all-time most important German sociologist	
Alfred Weber (1868–1958)	Political Economist	1907–1933	Leader in intellectual resistance during Nazi era; developed the Least Cost Theory; eponym of the Alfred Weber Institute for Economy at Heidelberg	?
Claus Westermann (1909–2000)	Theologian	1958–1978	Leading German Old Testament scholar; author of The Human in the Old Testament	?
Wilhelm Windelband (1848–1915)	Philosopher	1903–1915	Co-founder of the Baden School; author of History Of Ancient Philosophy, History of Philosophy, An Introduction to Philosophy, Theories in Logic	?
Bernhard Windscheid (1817–1892)	Jurisprudent	1871–1892	Co-author of the German Civil Code; knighted in 1868	?
Georg Wittig (1897–1987)	Chemist	1956–1980	1979 Chemistry Nobel laureate "for the development of the use of boron- and phosphorus-containing compounds, respectively, into important reagents in organic synthesis"; eponym of the Wittig reaction; honorary doctorate of the Sorbonne	?
Rüdiger Wolfrum (1941–)	Jurisprudent	1993–present	President of the International Tribunal for the Law of the Sea; Director of the Heidelberg Max Planck Institute for International Law; Vice President of the German Research Foundation; Vice President of the Max Planck Society; United Nations mediator in the Darfur conflict; Great Cross of Merit of the Federal Republic of Germany in 2008	
Karl Salomo Zachariae (1769–1843)	Jurisprudent	1807–1829	Created a reformation the Baden Criminal Code and the Baden Constitution;	?
Karl Ziegler (1898–1973)	Chemist	–1936	1963 Chemistry Nobel laureate "for the discoveries in the field of the chemistry and technology of high polymers"; eponym of the Ziegler–Natta catalyst	?
