= Harnisch =

Harnisch is a German surname. Notable people with the surname include:

- Henning Harnisch (born 1968), German basketball player
- Klaus Harnisch (born 1933), German director
- Pete Harnisch (born 1966), American baseball player
- Rachel Harnisch (born 1973), Swiss singer
- Ruth Ann Harnisch (born 1950), American presenter and activist
- Sebastian Harnisch (born 1967), German political scientist
- Thomas Harnisch (born 1947), American politician and lawyer
- Wilhelm Harnisch, Australian chief executive
