= Christoph Michalski =

German surgeon

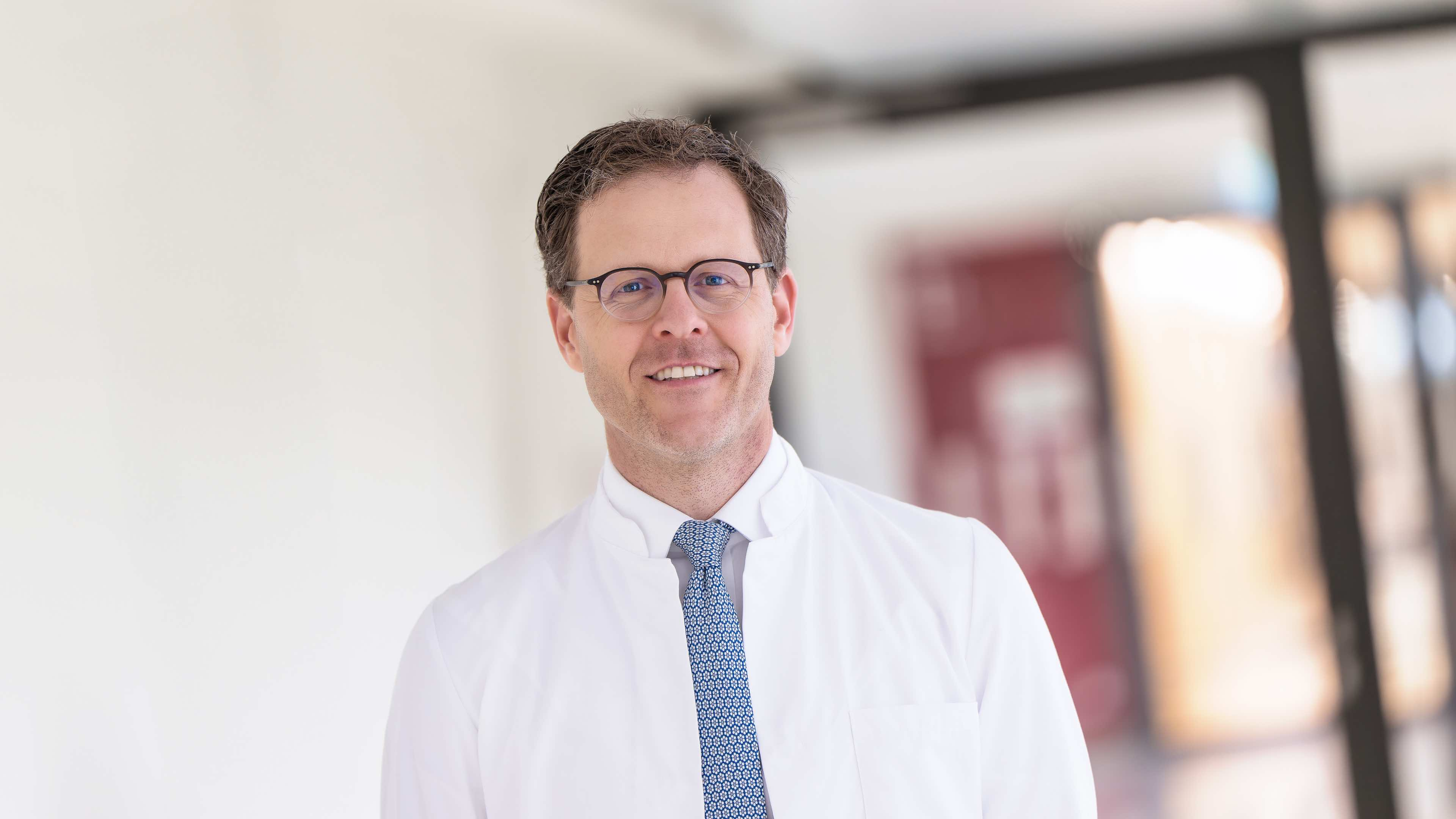
- Christoph Michalski
- Born: 1977 (age 48–49)
- Occupations: Physician, professor

Christoph Michalski (born 1977) is a German surgeon. He is Director of the Department of General, Abdominal, and Transplant Surgery at Heidelberg University Hospital. He is a full Professor of Surgery and Chair of General Surgery at Heidelberg University.

== Life and academic career ==
After completing his Abitur in 1997, Michalski studied medicine in Heidelberg. Following clerkships in England, the United States, and Switzerland, Michalski received his medical licence in 2004. He began his residency at Heidelberg University Hospital and the Department of Surgery of Technical University of Munich, where he headed the pancreas research laboratory. He completed a surgical oncology fellowship at Oregon Health and Science University in Portland before returning to Heidelberg University Hospital in 2014.

There, he worked as a staff surgeon before becoming attending surgeon. He was promoted to assistant professor at Heidelberg University Hospital. In 2018, he moved to University Hospital Halle (Saale), where he served as senior attending surgeon. In October 2020, Michalski took over the chair of general surgery at University of Ulm and became Director of the Department of General Surgery at University Hospital Ulm. Since 2023, Michalski has been professor of surgery and chair of the Department of General Surgery at Heidelberg University Hospital.

== Research ==
As a surgeon, Michalski specializes primarily in complex tumour surgery, transplant surgery, and modern minimally invasive procedures, such as robot-assisted surgery. His research focuses particularly on pancreatic carcinogenesis, pancreatic carcinoma, and surgical oncology, as well as digital applications in surgery. Additionally, he conducts clinical studies on surgery and multimodality therapy of gastrointestinal tumour diseases.

== Publications (selection) ==
- Kong, B., Cheng, T., Qian, C., Michalski, C. W. et al. (2015). Pancreas-specific activation of mTOR and loss of p53 induce tumors reminiscent of acinar cell carcinoma. Molecular Cancer, 14, 212. doi:10.1186/s12943-015-0483-1. PMID 26683340.
- Kong, B., Wu, W., Cheng, T., Michalski, C. W. et al. (2016). A subset of metastatic pancreatic ductal adenocarcinomas depends quantitatively on oncogenic Kras/Mek/Erk-induced hyperactive mTOR signalling. Gut, 65(4), 647–657. doi:10.1136/gutjnl-2014-307616. PMID 25601637.
- Heckler, M., Michalski, C. W., Schaefle, S., Kaiser, J., Büchler, M. W., & Hackert, T. (2017). The Sendai and Fukuoka consensus criteria for the management of branch duct IPMN — A meta-analysis on their accuracy. Pancreatology: official journal of the International Association of Pancreatology (IAP) ... [et al.], 17(2), 255–262. doi:10.1016/j.pan.2017.01.011. PMID 28189431.
- Kong, B., Bruns, P., Behler, N. A., Michalski, C. W. et al.(2018). Dynamic landscape of pancreatic carcinogenesis reveals early molecular networks of malignancy. Gut, 67(1), 146–156. doi:10.1136/gutjnl-2015-310913. PMID 27646934.
- Cheng, T., Zhang, Z., Jian, Z., Raulefs, S., Schlitter, A. M., Steiger, K., Maeritz, N., Zhao, Y., Shen, S., Zou, X., Ceyhan, G. O., Friess, H., Kleeff, J., Michalski, C. W., & Kong, B. (2019). Ductal obstruction promotes formation of preneoplastic lesions from the pancreatic ductal compartment. International Journal of Cancer, 144(10), 2529–2538. doi:10.1002/ijc.31981. PMID 30412288.
- Tanaka, M., Heckler, M., Liu, B., Heger, U., Hackert, T., & Michalski, C. W. (2019). Cytologic Analysis of Pancreatic Juice Increases Specificity of Detection of Malignant IPMN-A Systematic Review. Clinical Hastroenterology and Hepatology: the official clinical practice journal of the American Gastroenterological Association, 17(11), 2199–2211.e21. doi:10.1016/j.cgh.2018.12.034. PMID 30630102.
- Zhang, Z., Li, H., Deng, Y., Kong, B. & Michalski, C. W. et al. (2021). AGR2-Dependent Nuclear Import of RNA Polymerase II Constitutes a Specific Target of Pancreatic Ductal Adenocarcinoma in the Context of Wild-Type p53. Gastroenterology, 161(5), 1601–1614.e23. doi:10.1053/j.gastro.2021.07.030. PMID 34303658.
