= Klaus Vogel =

Klaus Vogel (1930 in Hamburg, Germany – 2007), was widely recognized as an academic expert on the aspects of international taxation, particularly on tax treaties. He is regarded as having been an authority on the interpretation of double tax treaties.

Vogel completed his studies in law in 1957 at the University of Hamburg. He taught constitutional, administrative and tax law at the University of Hamburg and the University of Erlangen–Nuremberg, where he became full Professor of Tax Law in 1964, and Heidelberg University where he became Professor of Public Law in 1966. From 1977, he was Professor of Public Law at LMU Munich where he became Emeritus Professor in 1996. He was also Director of the Research Center for Foreign and International Financial Tax Law there.

In the early 1970s, he was a judge at the Higher Administrative Court of Baden-Württemberg. He has published 15 books and about 200 articles. From 1974 to 1990 he was a member of the Permanent Scientific Committee of the IFA.

Vogel wrote Double Taxation Conventions published by Wolters Kluwer.
