= Norbert Frey =

German cardiologist (born 1966)

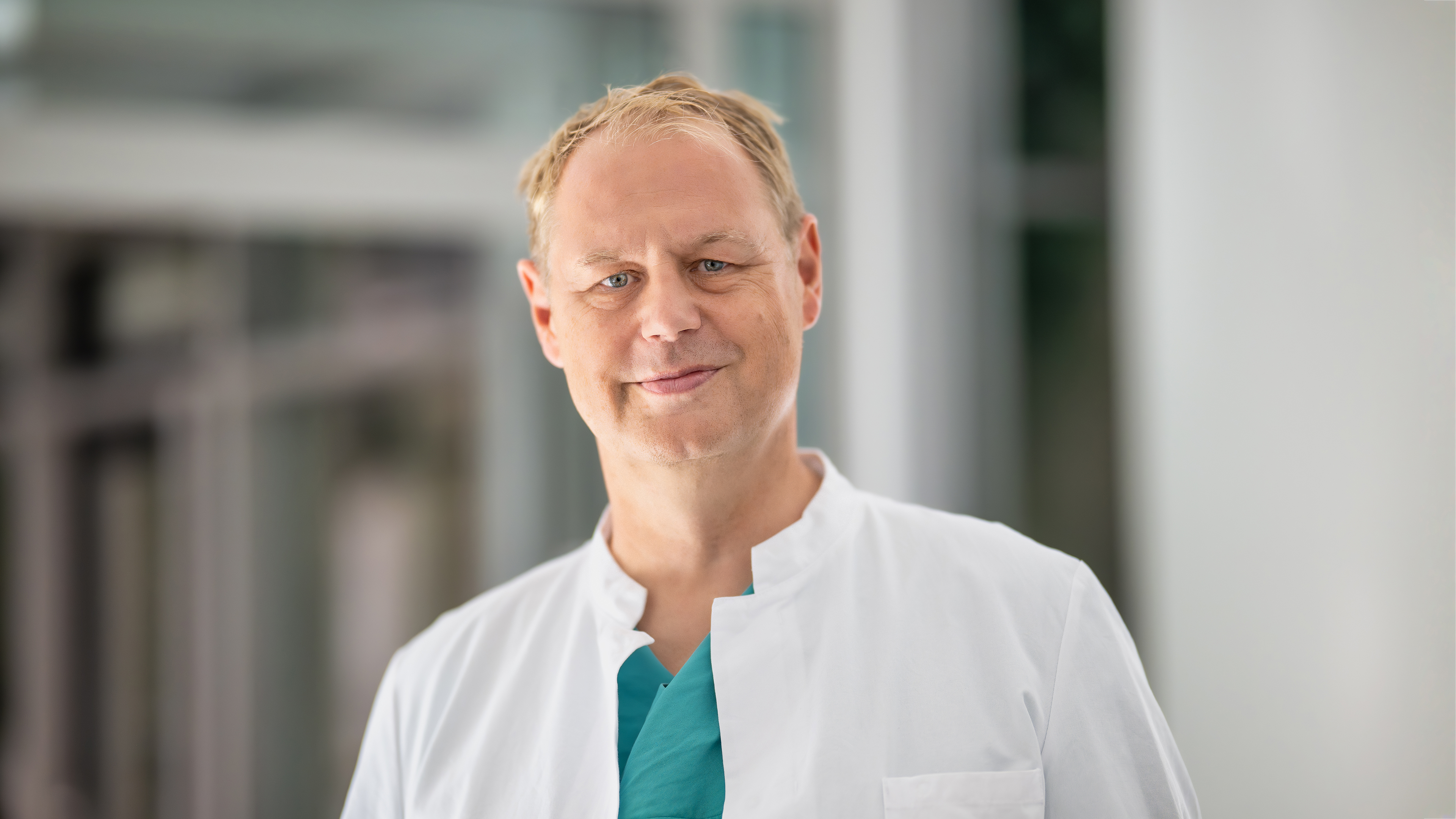
- Norbert Frey in 2024
- Born: October 15, 1966 (age 60); Braunschweig
- Occupation: Full professor at the University Hospital Heidelberg

Norbert Frey (born 15 October 1966) is a German cardiologist and university professor. Since October 2020, he has been the Medical Director of the Department of Cardiology, Angiology, and Pneumology at University Hospital Heidelberg.

== Life ==
Frey was born in Braunschweig in 1966. He studied Human Medicine from 1987 to 1994 at the Christian-Albrechts University of Kiel, Johns Hopkins University in Baltimore, and Georgetown University in Washington, D.C.

He obtained his Doctor of Medicine in Pharmacology in 1994 and subsequently began his residency as an assistant physician at the Department for Internal Medicine III (Cardiology) at University Hospital Heidelberg under the supervision of Wolfgang Kübler. He continued his postgraduate training in 1996 at the Department of Internal Medicine II at University Hospital Lübeck under Hugo A. Katus.

With a scholarship from the German Research Foundation (DFG), Frey conducted scientific research in molecular cardiology at the Southwestern Medical Center of the University of Texas at Dallas under the supervision of E. N. Olson. After his research stay, he returned to the Department of Cardiology at University Hospital Heidelberg in 2002, now led by Hugo A. Katus. Here, Frey led the Molecular Cardiology research group and obtained his habilitation in 2006. From 2007, he held the position of Deputy Medical Director until receiving a call for a W3 professorship at the Department of Internal Medicine III (Cardiology, Angiology, and Intensive care medicine) at University Medical Center Schleswig-Holstein in Kiel in 2008, where he remained as medical director until 2020.

Since October 2020, he has been the medical director of the Department of Internal Medicine III (Cardiology, Angiology, Pneumology) at University Hospital Heidelberg, succeeding Hugo A. Katus.

== Academic work ==
Frey's research as a scientist focused on molecular mechanisms influencing the development and progression of cardiomyopathies and heart failure.

As part of an international research group, he identified a protein family called "Calsarcins" and characterized their influence on myocardial contractility.

Frey is also a spokesperson for the Academy of the German Cardiac Society (DGK), a member of the Research Coordinating Committee of the German Center for Cardiovascular Research, and an editor of the journal Clinical Research in Cardiology.

== Publications ==
- Frey, N; Barrientos, T; Shelton, JM; Frank, D; Rütten, H; Gehring, D; Kuhn, C; Lutz, M; Rothermel, B; Bassel-Duby, R; Richardson, J A.; Katus, H A.; Hill, JA; Olson, EN (2004). "Mice lacking calsarcin-1 are sensitized to calcineurin signaling and show accelerated cardiomyopathy in response to pathological biomechanical stress". Nat Med. 10 (12): 1336–43. doi:10.1038/nm1132. PMID 15543153.
- Frank, D; Kuhn, C; van Eickels, M; Gehring, D; Hanselmann, C; Lippl, S; Will, R; Katus, HA; Frey, N (2007). "Calsarcin-1 protects against angiotensin-II induced cardiac hypertrophy". Circulation. 116 (22): 2587–96. doi:10.1161/CIRCULATIONAHA.107.711317. PMID 18025526.
- Frey, N; Frank, D; Lippl, S; Kuhn, C; Kögler, H; Barrientos, T; Rohr, C; Will, R; Müller, OJ; Weiler, H; Bassel-Duby, R; Katus, HA; Olson, EN (2008). "Calsarcin-2 deficiency increases exercise capacity in mice through calcineurin/NFAT activation". J Clin Invest. 118 (11): 3598–608. doi:10.1172/JCI36277. PMC 2564612. PMID 18846255.
- Eden, M; Meder, B; Völkers, M; Poomvanicha, M; Domes, K; Branchereau, M; Marck, P; Will, R; Bernt, A; Rangrez, A; Busch, M; Hrabě; de Angelis, M; Heymes, C; Rottbauer, W; Most, P; Hofmann, F; Frey, N (2016). "Myoscape controls cardiac calcium cycling and contractility via regulation of L-type calcium channel surface expression". Nat Commun. 7 11317. doi:10.1315/11317 (inactive 25 August 2025). PMC 5438100. PMID 27122098.
- Rott, N; Scholz, KH; Busch, HJ; Frey, N; Kelm, M; Thiele, H; Böttiger, BW. (2021). "Criteria for the certification of Cardiac Arrest Centers in Germany". Resuscitation. 169: 1–3. doi:10.1016/j.resuscitation.2021.09.034. PMID 34627867.
- Lehmann, LH; Stein, F; Jäger, D; Frey, N. (2022). "The Heidelberg cardio-oncology unit (COUNT)-a possible blueprint for improved care of cardio-oncological patients". Clinical Research in Cardiology. 111 (2): 227–229. doi:10.1007/s00392-021-01894-z. PMC 8817047. PMID 34181066.
- Hilgendorf, I; Backs, J; Baldus, S; Chen, J; Duncker, D; El-Armouche, A; Frey, N; Hilfiker-Kleiner, D; Johnson, V; Künzel, S; Wollert, KC; Zeiher, A; Sager, HB (2022). "Clinician Scientists in der kardiovaskulären Medizin". Kardiologie. 17: 6–11. doi:10.1007/s12181-022-00582-0.

== Awards ==
- 1999: Oskar Lapp Award, German Cardiac Society
- 1999–2001: Research grant by the German Research Foundation (DFG) at the Southwestern Medical Center of the University of Texas at Dallas
- 2005: Franz-Maximilian-Groedel-Prize, German Cardiac Society
- 2009: Arthur Weber Prize, German Cardiac Society
- 2018: Fritz Acker Foundation Prize, German Cardiac Society
