= Thomas Caute Reynolds =

American politician (1821–1887)

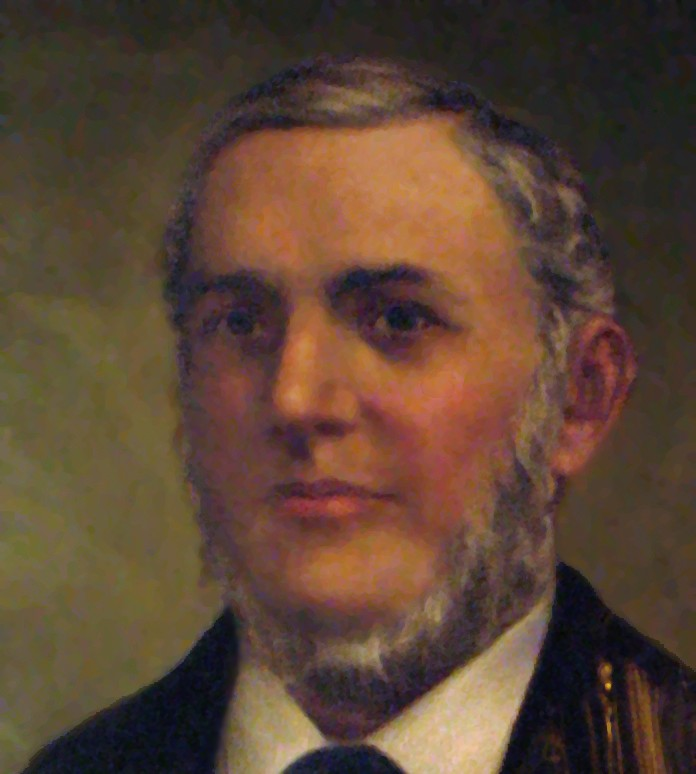

Governor of Missouri (Confederate)
- In exile
- In office December 6, 1862 – May 26, 1865
- Preceded by: Claiborne F. Jackson
- Succeeded by: Office abolished

11th Lieutenant Governor of Missouri
- In office January 3, 1861 – July 31, 1861; In exile July 31, 1861 – December 6, 1862
- Governor: Claiborne F. Jackson
- Preceded by: Hancock L. Jackson
- Succeeded by: Willard P. Hall

Personal details
- Born: October 11, 1821 Charleston, South Carolina, U.S.
- Died: March 30, 1887 (aged 65) St. Louis, Missouri, U.S.
- Cause of death: Suicide by jumping
- Resting place: Calvary Cemetery, St. Louis, Missouri, U.S. 38°42′12.2″N 90°14′17.4″W
- Party: Democratic
- Spouse: Heloise Marie Sprague
- Education: University of Virginia (LL.B.); Heidelberg University (LL.D.)

Thomas Caute Reynolds (October 11, 1821 – March 30, 1887) was the Confederate governor of Missouri from 1862 to 1865, succeeding upon the death of Claiborne F. Jackson after serving as lieutenant governor in exile. In 1864 he returned to the state, but was forced back into exile after the Battle of Westport.

Reynolds was elected lieutenant governor in 1860 as a Douglas Democrat, privately supporting the right to own slaves. When the Confederacy began to take shape in 1861, President Davis viewed the leaders of neutral Missouri with suspicion and initially refused to send military aid, so enabling the Union to dominate the state. Missouri's Confederate government fled to Arkansas, and Reynolds became demoralized and went to work in Richmond. Upon Governor Jackson's death from cancer on December 6, 1862, Reynolds started planning the liberation of Missouri with Confederate Major-General Sterling Price. The planned expedition took place in 1864, but achieved nothing. After the American Civil War Reynolds fled to Mexico, returning to St. Louis in 1869. He jumped to his death there in 1887.

== Early life and education ==
Reynolds was born in Charleston, South Carolina, and graduated from the University of Virginia in 1838 and received a doctor of laws degree, graduating summa cum laude, from Heidelberg University in 1842. He was admitted to the Virginia Bar in 1844 and served as a chargé d'affaires in Madrid before moving to St. Louis, Missouri, in 1850. There he opened a law practice, served as United States Attorney, and rose in the Democratic Party, joining the anti-Benton wing when the party split over Senator Thomas Hart Benton’s failure to support the Southern side of the national debate in the late 1840s and early 1850s.

Reynolds was fluent in German, as was his French-born wife. Early on in St. Louis, he had good relations with the influential German community. Republicans, however, consciously and aggressively pursued a Free Soil policy that fed on white fears that slavery and the Democratic Party would serve to debase white labor as it was forced to compete with slave labor. Reynolds, as a proslavery Democrat, lost the support of the German community and the Republican editor of the Missouri Democrat, Gratz Brown particularly drew Reynolds’ ire.

Reynolds challenged Brown to a duel in March 1855. This duel never happened, however, as Brown chose "the common American Rifle with open sights, round ball not over one ounce, at eighty yards." Reynolds refused the terms because his short-sightedness would have put him at a severe disadvantage in making an accurate shot. The public attacks continued and Brown, chafing under Reynolds' accusations of cowardice for his manipulation to avoid the original duel, finally issued a challenge. Reynolds chose the more traditional dueling pistols and on August 26, 1856, the duel occurred on Bloody Island. Brown was shot in the leg (and was to walk with a limp for the rest of his life) while Reynolds was unscathed. Both returned to the political fray and Brown would serve as Governor of Missouri from 1871 to 1873.

== Lieutenant Governor of Missouri ==
In 1860, Reynolds defeated Constitutional Union Party candidate T. J. C. Fagg to win election as lieutenant governor, serving along with Governor Claiborne F. Jackson, and assuming office in early 1861. The team, aware of the strong free soil sentiments of important factions of the Missouri electorate, had run as Douglas Democrats.

Reynolds was an early leader of the secessionists in Missouri. On January 4, 1861, soon after his native South Carolina seceded, he called a meeting of secessionists in Jefferson City and began to help organize the Minutemen secessionist paramilitary organization at the same time Unionist companies, the "Home Guard" were being organized by Missouri Congressman Frank Blair Jr. On January 8, Reynolds addressed a public meeting that adopted a resolution which said, in part, "We pledge Missouri to a hearty co-operation with our sister Southern States … for our mutual protection, against the encroachments of Northern fanaticism, and the co-ercion of the Federal Government." On January 17, 1861, he made an influential speech before the Missouri Senate that led the way to the call for a state convention to consider secession.

At the beginning of the American Civil War, Missouri adopted a position that it would remain in the Union, but would not send troops or supplies to either side. Governor Jackson refused the call from President Lincoln to supply troops to the Union, and the Missouri General Assembly established the Missouri State Guard under Sterling Price to resist attempts to force the state to comply. Following the Camp Jackson Affair, when Union military troops and civilians clashed over the arrest of the Missouri Volunteer Militia, Price, Jackson, and Reynolds met on May 14, 1861, to discuss strategy. All appeared to agree with Reynolds that the best course was to organize the entire state militarily to resist any attempt by Lyons to occupy the state capital. On May 20 Price dispatched Reynolds to Richmond in order to secure a guarantee from Davis to protect the state secession convention if reconvened.

However the next day, Federal authorities under William S. Harney reached a cease-fire arrangement with Jackson and Price in the Price-Harney Truce. Reynolds, when he heard about the truce through the newspapers, was upset and feared that Price was reverting to Unionism.

Unionists such as Frank Blair also opposed the truce, and President Lincoln authorized Blair to overrule the agreement and relieve Harney of command. Harney's successor, Nathaniel Lyon, accompanied by Frank Blair, met with Governor Jackson and Price on June 11. Lyon demanded that the state government cooperate in suppressing the Southern rebellion, and that it permit federal military activities beyond the city limits of St. Louis. Jackson and Price would only agree to preserve order in the state and resist any Confederate incursions into the state as long as Lyon agreed to disband loyal Home Guards organizations (including the 1st-5th U.S. Reserve Corps) and restrict Federal troops to metropolitan St. Louis. No agreement was reached. Jackson and Price left immediately for the state capital and the next day Jackson issued a proclamation describing the meeting and calling for fifty thousand volunteers to defend the state. Lyon's reaction was to move immediately against the forces of Governor Jackson.

On June 3, Reynolds had sent a letter to President Davis requesting that a Confederate army be sent to occupy Missouri, and on June 21 Reynolds and Edward C. Cabell, a representative sent separately by Governor Jackson, met with Davis in Richmond. Davis had his own concerns about the loyalty of Price and Jackson after the truce with Harney and their apparent willingness, based on the June 12 proclamation to resist the Confederacy. Davis declined to send troops until Missouri had actually seceded. According to Reynolds, Davis stated:

I think General Lyon acted very unwisely in not accepting Governor Jackson’s proposals, and Mr. Lincoln may send him orders to accept them. Governor Jackson in his proclamation makes a merit of having proposed them; now if I agree to send Confederate troops into Missouri at your request, can you give me any guarantee that Mr. Lincoln may not propose and Governor Jackson assent to the agreement rejected by General Lyon, and compel those troops to retire before their joint forces?

Davis did, however, authorize Benjamin McCulloch to provide any necessary military assistance to Missouri consistent with protecting Arkansas and the Indian Territory.

Lyon occupied the state capital in Jefferson City, Missouri in July 1861. The state constitutional convention was reconvened without the presence of pro-Southern representatives, and they declared the offices of Missouri governor and lieutenant governor vacant. Hamilton R. Gamble was appointed provisional governor, and Willard P. Hall was named lieutenant governor.

Jackson and Reynolds, along with other pro-secession politicians such as David R. Atchison, maintaining they were still the elected government of the state, fled to the southwest corner of the state by Springfield, Missouri where Lyon was killed in the Battle of Wilson's Creek. Jackson and Reynolds convened the pro-South elected government in Neosho, Missouri and voted the Missouri secession to secede from the Union. Unable to defend themselves in the state, the government eventually moved to Marshall, Texas.

== American Civil War ==
By December 1861 President Davis was trying to select an overall leader for Confederate forces in Missouri, Texas, and Arkansas. Jackson, Reynolds, and the Missouri Congressional delegation all lobbied for Sterling Price. Davis had concerns about Price based on his misunderstandings with McCulloch and his early support for neutrality. Davis was also unwilling to place in command of the area any general from the states of Missouri, Texas, or Arkansas—fearing that their objectivity for the entire Confederate war effort would be blinded by local concerns. After first offering the position to Henry Heth and Braxton Bragg, Mississippian Earl Van Dorn was eventually selected. The issue of local versus national control of Missouri troops did materialize after the Battle of Pea Ridge when Price's troops, over the troops' and Price's objections, were ordered across the Mississippi – Price would eventually return to fight for Missouri but his troops would not.

Reynolds returned to Richmond to work with its Congressional delegation but eventually became frustrated with his inability to contribute. In April 1862 he returned to his family estate in Winnsborough, South Carolina. His active role in the war resumed and took on new importance, however, when he learned in December 1862 that Governor Jackson had died and that he was now governor.

After the Battle of Corinth, Price had been strongly lobbying the Richmond government to return to Missouri with his troops. In late January 1863 Price went to Richmond to make his case, and Reynolds joined him there in his first act as governor. Both Price and Reynolds were concerned that with Missouri totally occupied by the Union any peace treaty might exclude Missouri from the Confederacy. Meeting with Davis and secretary of War James Seddon, the Missourians received the immediate assignment of Price west of the Mississippi with his troops to follow when circumstances warranted. Reynolds also received a letter designating him as an unofficial advisor to Generals Kirby Smith and Theophilus H. Holmes and an agreement from Davis to consult Reynolds before the appointment of any general officers.

From this point on, despite an outwardly cordial appearance, the relationship between Reynolds and Price would deteriorate. In September 1863 forces under Price abandoned Little Rock, Arkansas, and Reynolds noted that "General Holmes and all the general officers under Price at Little Rock, except General Frost, considered the evacuation a blunder, and that Steele could have been beaten back with great disaster to him.". He did support and encourage the replacement of Holmes but he lobbied with the President to replace him with Simon B. Buckner rather than Price whom he considered (in Castel's words) "devious, insincere, petulant, and arrogant" and "impulsive, tactless, and prone to indiscreet and exaggerated language."

Reynolds tried to exert his influence, backed up by his personal relationship with Jefferson Davis, over the civil and military decisions in the Trans-Mississippi Department. He brought some order to the records of the government which he had inherited from Governor Jackson but early on had differences with Price over the disbursement of the dwindling state treasury. The split became open and public when Reynolds appointed Colonel L. M. Lewis to the Confederate Senate to replace Price favorite and Davis critic, incumbent John B. Clark.

As long as Missouri remained in Union hands, Reynolds remained a governor without an actual state to govern. Reynolds' final chance to become governor in fact occurred in October 1864 when he accompanied General Price in his raid back into Missouri. While both Price and Kirby Smith in their official reports painted a positive picture of the raid's accomplishments (i.e. new recruits, railroads and bridges destroyed, prisoners taken, war materials gather), Castel notes:

Finally, neither Kirby Smith nor Price mentioned that the expedition failed to seize St. Louis or occupy Jefferson City and install a Confederate government, failed to bring about a mass uprising of Southern sympathizers, failed to influence state elections except probably to increase the Republican vote, and failed to do any damage to the Union military installations in Kansas. In fact Price failed to achieve a single one of his objectives other than obtain recruits, and he did that only in the imperfect fashion described.

Reynolds was proud of his own participation in the raid, claiming he had "been among the bullets on the battlefield, shared mule meat with the starving, and walked in the retreat". At the same time he blamed Price for the raid's failures which he characterized as nothing but "a weak and disgraceful plundering raid." He was especially incensed at the failure to capture Jefferson City which would have allowed Reynolds to be officially installed as the state's governor. Reynolds complained to Smith in October and in a December 23, 1864, published letter to the Marshall Texas Republican newspaper he thoroughly lambasted Price in the guise of defending two other officers that Reynolds claimed Price was using as scapegoats for his own failures. Reynolds followed this up by sending a copy to Price and asking him to resign from the military. Price responded by requesting that Smith conduct a formal investigation of Price's charges and in a published letter to the Shreveport News denied Reynolds' charges while referring to him as someone "who pretends to be, and styles himself in it [the Texas Republican letter], the Governor of the State of Missouri.

A court of inquiry was held in late April 1865, but it was never concluded due to the end of the war. For the most part, Castel concludes that Reynolds’ specific charges were not supportable and notes that Reynolds in 1887 effectively recanted the most serious charges. Referring to his public charges, Reynolds wrote, "It is against all the canons of history that, made in a heated controversy, they should be used, or even referred to, in stating ‘’facts’’ of that campaign itself."

== Later life ==
Reynolds and a group of refugees including Kirby Smith, Sterling Price, John B. Magruder, and Joseph Shelby, with several hundred of his troops, retreated to Mexico in the summer of 1865. Reynolds took up residence in Mexico City where he served as a railroad commissioner and unofficial adviser to the Emperor Maximilian.

== Death ==
Reynolds killed himself in 1887 by jumping down an elevator shaft at the Customs House in St. Louis. A note with his body indicated he was afraid that he was losing his mental capacity. He is buried at Calvary Cemetery in St. Louis.

== Bibliography ==
- General Sterling Price and the Confederacy (1867)

== See also ==
- List of Heidelberg University people
- List of people from South Carolina
- List of suicides (N–Z)
- List of University of Virginia people

== Notes ==
Party political offices
Preceded by Hancock L. Jackson	Democratic nominee for Lieutenant Governor of Missouri; 1860	Unknown
Political offices
Preceded by Hancock L. Jackson	Lieutenant Governor of Missouri; 1861; In exile 1861–1862	Succeeded by Willard P. Hall
Preceded by Claiborne F. Jackson	Governor of Missouri (Confederate); In exile 1862–1865	Office abolished
New office	Chairman of the Trans-Mississippi Committee of Public Safety; 1863–1865	Office abolished
