= Clinical Research in Cardiology =

- Discipline: Cardiology
- Language: English
- Edited by: Michael Böhm, Hugo A. Katus

Publication details
- Former name(s): Zentralblatt für Herz- und Gefässkrankheiten; Zeitschrift für Kreislaufforschung; Zeitschrift für Kardiologie
- History: 1909-present
- Publisher: Springer Science+Business Media
- Frequency: Monthly
- Impact factor: 5.460 (2020)

Standard abbreviations
- ISO 4: Clin. Res. Cardiol.

Indexing
- CODEN: CRCLCI
- ISSN: 1861-0684 (print); 1861-0692 (web)
- OCLC no.: 229931581

Links
- Journal homepage; Online archive

Clinical Research in Cardiology is a monthly peer-reviewed medical journal covering cardiology.

Its predecessors include the 1909-1926 Zentralblatt für Herz- und Gefässkrankheiten, the 1927-1972 Zeitschrift für Kreislaufforschung, the 1973-2005 Zeitschrift für Kardiologie (German for "Journal of Cardiology"), and it obtained its current name in 2006. It is published by Springer Science+Business Media on behalf of the German Cardiac Society, of which it is the official journal. The editors-in-chief are Michael Bohm and Hugo A. Katus. According to the Journal Citation Reports, the journal has a 2020 impact factor of 5.460.
