= Vera Lüth =

Experimental particle physicist

Vera G. Lüth Professor emerita
- Born: 1943 (age 82–83)
- Spouse: Karl L. Brown

Academic background
- Education: Universitӓt Heidelberg

Vera G. Lüth (born 1943) is an experimental particle physicist and professor emerita at Stanford Linear Accelerator Center (SLAC), Stanford University, in the United States. A senator of the Helmholtz Association, she has worked in particle physics at SLAC since 1974. She is a fellow of the American Physical Society.

== Early life and education ==
Lüth completed her undergraduate education at Mainz University Institute of Physics from 1963 to 1966. In 1969 she completed a Master of Science in physics at Heidelberg University; her Dr. rer. nat. work in particle physics was also completed there from 1966 to 1974, based on research at CERN. Her 1974 dissertation, titled Measurement of the Charge Asymmetry in the Decay K0 --> pi+- e-+ Neutrino as a Function of the K0 Decay Time, was advised by Jack H. Steinberger and Heinz August Adolf Wilhelm Filthuth.

In 1977 she married Karl L. Brown (1925–2002) in Santa Clara County, California.

== Career ==
Lüth was hired at SLAC as a postdoctoral researcher from 1974 to 1984.

She returned to CERN as a scientific associate from 1984 to 1985, working with Jack Steinberger and others to measure charge-parity violation in neutral kaon decay. By 1984, Lüth had joined the permanent faculty at SLAC. Between 1992 and 1994, she was deputy associate director of research at the Superconducting Super Collider (SSC) laboratory in Texas. When construction of the SSC was cancelled, she returned to SLAC as the first technical coordinator for the BaBar detector, with responsibilities for overseeing the detector's design and construction. Upon its completion, she turned her efforts to measuring decay of B mesons. According to Kelen Tuttle, writing for SLAC Today, "Lüth was one of the leading physicists on both the magnetic detector built by SLAC and Lawrence Berkeley National Laboratory and the MARK II detector, which recorded data at SPEAR, the Positron Electron Project and the Stanford Linear Collider. Lüth was also the driving force to build the first detector using silicon microstrips at a colliding beam machine."

In 2004 she was promoted to Professor of Research at SLAC.

Lüth served as a permanent member of the Helmholtz Association's Senate Commission from 2008 to 2011, and in 2011she was appointed a senator of the Helmholtz Association for the research field of the structure of matter. She has participated on numerous advisory committees and panels, including the German Wissenschaftsrat's Large Facilities Panel, and the Department of Energy and National Science Foundation High Energy Physics Advisory Panel.

== Research ==
Lüth has conducted research at CERN in Switzerland, Heidelberg University in Germany, and SLAC. According to SLAC theoretical physicist JoAnne Hewett, "Right from the beginning, Vera showed that every experiment she contributed to was the definitive experiment at the time." Burton Richter said she proved her worth early, "playing an important role at the Stanford Positron Electron Accelerating Ring (SPEAR) during the 'November Revolution,' which launched a new era of particle physics with the discovery of the charm quark". Her research interests have included fundamental symmetries, heavy flavor particle weak decays, silicon vertex detectors, and precision tracking.

In addition to co-authoring more than 700 publications on particle physics, Luth has contributed a historical biography of Wolfgang K. H. Panofsky to the Annual Review of Nuclear and Particle Science.

== Honors ==
Lüth was elected a Fellow of the American Physical Society in 1984, and cited "For Contributions to the discovery of new particles and to the determination of their properties."

She was honored as professor emerita at SLAC in 2010.
