= Rüdiger Hell =

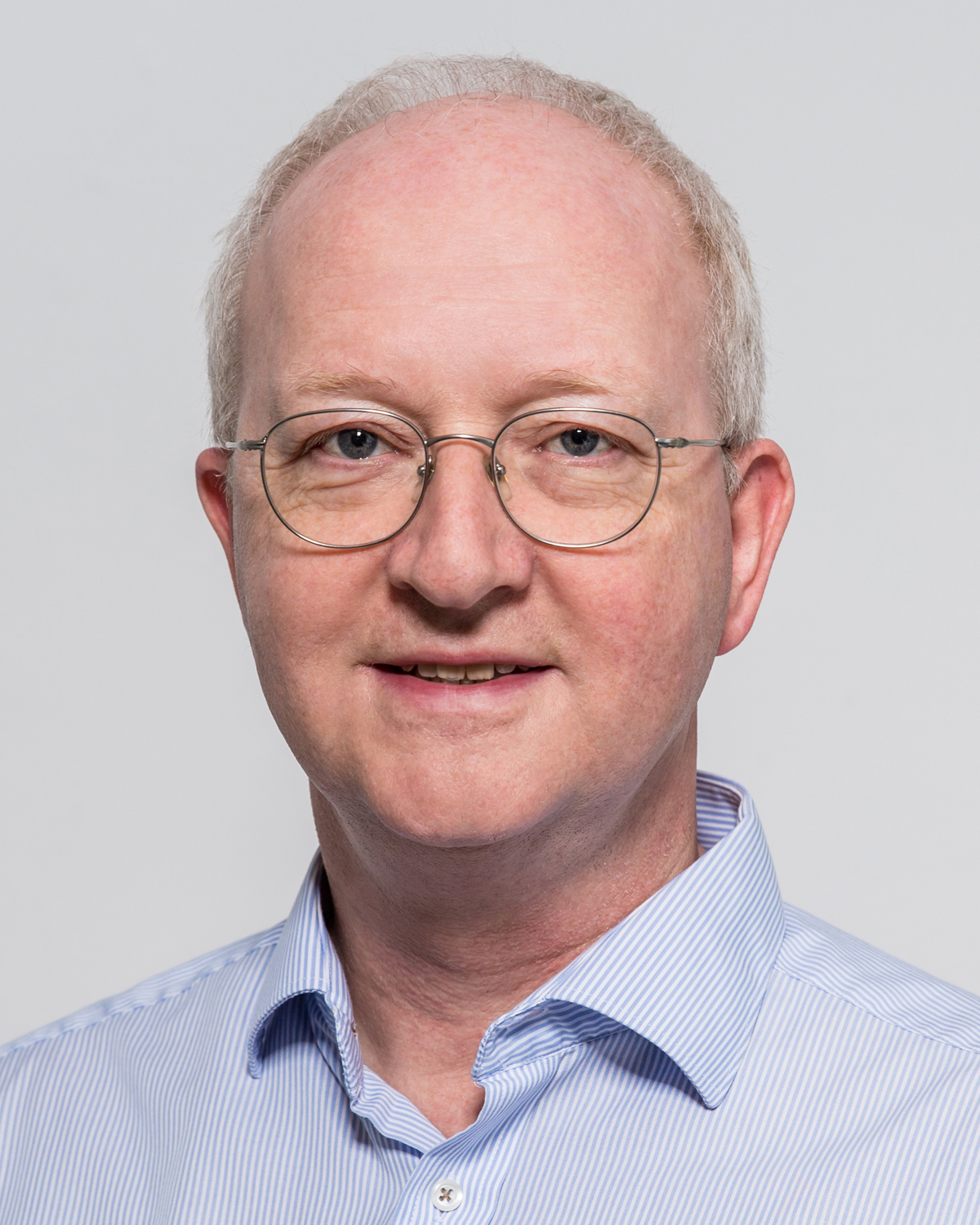
- Born: June 3, 1959 (age 67); Zahmen, Germany
- Occupations: Dean of the Faculty of Biosciences at Heidelberg University, Professor of Biology

Academic background
- Education: University of Cologne

Academic work
- Discipline: Plant molecular biology
- Institutions: Ruhr University Bochum; Leibniz Institute for Plant Genetics and Crop Plant Research; Heidelberg University; University of California, Berkeley

Rüdiger Hell (born June 3, 1959) is a German plant biologist and distinguished professor at the Center for Organismal Studies (COS) at Heidelberg University, Germany.

== Education and career ==
Hell studied biology at the Technische Universität Darmstadt and obtained his doctorate in plant biology from the University of Cologne in 1989 under the supervision of Ludwig Bergmann. He performed a postdoctoral fellowship in the research group of Wilhelm Gruissem in the Department of Plant and Microbial Biology at the University of California, Berkeley, USA, from 1990 to 1993. Subsequently, Hell was appointed as a senior researcher (C1) in the Department of Plant Physiology at the Ruhr University Bochum in Bochum, Germany.

In 1998, he completed his habilitation and obtained the venia legendi for Botany in Bochum. The same year, Hell moved to the Leibniz Institute for Plant Genetics and Crop Plant Research (IPK), Gatersleben, Germany, where he was an independent group leader within the Department of Molecular Cell Biology until 2003.

In 2003, he became a full professor (C4) and chair at Heidelberg University as head of the Department of the Molecular Biology of Plants. Hell acted as Dean of the Faculty of Biosciences at Heidelberg University from 2005 to 2007 and again since 2022. Since 2019, he has been serving as an elected member of the Heidelberg University's academic senate.

Hell has been a member of the German Research Foundation's Review Board for plant sciences from 2016 to 2024 and is also active as a member of the German Society for Plant Sciences.

== Research ==
In his research, Hell integrates biochemistry, cell biology and molecular genetics to answer physiological and organismal questions towards understanding of the adjustment growth of plants in different environments.

Hell's research focuses on the role of metabolism for driving growth in relation to developmental programs and changing environments. He developed the regulation of the metabolism of sulfur into a versatile tool to study plant nutrient sensing, growth control in general and abiotic stress responses. He discovered that the synthesis of the amino acid cysteine forms a metabolic hub for integration of resource availability in the soil (i.e. sulfate) and changing demand for energy and protein translation in response to photosynthesis and stresses, in particular water deficit and heavy metal resistance. He promoted research on the role of protein degradation that is determined by N-terminal protein modifications in the context of proteome stability during environmental stress.

== Selected publications ==
- Hell, R., Mendel, RR., eds. (2010). "Cell biology of metals and nutrients". Plant cell monographs. Heidelberg; New York: Springer. ISBN 978-3-642-10612-5.
- Takahashi, H., Kopriva, S., Giordano, M., Saito, S., Hell, R. (2011). "Sulfur Assimilation in Photosynthetic Organisms: Molecular Functions and Regulations of Transporters and Assimilatory Enzymes". Annual Review of Plant Biology. 62: 157–184.
- Linster, E., Stephan, I., Bienvenut, W.V., Maple-Grødem, J., Myklebust, L.M., Huber, M., Reichelt, M., Sticht, C., Møller, S.G., Meinnel, T., Arnesen, T., Giglione, C., Hell, R., Wirtz, M. (2015). "Proteome imprinting by N-terminal acetylation is a vital hormone-regulated switch during drought stress". Nature Communications. 6.
- Forieri, I., Sticht, C., Reichelt, M., Gretz, N., Hawkesford, M.J., Malagoli, M., Wirtz, M., Hell, R. (2017). "Systems analysis of metabolism and the transcriptome in Arabidopsis thaliana roots reveals differential co-regulation upon iron, sulfur and potassium deficiency". Plant, Cell & Environment. 40: 95–107.
- Sun, SK., Xu, X., Tang, Z., Hell, R. et al (2021). "A molecular switch in sulfur metabolism to reduce arsenic and enrich selenium in rice grain". Nature Communications. 12.
