= Wilhelm Harnisch =

Wilhelm Harnisch is the chief executive officer of Master Builders Australia, the principal Australian Lobby Group for the building and construction industry. He is based in Canberra, Australia.

Mr Harnisch has been with the MBA since 1991 and was involved in the housing industry before that.
