= Karl Zell =

German classical philologist

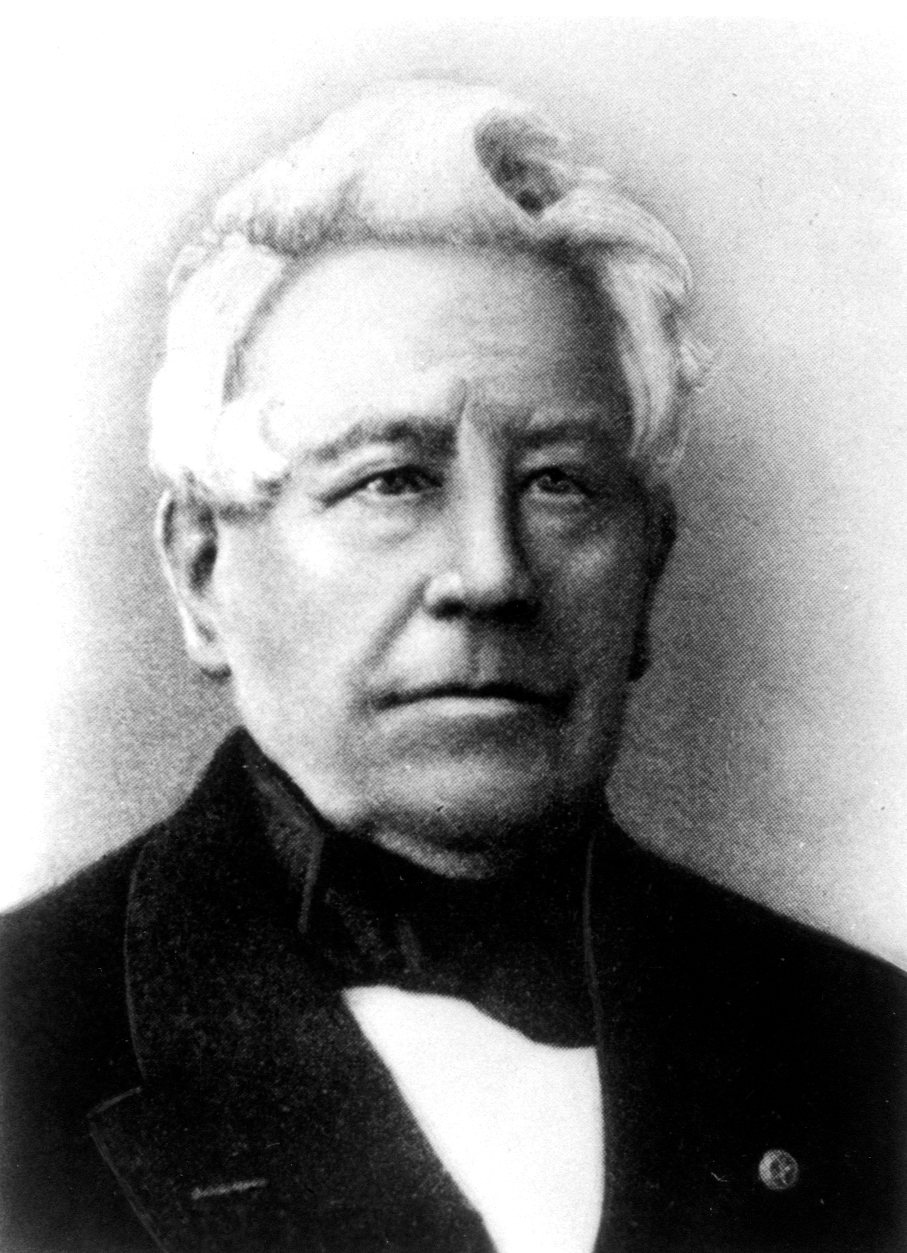
Karl Zell

Karl Zell (8 April 1793 – 24 January 1873) was a German statesman, philologist, and defender of the rights of the Catholic Church.

== Political career ==
He attended the high-school of his native town of Mannheim, and studied philology at the Universities of Heidelberg, Göttingen, and Breslau (1810-1814). In 1814 he became a professor at the lyceum at Rastatt, in 1821 professor of classical philology at the University of Freiburg, where he soon attained prominence by his work as teacher and author. As representative of the university in the Upper Chamber of the Diet of Baden during the years 1831-1835, he advocated a thorough reform of the high-school system of Baden and the establishment of a special board for the supervision and encouragement of the higher studies. The Diet took his suggestion to heart and put Zell on the council to carry the suggestion to completion. In 1848 Zell was elected to the Lower Chamber of the Diet of Baden, in which he was a deputy until 1855.

Through his speeches and writings and without allies Zell defended Church rights. The fame he won for this crusade reached far beyond the boundaries of Baden and led to his election as president of the congresses for Catholic Germany held at Munster in 1852 and at Vienna in 1853.

== Retirement ==
In 1855 Zell retired from the service of the state, and in 1857 settled at Freiburg. In the ecclesiastico-political battles in which Archbishop Hermann Bikari became involved with the Government of Baden for its active adherence to the Kulturkampf policy, Zell was the archbishop's constant adviser and active assistant. As a speaker at assemblies, in pamphlets and articles for periodicals and newspapers, like the "Freiburger Kirchenblatt" and the "Historisch-Politische Blatter", he constantly defended the rights of the Church, Christian schools, religious orders, and argued against criticisms of the Church. A permanent memorial of his labours for the head of the Church is the St. Michael's Association for the Archdiocese of Freiburg, which he founded, in order to organize the gifts of the faithful for the Pope (Peter's pence); the society still flourishes in the archdiocese.

== Writings ==
As an author he wrote on a great variety of subjects, devoting himself especially to Aristotle, Calderón, Shakespeare, and the history of Baden. Works still valuable are:

- "Fereinschriften" (3 vols., Freiburg, 1826–33; new series, 1857);
- "Treatise on St. Lioba" (Freiburg, 1860);
- historical articles for the "Freiburger Diözesanarchiv".
