= Molecular Cancer =

Peer-reviewed scientific journal

- Discipline: Biology
- Language: English
- Edited by: Chi V. Dang

Publication details
- History: 2002–present
- Publisher: Springer Science+Business Media
- Impact factor: 41.444 (2021)

Standard abbreviations
- ISO 4: Mol. Cancer

Indexing
- ISSN: 1476-4598

Links
- Journal homepage; Online archive

Molecular Cancer is a peer-reviewed open-access scientific journal covering all aspects of cancer research.

The journal is published by BioMed Central and was established in 2002. The first editor-in-chief was Chi V. Dang, who is also the scientific director of the Ludwig Institute for Cancer Research. Professor C. Nicot has been editor-in-chief since 2014.

Molecular Cancer publishes research articles, reviews, and commentaries related to cancer biology, molecular oncology, cancer genetics, epigenetics, signal transduction, and targeted therapy.

== Abstracting and indexing ==
The journal is indexed in PubMed, and Scopus. The journal has a 2021 impact factor of 41.444, according to the Journal Citation Reports.
