= Sebastian Harnisch =

German educator (born 1967)

Sebastian Harnisch (born 3 February 1967 in Germany) is Professor of International Relations and Foreign Policy at the Faculty of Economic and Social Sciences of the University of Heidelberg.

== Education ==
- 2004 Habilitation (Political Science), University of Trier
- 1998 Dr. Phil. (Political Science), University of Trier
- 1993 M.A. (Political Science, History), University of Trier
- 1990–1991 Graduate Studies (Diplomacy), Georgetown University, Washington DC, Exchange Year

== Career ==
Harnisch is currently a Professor of Political Science with a Special Reference to International Politics at the University of Heidelberg and was previously an Assistant and Junior Professor at the University of Trier, Germany. He has held a visiting fellowship at the Seoul National University, South Korea. His research and publications encompass German and American Foreign Policy, European affairs, theories of International Relations, non-proliferation of weapons of mass destruction, and Korean Affairs. Sebastian Harnisch is also the Co-Editor of the Online-Newsletter and E-Monograph series of www.deutsche-aussenpolitik.de.

== Books and edited volumes (selection) ==
- Außenpolitischer Strukturwandel in der Bundesrepublik Deutschland, Baden-Baden: Nomos Verlag (in preparation).
- Internationale Politik und Verfassung. Zur Domestizierung des sicherheits- und europapolitischen Prozesses der Bundesrepublik Deutschland, Baden-Baden: Nomos- Verlag, 2006.
- (ed.) Deutsche Sicherheitspolitik. Eine Bilanz der Regierung Schröder, Baden-Baden: Nomos Verlag, 2004 (with Christos Katsioulis und Marco Overhaus).
- (ed.) Deutschland im Abseits? Rot-grüne Außenpolitik 1998–2003, Baden-Baden: Nomos Verlag, 2003 (with Hanns W. Maull and Constantin Grund).
- (ed.) Germany as a Civilian Power. The Foreign Policy of the Berlin Republic, Manchester: Manchester University Press, 2001 (with Hanns W. Maull).
- Außenpolitisches Lernen. Die US-Außenpolitik auf der koreanischen Halbinsel, Opladen: Leske & Budrich, 2000.
- Kernwaffen in Nordkorea. Regionale Stabilität und Krisenmanagement durch das Genfer Rahmenabkommen (Forschungsinstitut der DGAP), Bonn: Europa Union Verlag, 2000 (with Hanns W. Maull).
- Europa und Amerika. Die US-amerikanische Haltung zur westeuropäischen Integration 1987–1994, Sinzheim: Pro Universitate Verlag 1996.

== Articles ==
- Das Proliferationsnetzwerk um A. Q. Khan, in: Aus Politik und Zeitgeschichte, Vol 48 (2005), S. 1–8.
- (K)ein Bluff wie jeder andere. Nordkoreas nukleares Bekenntnis muss ernst genommen werden, in: Internationale Politik 60 (2005) 3, pp. 104–107.
- German Non-Proliferation Policy and the Iraq Conflict, in: German Politics 13 (2004) 2, pp. 1–34.
- Die ZIB als Forum der deutschen IB? Eine kritische Bestandsaufnahme, in: Zeitschrift für Internationale Beziehungen 11 (2004) 2, pp. 357–364 (with Hanns W. Maull and Siegfried Schieder).
- Transatlantische Kooperation tut Not. Europa, die USA und die Massenvernichtungswaffen, in: Internationale Politik 59 (2004) 1, pp. 19–25.
- US-DPRK Relations under the Bush Administration: From „go slow“ to „no go“, in: Asian Survey 42 (2002) 6, pp. 856–882.
- Embedding Korea’s Unification Multilaterally, in: Pacific Review 15 (2002) 1, pp. 29–62 (with Hanns W. Maull).
- Change and Continuity in Post-Unification German Foreign Policy, in: German Politics 10 (2001) 1, pp. 35–60.
