= International Fiscal Association =

- Abbreviation: IFA
- Established: February 12, 1938; 88 years ago in The Hague, Netherlands
- Type: Professional association
- Purpose: Promote and study International law in relation to public finance and tax law
- Location: Amsterdam, Netherlands
- Region served: Worldwide
- Members: 13,000 members from 118 countries (2023)
- Official language: English
- President: Natalia Quiñones (Colombia)
- Staff: 6 permanent staff (2025)
- Website: www.ifa.nl

The International Fiscal Association (IFA) is a non-governmental and non-sectoral international organisation dealing with international double taxation matters. It was established in 1938 and its headquarters are in the Netherlands. The objects of IFA are the study and advancement of international and comparative law in regard to international double taxation, specifically international and comparative fiscal law and the financial and economic aspects of taxation.

IFA hosts annual congresses and produces scientific publications relating to subjects chosen as the main topics of each congress. The subjects chosen for the congresses are chosen in the interest of developing international tax policy and norms. Each subsequent report presented at each congress consists of a country-by-country report on the international tax topics chosen.

Membership of IFA is around 13,500, representing 118 countries, 71 of which have individual IFA Branches that conduct their own events in addition to feeding to the broader IFA Central based at the headquarters. Membership includes an array of individuals who play a role in fiscal policy work and development such as academics, tax practitioners, and government officials.

== History ==
The association was established in the winter of 1938 in The Hague, Netherlands, at the end of Interwar period. The association was created in response to and increasing internationalisation of the world's economies with international tax issues becoming more numerous.

Along with the increasing internationalization of the world's economies, international tax issues become more numerous and of greater importance. IFA played a role both in the development of certain principles of international taxation and in providing possible solutions to problems arising in their practical implementation since the end of the Second World War.

The Young IFA Network (YIN) was established in 2005 to increase the participation of tax professionals in IFA during the early stages of their careers so that they can develop meaningful and long-lasting relationships with their peers from across the world. While the YIN events are primarily intended to attract members aged 40 and under, all participants are more than welcome to attend.

The Women of IFA Network (WIN) represents and connects the many professional women working in international tax. IFA strives at being representative for a dynamic international tax community and encourages the participation of women in the Association’s structures and proceedings.

== Governance ==
IFA bodies: General Assembly, Executive Board, Supervisory Board, Permanent Scientific Committee, Nominations Committee. The current president of IFA, chairing both the executive board and the general assembly, is Natalia Quiñones, from Colombia.
