= Heidelberg =

City in Baden-Württemberg, Germany

Heidelberg Heidlberg (Palatine German)
- Town
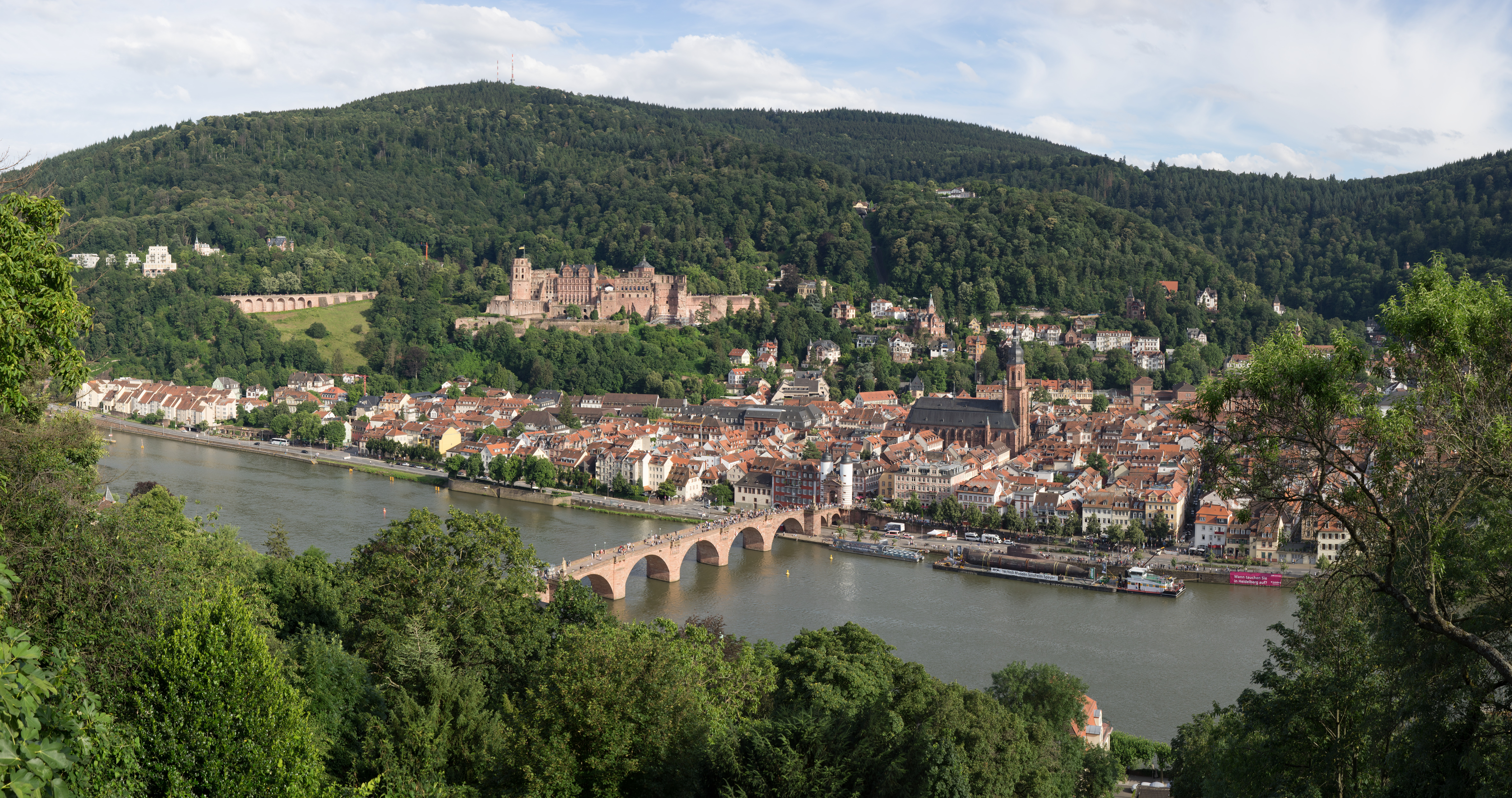
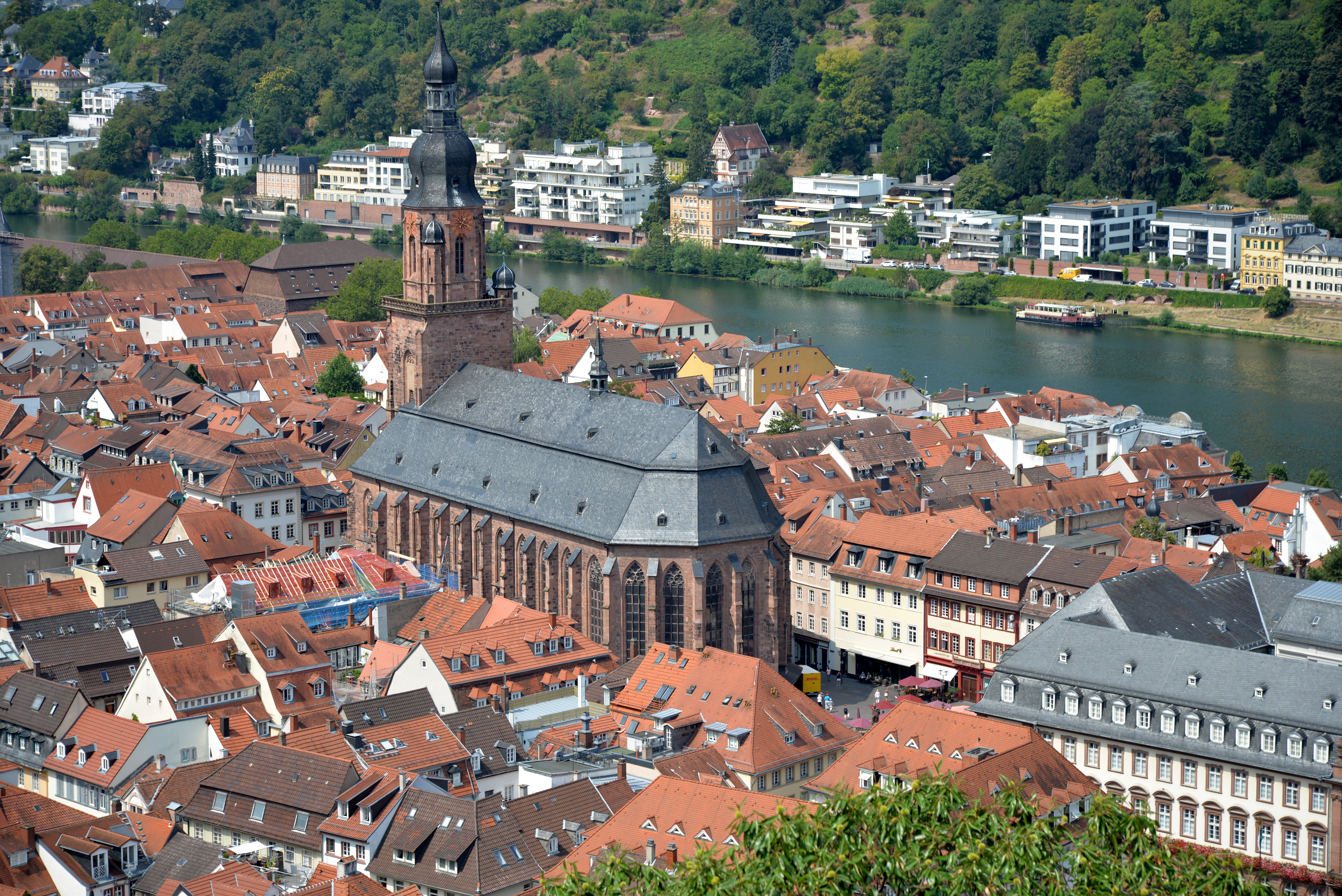
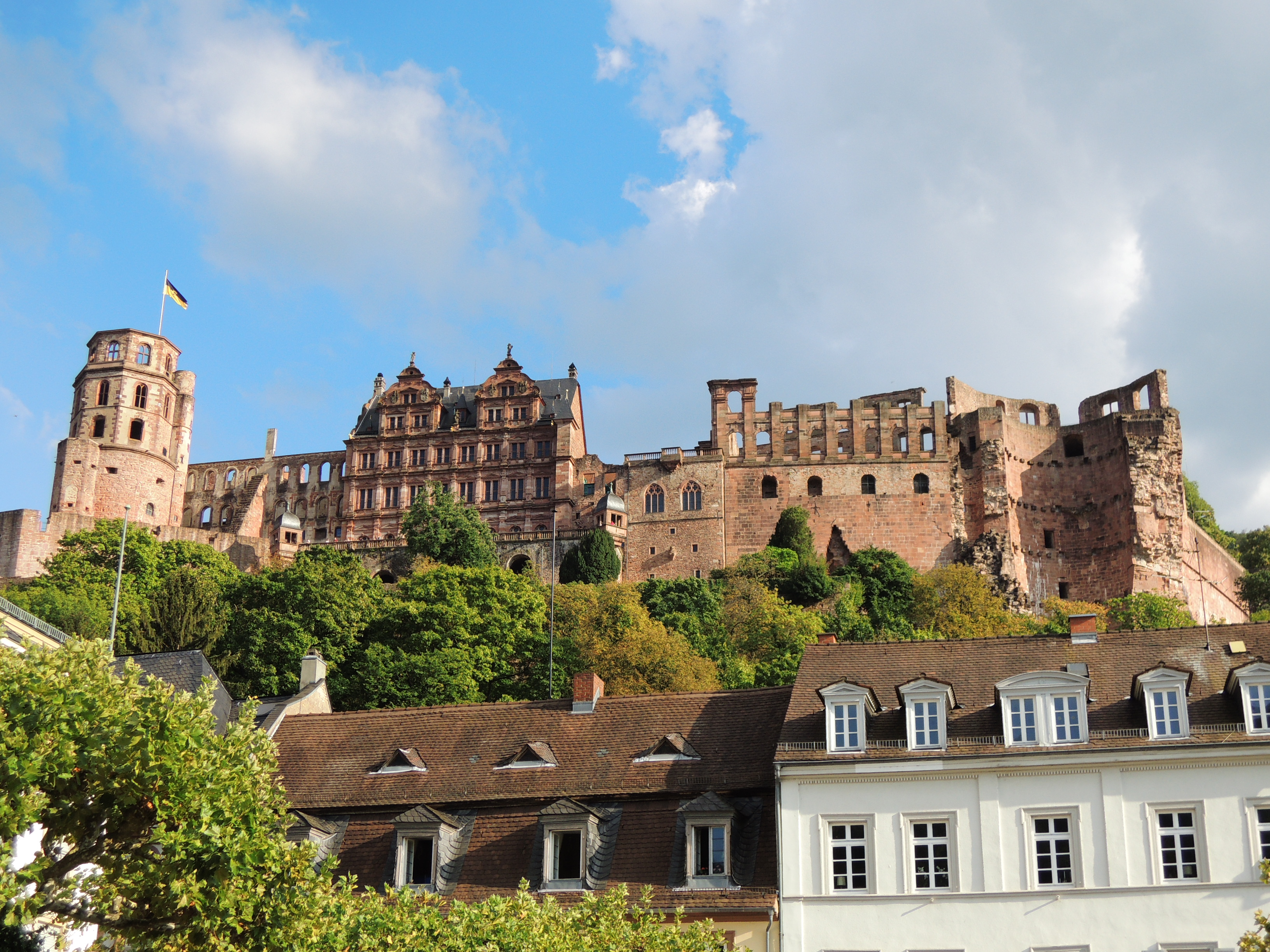
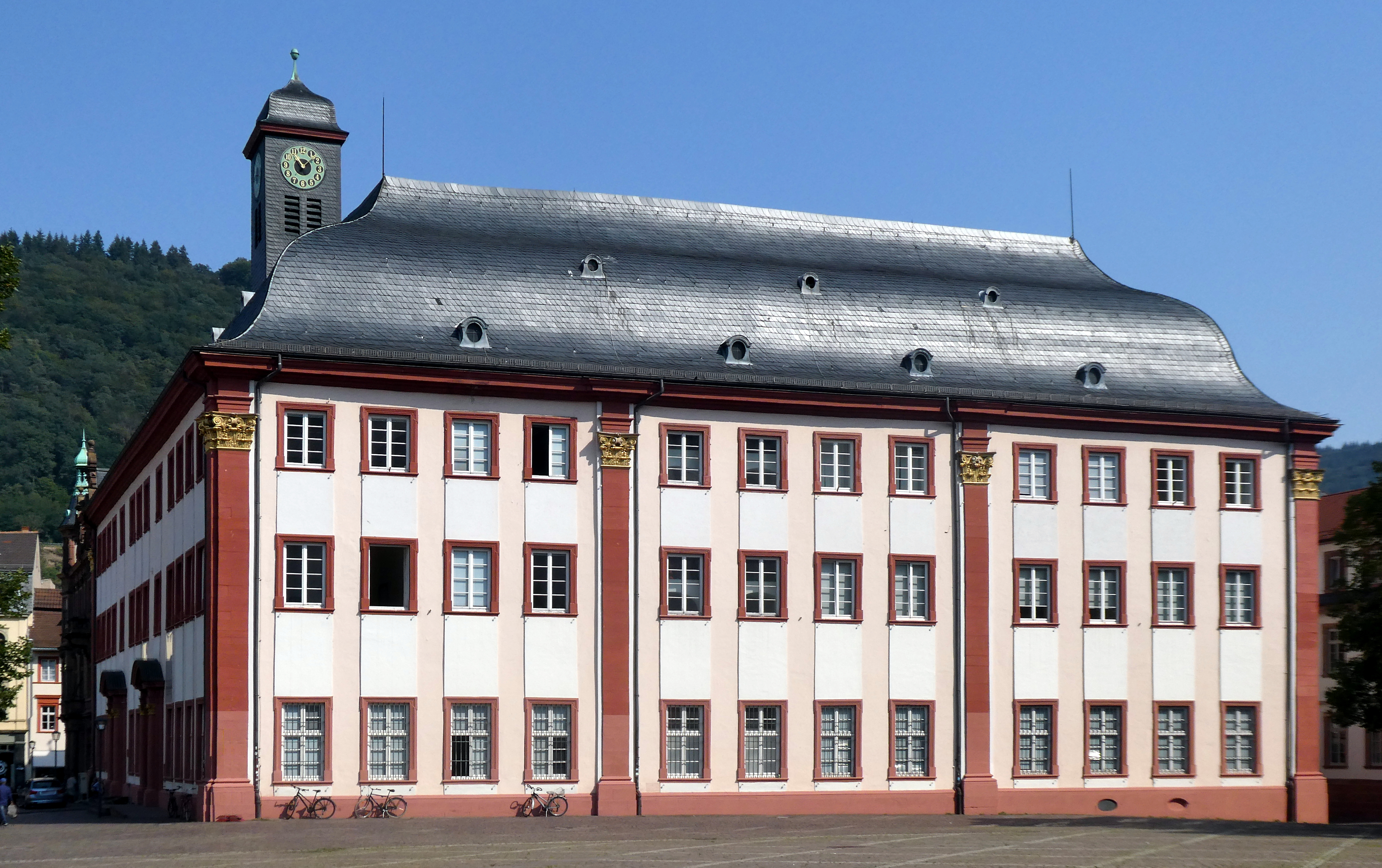
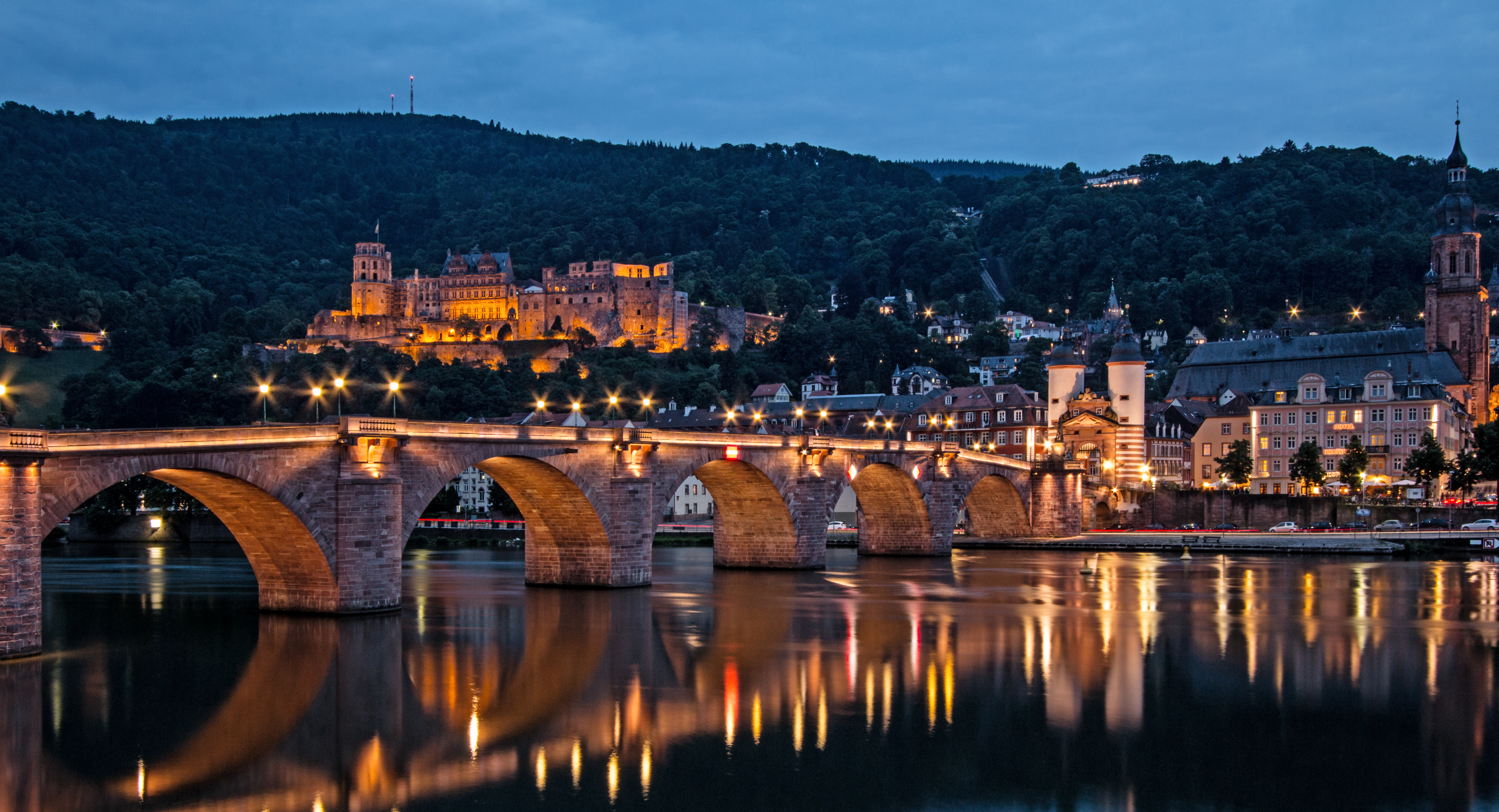
- Heidelberg seen from Philosophers' Walk Church of the Holy Spirit Heidelberg Castle Old University Old Bridge at dawn

- Flag Coat of arms
- Interactive map of Heidelberg
- Location within Germany Location within Baden-Württemberg
- Coordinates: 49°25′N 08°43′E
- Country: Germany
- State: Baden-Württemberg
- Admin. region: Karlsruhe
- District: Urban district

Government
  - Mayor (2022–30): Eckart Würzner (Ind.)

Area
  - Total: 108.83 km^{2} (42.02 sq mi)
- Elevation: 114 m (374 ft)

Population (2025-12-31)
  - Total: 156,092
  - Density: 1,434.3/km^{2} (3,714.8/sq mi)
- Time zone: UTC+01:00 (CET)
  - Summer (DST): UTC+02:00 (CEST)
- Postal codes: 69115–69126
- Dialling codes: 06221
- Vehicle registration: HD
- Website: heidelberg.de

Heidelberg (/ˈhaɪdəlbɜːrɡ/; German: [ˈhaɪdl̩bɛʁk]; Palatine German: Heidlberg) is the fifth-largest city in the German state of Baden-Württemberg, and with a population of about 163,000, of which roughly a quarter consists of students, it is Germany's 51st-largest city. Located about 78 km (48 mi) south of Frankfurt, Heidelberg is part of the densely populated Rhine-Neckar Metropolitan Region which has its centre in Mannheim.

Heidelberg is located on the Neckar River, at the point where it leaves its narrow valley between the Oden Forest and the Little Oden Forest, and enters the wide Upper Rhine Plain. The old town lies in the valley, the end of which is flanked by the Königstuhl in the south and the Heiligenberg in the north. The majority of the population lives in the districts west of the mountains in the Upper Rhine Plain, into which the city has expanded over time.

Heidelberg University, founded in 1386, is Germany's oldest and one of Europe's most reputable universities. Heidelberg is a scientific hub in Germany and home to several internationally renowned research facilities adjacent to its university, including the European Molecular Biology Laboratory and four Max Planck Institutes. The city has also been a hub for the arts, especially literature, throughout the centuries, and it was designated a "City of Literature" by the UNESCO Creative Cities Network.

Heidelberg was a seat of government of the former Electorate of the Palatinate and is a popular tourist destination due to its romantic cityscape, including Heidelberg Castle, the Philosophers' Walk, and the Baroque old town.

== Geography ==
The districts of Heidelberg

Heidelberg is located on the eastern edge of the Upper Rhine Plain (German: Oberrheinebene), at the place where the river Neckar leaves its narrow valley through the Odenwald mountains and begins the last leg of its journey across the plain towards Mannheim, where it merges into the Rhine about 20 kilometers downstream.

A part of Heidelberg, including the historical old town and the famous Heidelberg Castle, is located in the narrow Neckar valley. Other parts (mostly quarters from around the 19th century or newer, or originally independent, later incorporated villages) sprawl out into the Rhine Plain and along the Bergstraße (lit. 'mountain road'), the narrow strip of characteristic landscape along the sharp border between the plain and the Odenwald mountains.

The town is bordered by the Königstuhl (568 m), the Gaisberg (375 m), and the Heiligenberg (445 m) mountains.

Heidelberg is on European walking route E1 (Sweden-Umbria).

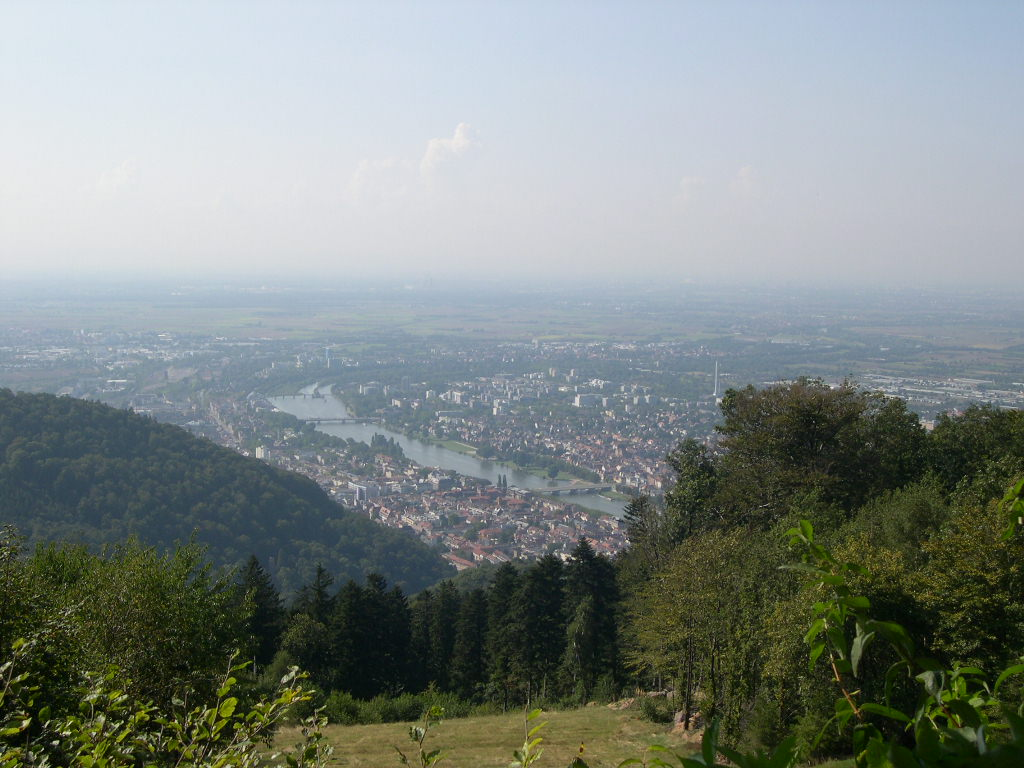
Heidelberg seen from Königstuhl

=== Flora and fauna ===
Heidelberg is among the warmest regions of Germany, and plants atypical of the central-European climate flourish there, including almond and fig trees, and many kinds of palm trees and olive trees. Alongside the Philosophenweg (Philosophers' Walk) on the opposite side of the Old Town, winegrowing was restarted in 2000.

There is a wild population of African rose-ringed parakeets, and a wild population of Siberian swan geese, which can be seen mainly on the islands in the Neckar near the district of Bergheim.

=== Administrative structures ===
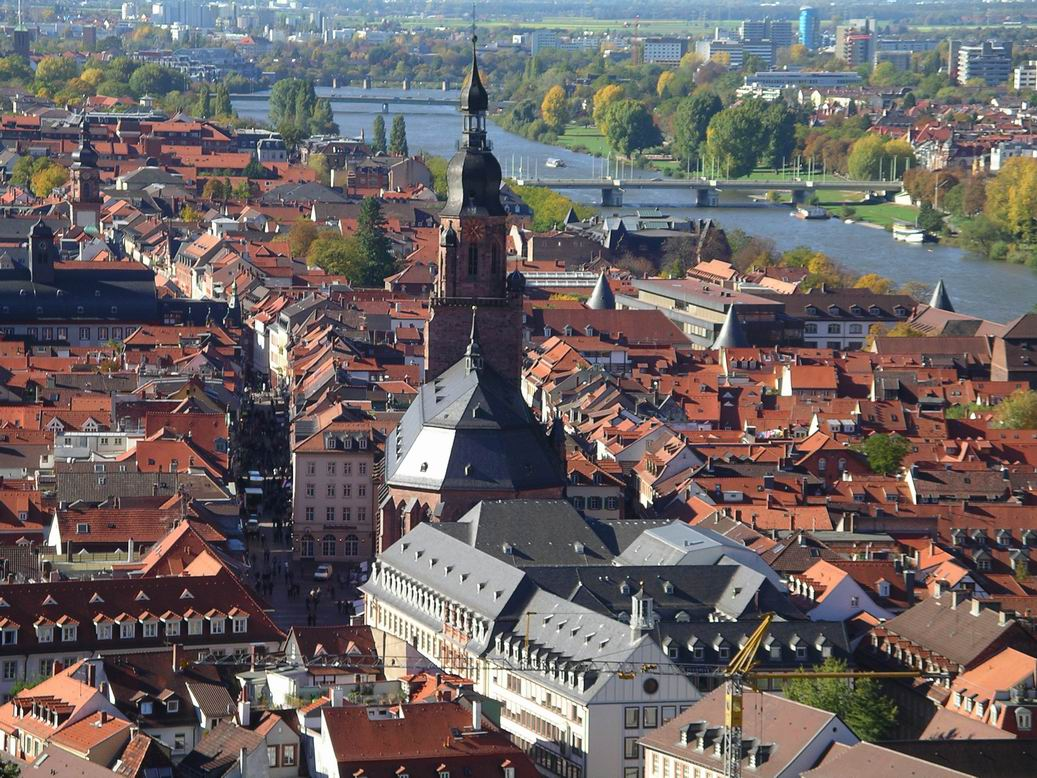
The Old Town

Heidelberg is a unitary authority within the Regierungsbezirk Karlsruhe. The Rhein-Neckar-Kreis rural district surrounds it and has its seat in the town, although the town is not a part of the district. Heidelberg is a part of the Rhine-Neckar Metropolitan Region, often referred to as the Rhein-Neckar Triangle.

This region consists of the southern part of the State of Hessen, the southern part of the State of Rhineland-Palatinate (Vorderpfalz), the administrative districts of Mannheim and Heidelberg, and the municipalities of the Rhein-Neckar-Kreis. The Rhein-Neckar Triangle became a European metropolitan area in 2005.

Heidelberg consists of 15 districts distributed in six sectors of the town. In the central area are Altstadt (the Old Town), Bergheim and Weststadt; in the north, Neuenheim and Handschuhsheim; in the east, Ziegelhausen and Schlierbach; in the south, Südstadt, Rohrbach, Emmertsgrund, and Boxberg; in the southwest, Kirchheim; in the west, Pfaffengrund, Wieblingen, and a new district, named Bahnstadt, is built on land in Weststadt and Wieblingen. The new district will have approximately 5,000–6,000 residents and employment for 7,000. Further, new residential space for 10,000–15,000 residents was made available in Patrick Henry Village following the departure of the US Armed Forces.

=== Neighbouring communes ===
The following towns and communes border the city of Heidelberg, beginning in the west and in a clockwise direction: Edingen-Neckarhausen, Dossenheim, Schriesheim, Wilhelmsfeld, Schönau, Neckargemünd, Bammental, Gaiberg, Leimen, Sandhausen, Oftersheim, Plankstadt, Eppelheim (all part of the Rhein-Neckar-Kreis), and Mannheim.

=== Climate ===
Heidelberg has an oceanic climate (Köppen climate classification Cfb), defined by the protected valley between the Pfälzerwald and the Odenwald. The almost year round warm temperatures are usually determined by Atlantic air masses in the winter and increased influence from the western Mediterranean in summer. In contrast to the nearby Upper Rhine Plain, Heidelberg's position in the valley leads to more frequent easterly winds than average. The hillsides of the Odenwald favor clouding and precipitation.

Spring starts earlier than the average in Germany (usually mid February in the recent years). While the weather in spring is typically warm, it is also known to change far more often than in the summer.

Summer starts typically in June and stays until September. In this time the weather is typically stable, with single thunderstorms marking the only precipitation. Day temperatures of around 30 °C are typical, but can reach up to 40 °C during heat waves.

Autumn starts warm in September and cools down to typical winter temperatures for the region by the end of November. Precipitation levels begin to increase and, due to the decreasing sunlight, the region is affected by fog more frequently from the second part of October onwards.

Winters are mostly mild, though light nighttime frosts do occur in the coldest months. Snow is a rare event, and precipitation normally falls as rain. Winters are the wettest time of the year, with frequent western winds blowing from the Atlantic. Storms ("Orkane") can create severe damage, and the Neckar is often affected by floods.

According to the German Meteorological Service, Heidelberg was the warmest place in Germany in 2009.

Climate data for Heidelberg (1991–2010 normals, extremes 1935–2012)
Month	Jan	Feb	Mar	Apr	May	Jun	Jul	Aug	Sep	Oct	Nov	Dec	Year
Record high °C (°F)	16.2 (61.2)	20.0 (68.0)	25.4 (77.7)	31.4 (88.5)	34.0 (93.2)	38.1 (100.6)	39.5 (103.1)	38.8 (101.8)	34.7 (94.5)	28.5 (83.3)	21.4 (70.5)	18.5 (65.3)	39.5 (103.1)
Mean daily maximum °C (°F)	5.1 (41.2)	7.0 (44.6)	11.5 (52.7)	16.4 (61.5)	20.7 (69.3)	24.0 (75.2)	26.0 (78.8)	25.7 (78.3)	20.8 (69.4)	15.3 (59.5)	9.3 (48.7)	5.4 (41.7)	15.6 (60.1)
Daily mean °C (°F)	2.6 (36.7)	3.9 (39.0)	7.5 (45.5)	11.4 (52.5)	15.7 (60.3)	18.7 (65.7)	20.7 (69.3)	20.2 (68.4)	16.0 (60.8)	11.4 (52.5)	6.6 (43.9)	3.2 (37.8)	11.5 (52.7)
Mean daily minimum °C (°F)	0.0 (32.0)	0.9 (33.6)	3.7 (38.7)	6.5 (43.7)	10.6 (51.1)	13.5 (56.3)	15.7 (60.3)	15.2 (59.4)	11.5 (52.7)	7.9 (46.2)	4.0 (39.2)	0.8 (33.4)	7.5 (45.5)
Record low °C (°F)	−26.0 (−14.8)	−21.5 (−6.7)	−12.0 (10.4)	−5.0 (23.0)	−1.1 (30.0)	3.5 (38.3)	6.0 (42.8)	5.7 (42.3)	0.7 (33.3)	−3.2 (26.2)	−7.6 (18.3)	−18.8 (−1.8)	−26.0 (−14.8)
Average precipitation mm (inches)	43.6 (1.72)	48.5 (1.91)	56.7 (2.23)	46.9 (1.85)	71.5 (2.81)	65.7 (2.59)	80.1 (3.15)	66.0 (2.60)	57.0 (2.24)	62.1 (2.44)	64.9 (2.56)	60.7 (2.39)	723.7 (28.49)
Average precipitation days (≥ 0.1 mm)	14.4	14.2	15.0	12.8	13.9	13.4	14.9	13.5	13.0	14.4	16.7	17.0	173.2
Average relative humidity (%)	78.5	75.2	69.3	63.5	65.2	64.8	64.5	65.7	71.6	77.0	81.1	80.9	71.4
Mean monthly sunshine hours	46.0	78.2	118.0	173.3	206.0	214.6	233.1	218.5	157.6	101.4	50.8	35.5	1,633
Source 1: SKlima
Source 2: WetterzentraleDeutscher Wetterdienst (sun 1981–2010)

== History ==
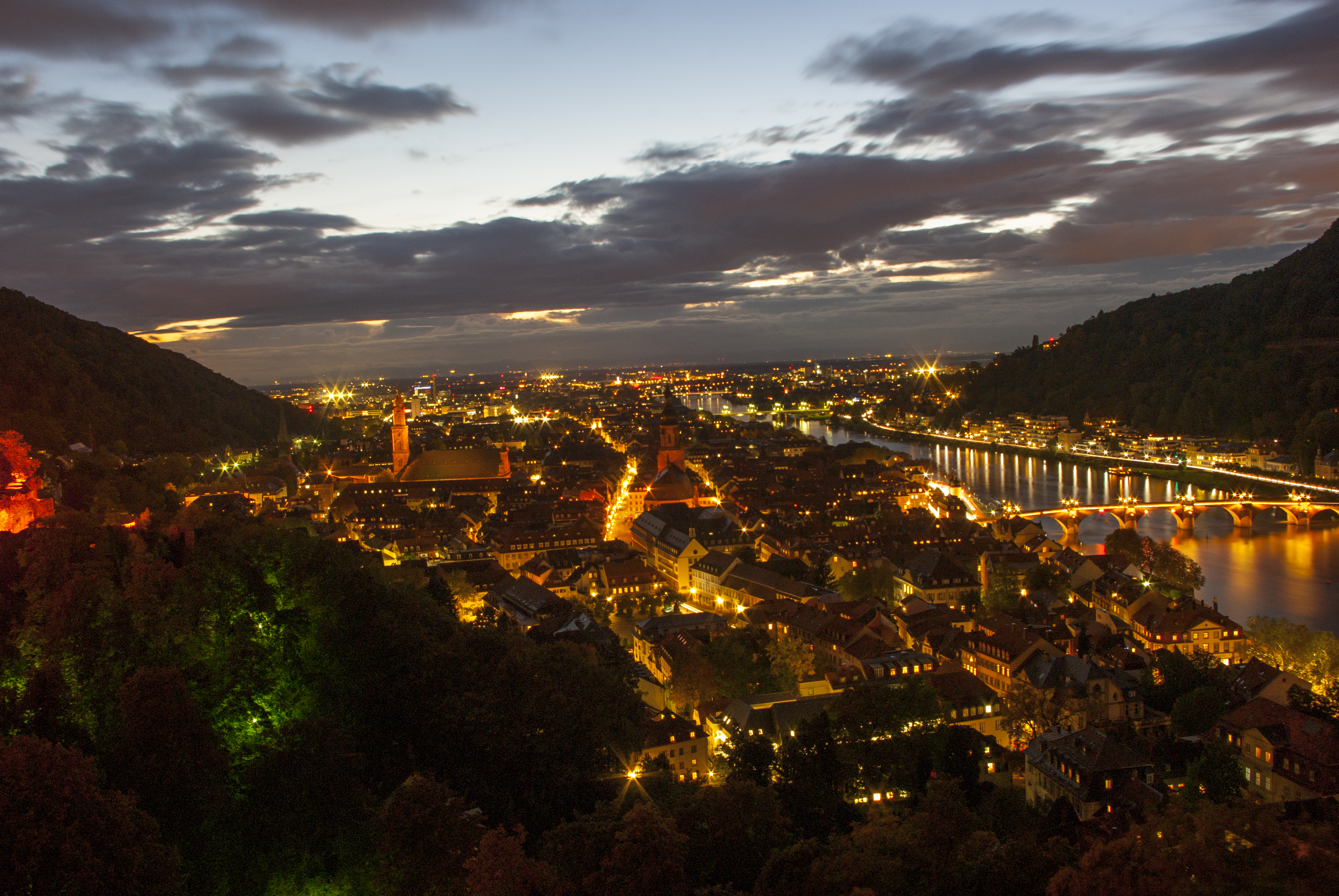
Heidelberg on the Neckar at night

=== Early history ===
Between 600,000 and 200,000 years ago, "Heidelberg Man" died at nearby Mauer. His jaw bone was discovered in 1907. Scientific dating determined his remains as the earliest evidence of human life in Europe. In the 5th century BC, a Celtic fortress of refuge and place of worship were built on the Heiligenberg, or "Holy Mountain". Both places can still be identified. In 40 AD, a fort was built and occupied by the 24th Roman cohort and the 2nd Cyrenaican cohort (CCG XXIIII and CCH II CYR). The late Roman Emperor Valentinian I, in 369 AD, built new and maintained older castra (permanent camps) and a signal tower on the bank of the Neckar. They built a wooden bridge based on stone pillars across it. The camp protected the first civilian settlements and was eventually captured by Germanic tribes. The local administrative centre in Roman times was the nearby city of Lopodunum, today known as Ladenburg.

=== Middle Ages ===
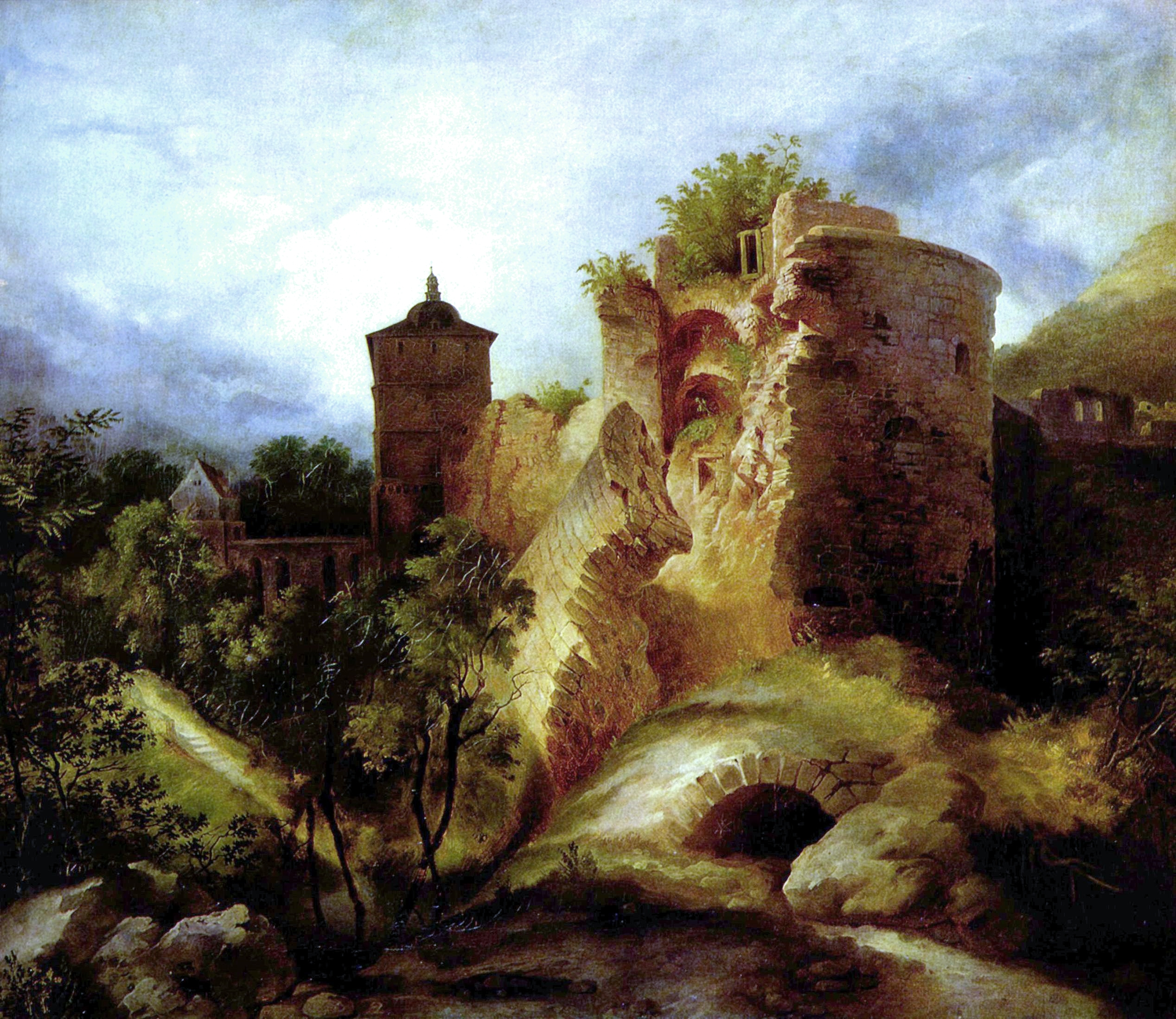
Heidelberg Castle, here shown in a painting by Carl Blechen, was destroyed by the French during the war of the succession of the Electorate of the Palatinate.

Modern Heidelberg can trace its beginnings to the fifth century. The village Bergheim (Mountain Home) is first mentioned for that period in documents dated to 769 AD. Bergheim now lies in the middle of modern Heidelberg. The people gradually converted to Christianity. In 870 AD, the monastery of St. Michael was founded on the Heiligenberg inside the double rampart of the Celtic fortress. Around 1130, the Neuburg Monastery was founded in the Neckar valley. At the same time, the bishopric of Worms extended its influence into the valley, founding Schönau Abbey in 1142. Modern Heidelberg can trace its roots to this 12th-century monastery. The first reference to Heidelberg can be found in a document in Schönau Abbey dated to 1196. This is considered to be the town's founding date. In 1156, Heidelberg castle and its neighboring settlement were taken over by the house of Hohenstaufen. Conrad of Hohenstaufen became Count Palatine of the Rhine (German: Pfalzgraf bei Rhein). In 1195, the Electorate of the Palatinate passed to the House of Welf through marriage. In 1214, Ludwig I, Duke of Bavaria acquired the Palatinate, as a consequence of which the castle came under his control. By 1303, another castle had been constructed for defense. In 1356, the Counts Palatine were granted far-reaching rights in the Golden Bull, in addition to becoming Electors. In 1386, Heidelberg University was founded by Rupert I, Elector Palatine.

=== Modern history ===
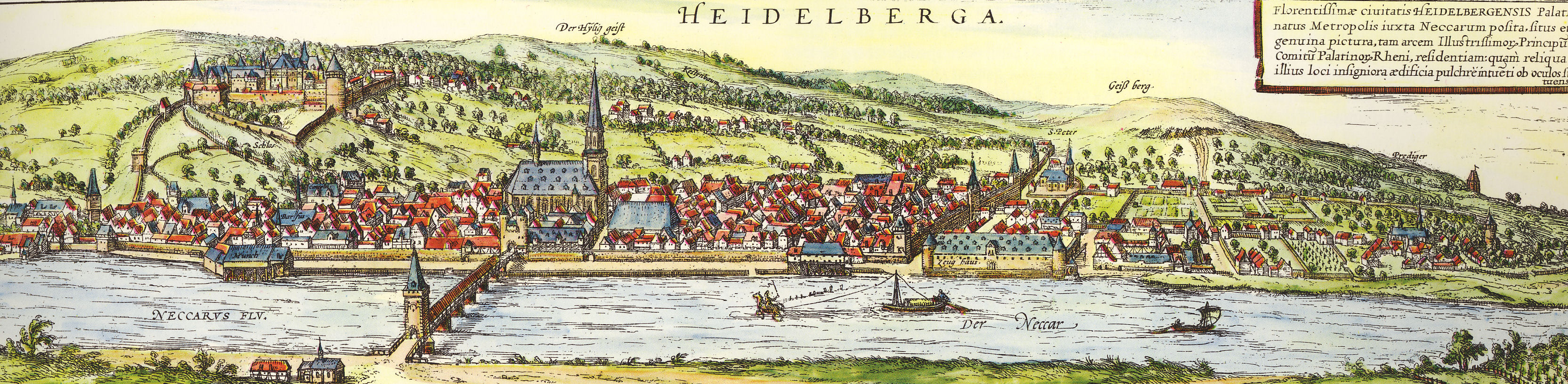
Engraving of Heidelberg by Georg Braun and Frans Hogenberg, published between 1572 and 1618

Heidelberg University played a leading part in Medieval Scholasticism, Renaissance humanism, the German Reformation, and in the subsequent conflict between Lutheranism and Calvinism during the 15th and 16th centuries. In April 1518, a few months after proclaiming his Ninety-five Theses, Martin Luther was received in Heidelberg, to defend them.

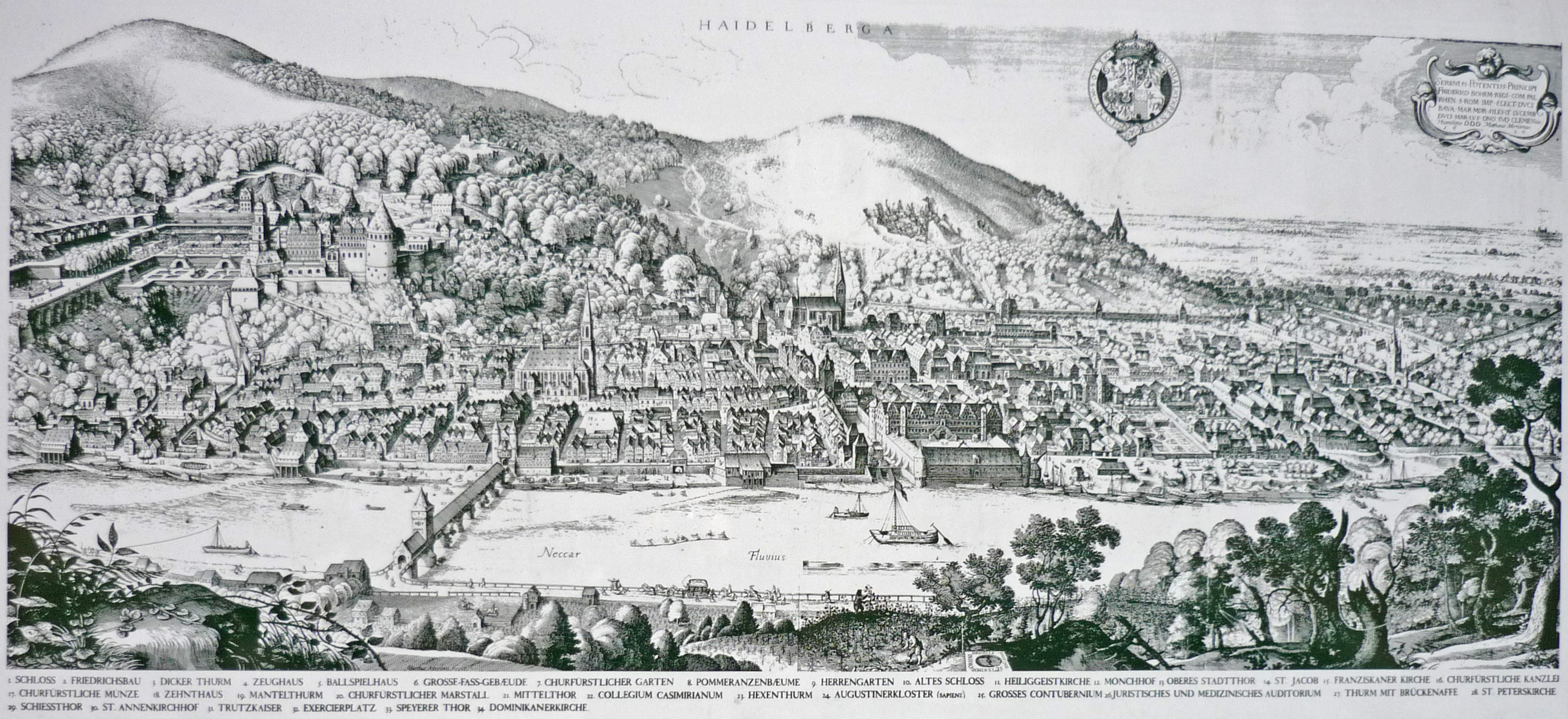
Engraving by Matthäus Merian showing Heidelberg in 1620

Heidelberg's library, founded in 1421, is the oldest existing public library in Germany.

In 1537, the castle located higher up the mountain was destroyed by a gunpowder explosion. The duke's palace was built at the site of the lower castle.

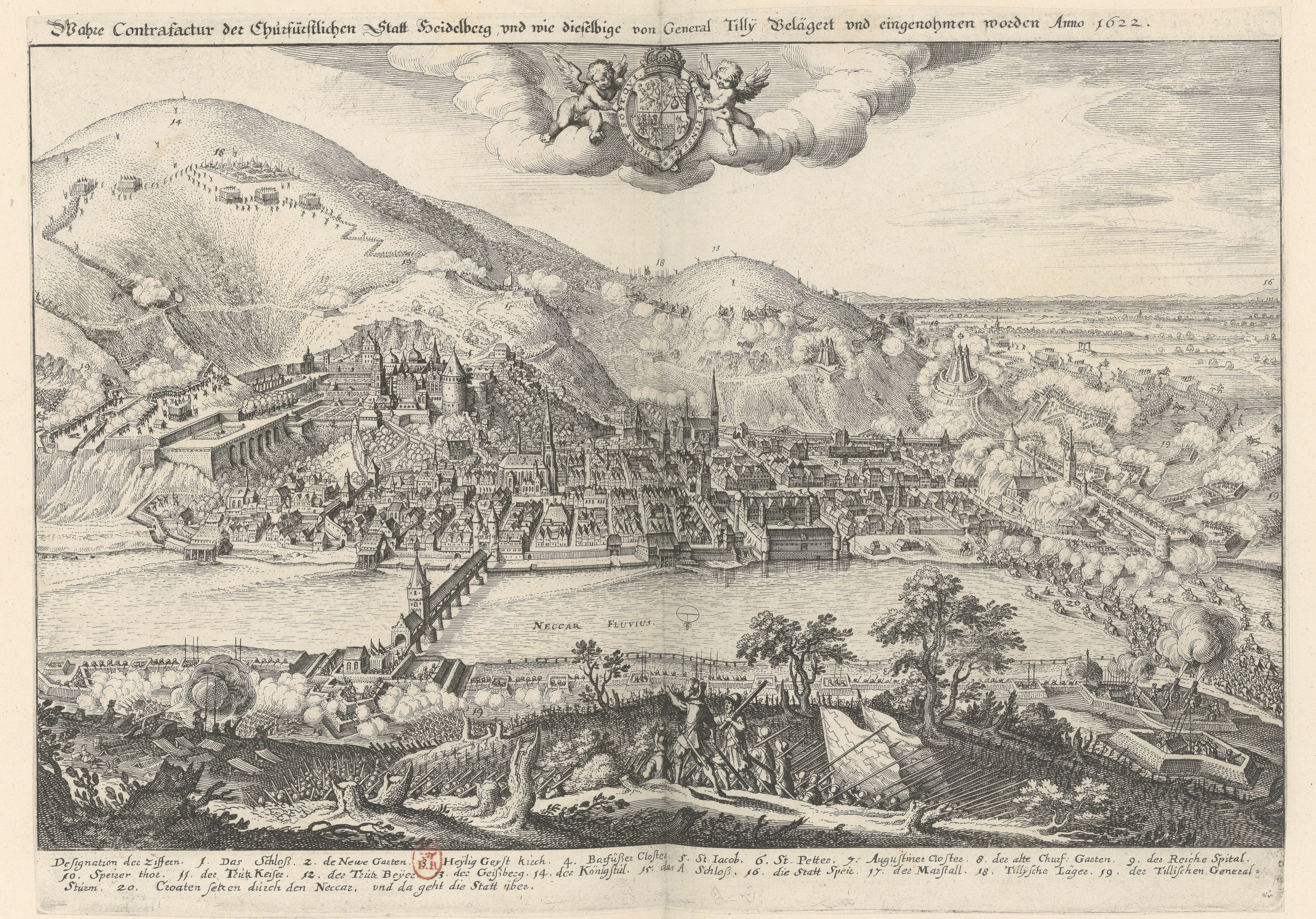
The siege of Heidelberg in 1622, in which Catholic League and Spanish forces under General Tilly captured the city from its Protestant defenders.

Elector Frederick III, sovereign of the Electoral Palatinate from 1559 to 1576, commissioned the composition of a new Catechism for his territory. While the catechism's introduction credits the "entire theological faculty here" (at the University of Heidelberg) and "all the superintendents and prominent servants of the church" for the composition of the Catechism, Zacharius Ursinus is commonly regarded as the catechism's principal author. Caspar Olevianus (1536–1587) was formerly asserted as a co-author of the document, though this theory has been largely discarded by modern scholarship. Johann Sylvan, Adam Neuser, Johannes Willing, Thomas Erastus, Michael Diller, Johannes Brunner, Tilemann Mumius, Petrus Macheropoeus, Johannes Eisenmenger, Immanuel Tremellius, and Pierre Boquin are all likely to have contributed to the Catechism in some way. Frederick himself wrote the preface to the Catechism and closely oversaw its composition and publication. Frederick, who was officially Lutheran but had strong Reformed leanings, wanted to even out the religious situation of his highly Lutheran territory within the primarily Catholic Holy Roman Empire. The Council of Trent had just concluded with its conclusions and decrees against the Protestant faiths, and the Peace of Augsburg had only granted toleration for Lutheranism within the empire where the ruler was Lutheran. One of the aims of the catechism was to counteract the teachings of the Roman Catholic Church as well as Anabaptists and "strict" Gnesio-Lutherans like Tilemann Heshusius and Matthias Flacius, who were resisting Frederick's Reformed influences, particularly on the matter of Eucharist (the Lord's Supper). The Catechism-based each of its statements on biblical proof-texts, and Frederick himself would defend it as biblical, not reformed, at the 1566 Diet of Augsburg when he was called to answer to charges of violating the Peace of Augsburg. This was the Heidelberg Catechism, officially called the ″Catechism, or Christian Instruction, according to the Usages of the Churches and Schools of the Electoral Palatinate.″

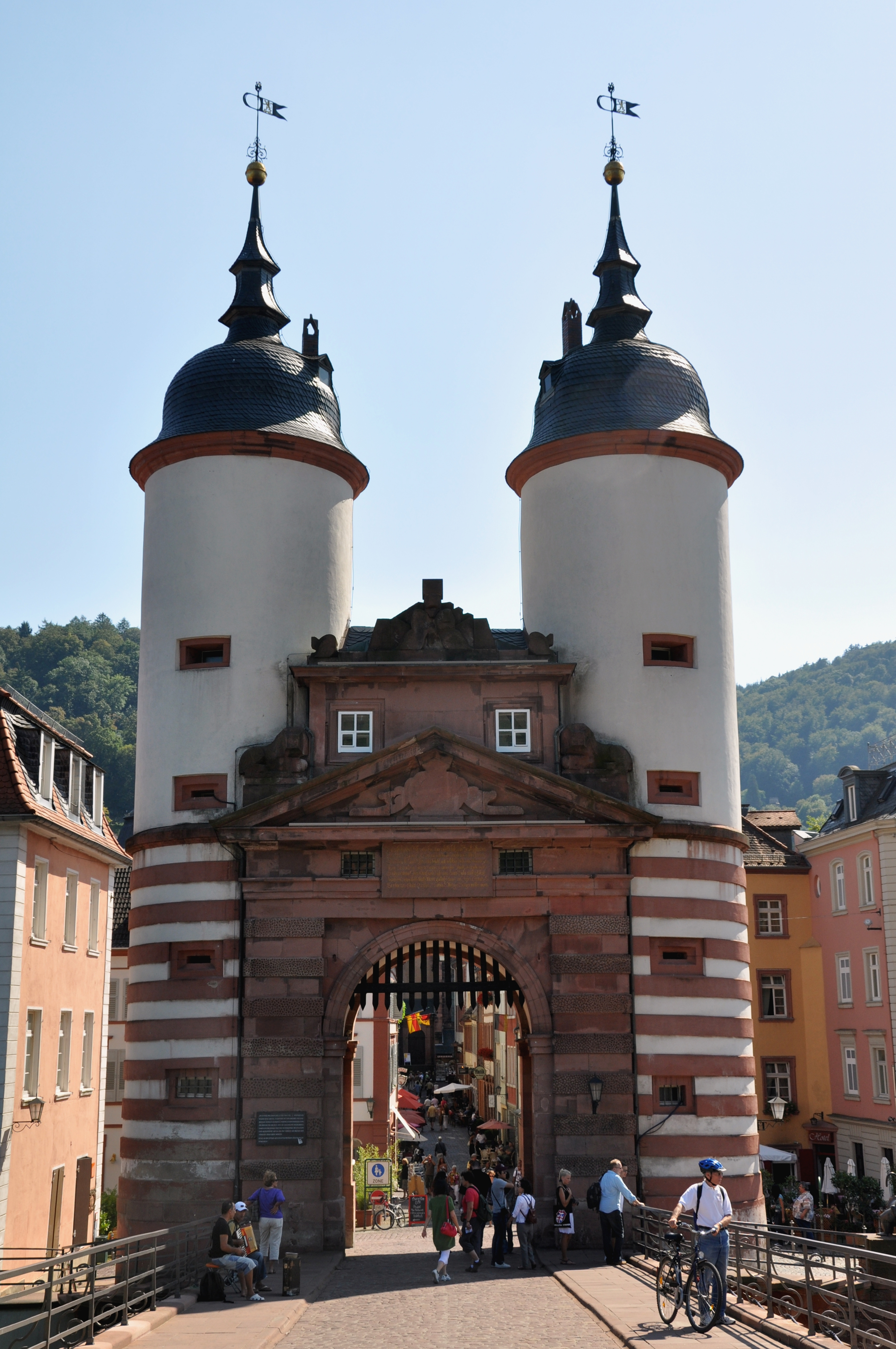
Old Bridge Gate

In November 1619, the Royal Crown of Bohemia was offered to the Elector, Frederick V. (He was married to Princess Elizabeth, eldest daughter of James VI and I of Scotland and England, respectively.) Frederick became known as the "Winter King", as he reigned for only one winter before the Imperial House of Habsburg regained Bohemia by force. His overthrow in 1621 marked the beginning of the Thirty Years' War. In 1622, after a siege of two months, the armies of the Catholic League, commanded by Johann Tserclaes, Count of Tilly, captured the town. Tilly gave the famous Bibliotheca Palatina from the Church of the Holy Spirit to the Pope as a present. The Catholic and Bavarian House of Wittelsbach gained control over the Palatinate and the title of Prince-Elector.

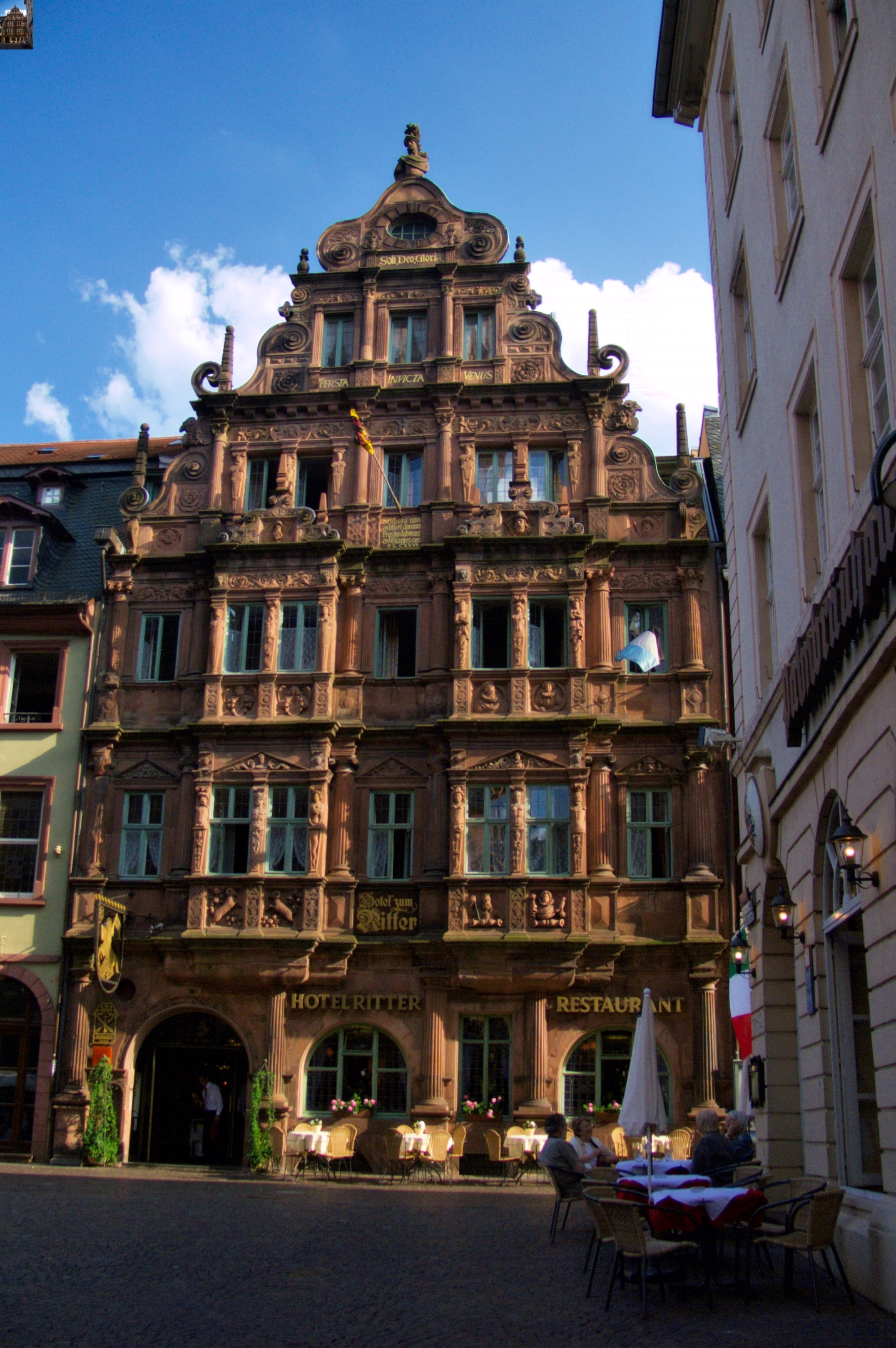
Hotel zum Ritter St. Georg

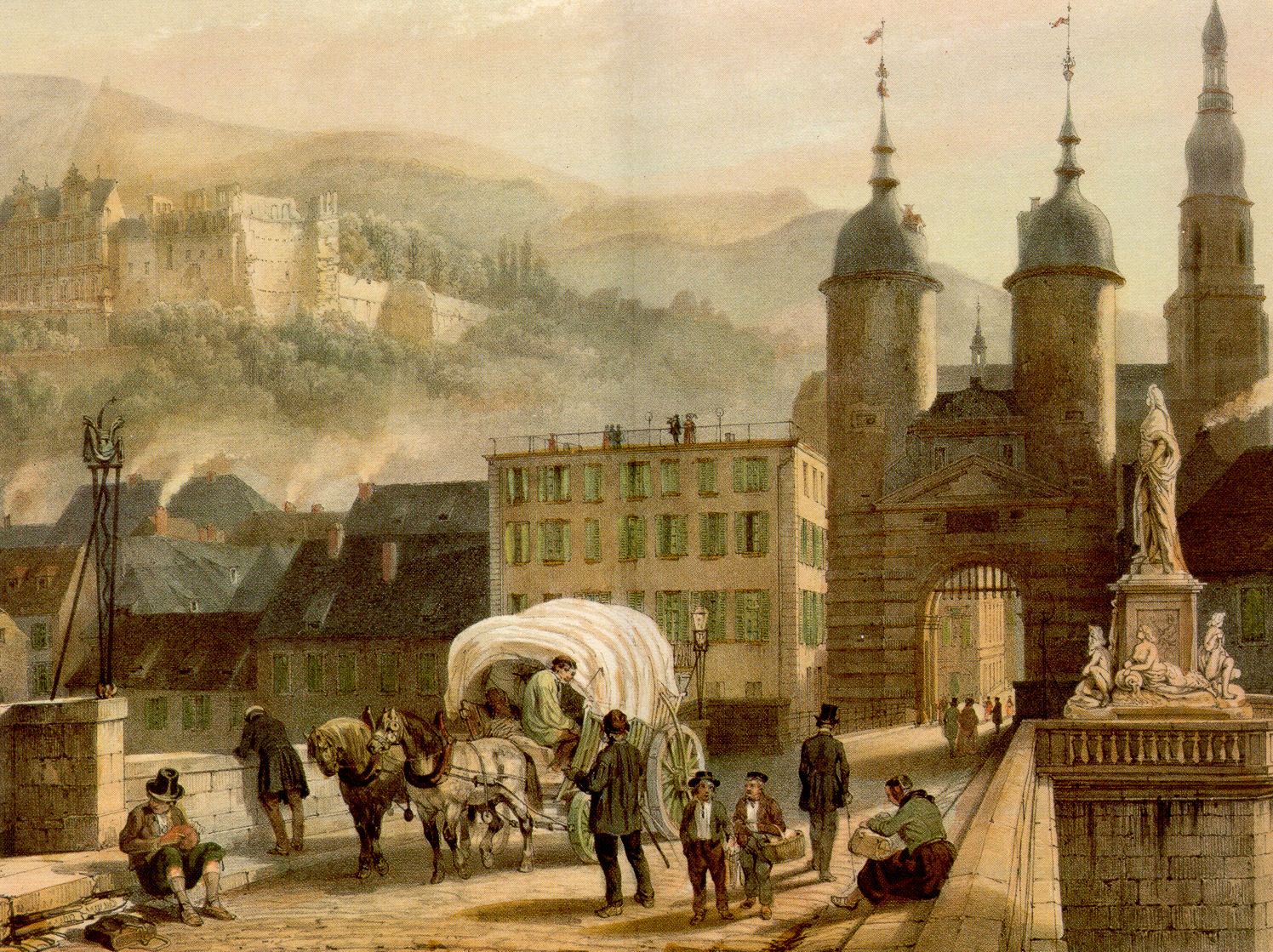
Old Bridge, Konrad Linck, 1788

In late 1634, after the Swedish army had conquered Heidelberg, imperial forces attempted to recapture the city. They quickly took the city, but were unable to take the castle. As they prepared to blow up its fortifications with gunpowder the French army arrived, 30,000 men strong, led by Urbain de Maillé-Brézé, who had fought in many battles and participated in the Siege of La Rochelle (1627–1628), and Jacques-Nompar de Caumont, duc de La Force. They broke the siege and drove off the Imperial forces.

In 1648, at the end of the war, Frederick V's son Charles I Louis, Elector Palatine, was able to recover his titles and lands. To strengthen his dynasty, Charles I Louis arranged the marriage of his daughter Liselotte to Philip I, Duke of Orléans, brother of Louis XIV, King of France. In 1685, after the death of Charles Louis' son, Elector Charles II, King Louis XIV laid claim to his sister-in-law's inheritance. The Germans rejected the claim, in part because of religious differences between local Protestants and the French Catholics, as the Protestant Reformation had divided the peoples of Europe. The War of the Grand Alliance ensued. In 1689, French troops took the town and castle, bringing nearly total destruction to the area in 1693. As a result of the destruction due to repeated French invasions related to the War of the Palatinate Succession coupled with severe winters, thousands of German Calvinist Palatines emigrated in the early 18th century. They fled to other European cities and especially to London (where the refugees were called "the poor Palatines"). In sympathy for the Protestants, in 1709–1710, Queen Anne's government arranged transport for nearly 6,000 Palatines to New York. Others were transported to Pennsylvania, and to South Carolina. They worked their passage and later settled in the English colonies there.

In 1720, after assigning a major church for exclusively Catholic use, religious conflicts with the mostly Protestant inhabitants of Heidelberg caused the Roman Catholic Prince-Elector Charles III Philip to transfer his court to nearby Mannheim. The court remained there until the Elector Charles Theodore became Elector of Bavaria in 1777 and established his court in Munich. In 1742, Elector Charles Theodore began rebuilding the Palace. In 1764, a lightning bolt destroyed other palace buildings during reconstruction, causing the work to be discontinued.

=== 1803 to 1933 ===
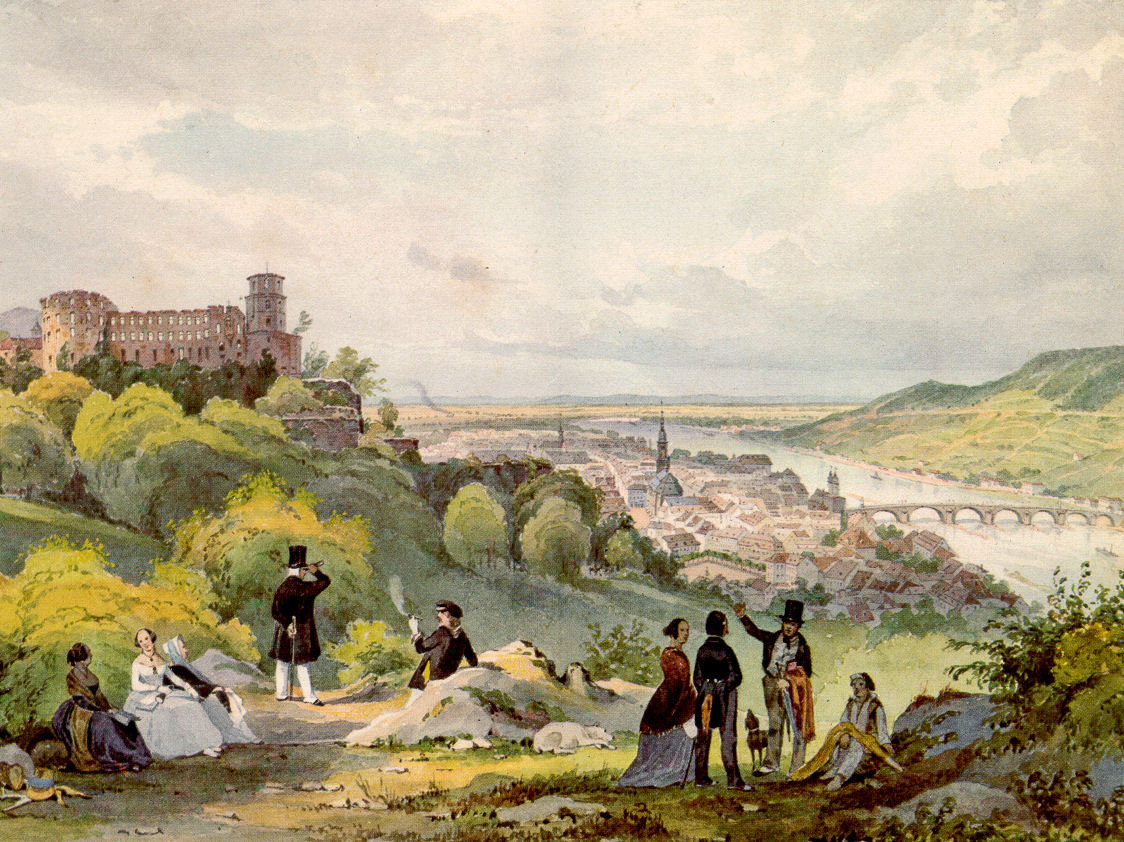
View of Heidelberg Castle and the Old Bridge, created by Louis Hoffmeister circa 1820

Heidelberg fell to the Grand Duchy of Baden in 1803. Charles Frederick, Grand Duke of Baden, re-founded the university, named "Ruperto-Carola" after its two founders. Notable scholars soon earned it a reputation as a "royal residence of the intellect". In the 18th century, the town was rebuilt in the Baroque style on the old medieval layout.

In 1810 the French Revolution refugee Count Charles Graimberg began to preserve the palace ruins and establish a historical collection. In 1815, the emperor of Austria, the emperor of Russia and the king of Prussia formed the "Holy Alliance" in Heidelberg. In 1848, the German National Assembly was held there. In 1849, during the Palatinate-Baden rebellion of the 1848 Revolutions, Heidelberg was the headquarters of a revolutionary army. It was defeated by a Prussian army near Waghaeusel. The city was occupied by Prussian troops until 1850. Between 1920 and 1933, Heidelberg University became a center of notable physicians Czerny, Erb, and Krehl; and humanists Rohde, Weber, and Gundolf.

=== Nazism and the World War II period ===
During the Nazi period (1933–1945), Heidelberg was a stronghold of the NSDAP/Nazi party (the National Socialist German Workers' Party), the strongest party in the elections before 1933 (the NSDAP obtained 30% at the communal elections of 1930). The NSDAP received 45.9% of the votes in the German federal election of March 1933 (the national average was 43.9%). In 1934 and 1935 the Reichsarbeitsdienst (State Labor Service) and Heidelberg University students built the huge Thingstätte amphitheatre on the Heiligenberg north of the town, for Nazi Party and SS events. A few months later, the inauguration of the huge Ehrenfriedhof memorial cemetery completed the second and last NSDAP project in Heidelberg. This cemetery is on the southern side of the old part of town, a little south of the Königstuhl hilltop, and faces west towards France. During World War II and after, Wehrmacht soldiers were buried there.

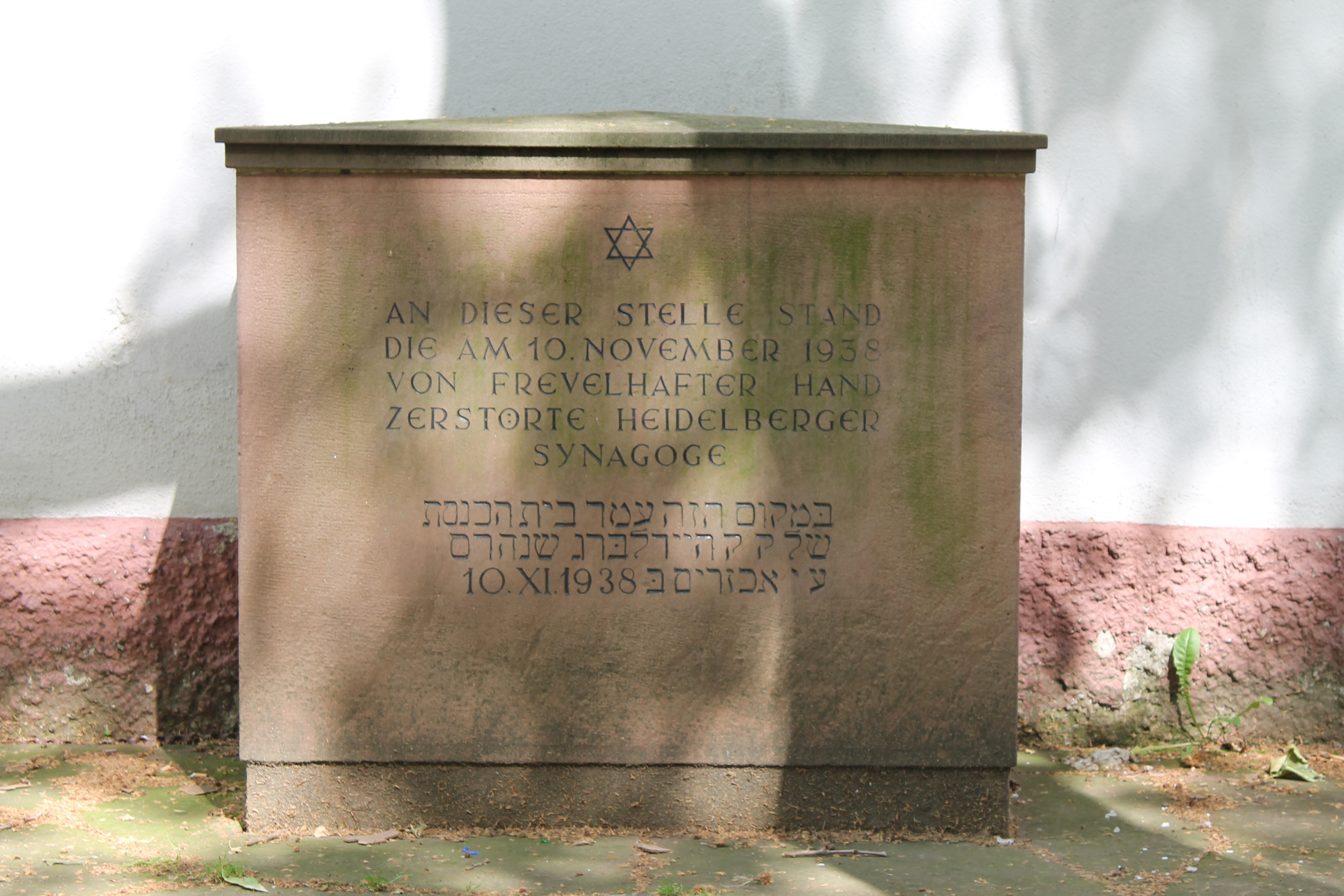
Memorial stone marking the site of the synagogue in the Lauerstrasse

During the Kristallnacht on 9 November 1938, Nazis burned down synagogues at two locations in the city. The next day, they started the systematic deportation of Jews, sending 150 to Dachau concentration camp. On 22 October 1940, during the "Wagner Buerckel event", the Nazis deported 6000 local Jews, including 281 from Heidelberg, to Camp Gurs concentration camp in France. Within a few months, as many as 1000 of them (201 from Heidelberg) died of hunger and disease. Among the deportees from Heidelberg, the poet Alfred Mombert (1872–1942) left the concentration camp in April 1941 thanks to the Swiss poet Hans Reinhart but died shortly thereafter due to illness he contracted while held prisoner. From 1942, the deportees who had survived internment in Gurs were deported to Eastern Europe, where most of them were murdered.

The U.S. 44th Infantry Division took part in combat in Western Europe throughout 1944 and early 1945, and the division's artillery commander, Brigadier General William A. Beiderlinden, became the subject of international headlines in March 1945, when he helped save Heidelberg from bombing by persuading Nazi troops to withdraw. When his command was ordered to shell the city, Beiderlinden took the initiative to contact the burgomaster and attempt to persuade Nazi soldiers to abandon their positions. Though burgomasters were forbidden from conducting such talks, Heidelberg's burgomaster ignored warnings from the local Nazi gauleiter and discussed the matter with Beiderlinden. The negotiations focused on the importance of sparing Heidelberg University and other historic and culturally significant sites. Beiderlinden and the burgomaster agreed to terms, and the Nazis spared the city by evacuating.

On 29 March 1945, German troops left the city after destroying three arches of the old bridge, Heidelberg's treasured river crossing. They also destroyed the more modern bridge downstream. The U.S. Army (63rd Infantry, 7th Army) entered the town on 30 March 1945. The civilian population surrendered without resistance.

Heidelberg, unlike most German cities and towns, was spared from Allied bombing raids during the war. A popular belief is that Heidelberg escaped bombing because the U.S. Army wanted to use the city as a garrison after the war, but, as Heidelberg was neither an industrial center nor a transport hub, it did not present a tactical or strategic target. Other notable university towns, such as Tübingen and Göttingen, were spared bombing as well. Allied air raids focused extensively on the nearby industrial cities of Mannheim and Ludwigshafen.

The U.S. Army may have chosen Heidelberg as a garrison base because of its excellent infrastructure, including the Heidelberg–Mannheim Autobahn (motorway), which connected to the Mannheim–Darmstadt–Frankfurt Autobahn, and the U.S. Army installations in Mannheim and Frankfurt. The intact rail infrastructure was more important in the late 1940s and early 1950s when most heavy loads were still carried by train, not by truck. Heidelberg had the untouched Wehrmacht barracks, the "Grossdeutschland Kaserne" which the US Army occupied soon after, renaming it the Campbell Barracks.

=== History after 1945 ===
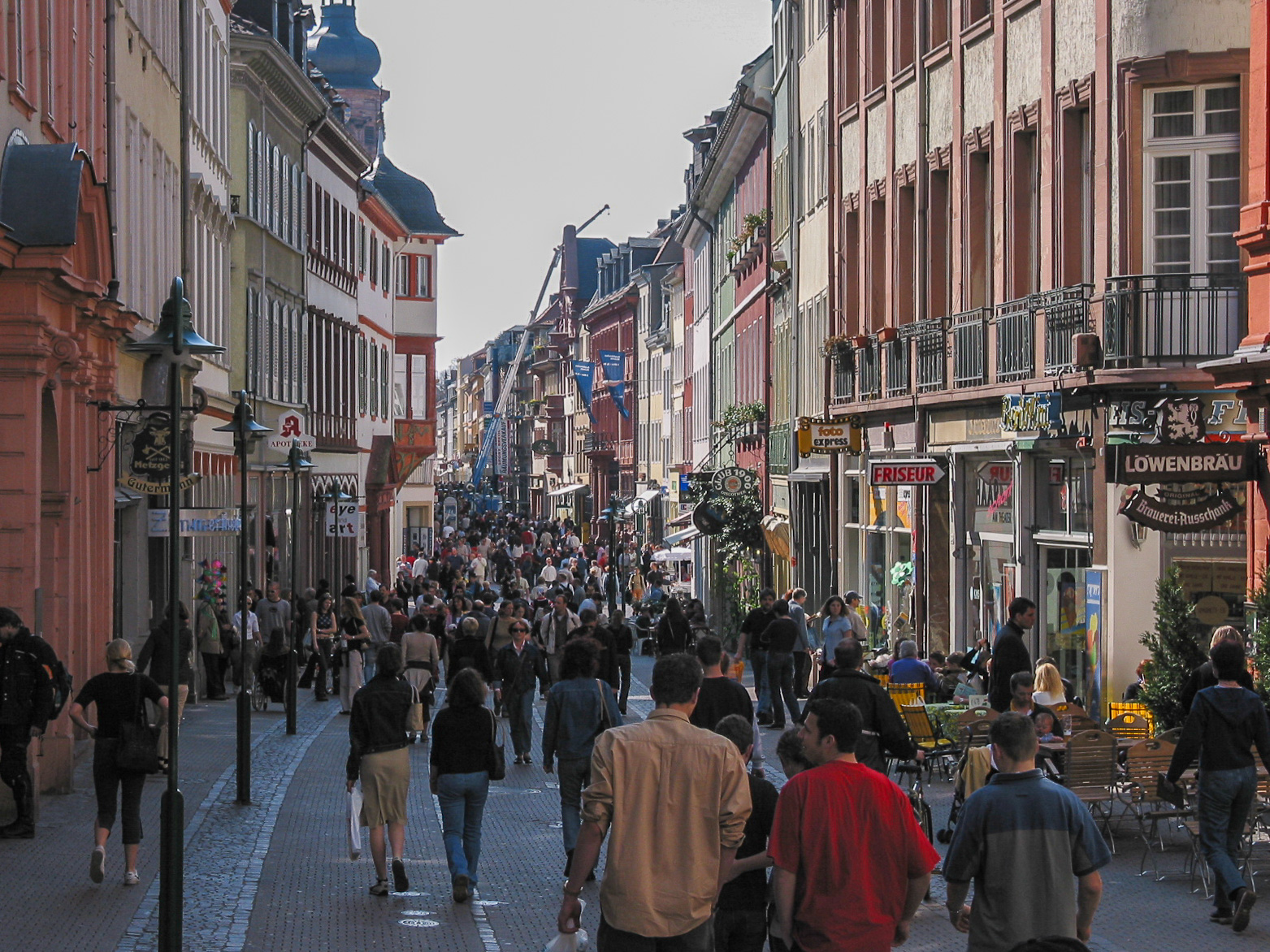
Main street Heidelberg

In 1945, the university was reopened relatively quickly on the initiative of a small group of professors, among whom were the anti-Nazi economist Alfred Weber and the philosopher Karl Jaspers. The surgeon Karl Heinrich Bauer was nominated rector.

On 9 December 1945, US Army General George S. Patton was involved in a car accident in the adjacent city of Mannheim and died in the Heidelberg US Army hospital on 21 December 1945. His funeral ceremony was held at the Heidelberg-Weststadt Christuskirche (Christ Church), and he was buried in the 3rd Army cemetery in Luxembourg.

During the post-war military occupation, the U.S. Army used the Thingstätte for cultural and religious events. Civilian use started in the early to mid-1980s for occasional concerts and other cultural events. Today, the celebrations on Hexennacht (German for 'Witches' Night'), also called Walpurgis Night, the night of 30 April, are a regular "underground" fixture at the Thingstätte. Thousands of mostly young people congregate there to drum, to breathe fire, and to juggle. The event has gained fame throughout the region, as well as a certain notoriety due to the amount of litter left behind. Officially, this event is forbidden due to security concerns. The City declares it will fence the Thingstätte and prosecute any trespassers.

== Population ==
Population growth

The population of the city of Heidelberg exceeded 100,000 for the first time in 1946. It is a city with an international population, including one of the largest American communities outside North America, but this factor is not included in official city statistics. In December 2011, the city had 149,633 inhabitants with an official primary residence in Heidelberg (not including the soldiers and employees of the U.S. Army and their dependents, a total of about 20,000 people), a historic high.

The following table shows the number of inhabitants within the boundaries of the city at the time. To 1833 they are mostly estimates, then census results or official updates of the statistical offices of the time or the city administration. The data refer from 1843 to the "local population", from 1925 to the resident population and since 1987 the "population at the site of their main dwelling." Prior to 1843 the population was determined by non-uniform collection procedures.

Heidelberg currently has a population of about 160,000 and is the 5th largest city in Baden-Württemberg. About 37,000 (24% of the population) are students, which makes Heidelberg one of the largest university cities in Germany. Heidelberg's population has grown since 1945 (after WWII) and has almost never declined due to the popularity of this city's academic and research strengths.

Historical population
Year	Pop.	±%
1439	5,200	—
1588	6,300	+21.2%
1784	10,754	+70.7%
1875	22,334	+107.7%
1900	40,121	+79.6%
1910	56,016	+39.6%
1919	60,831	+8.6%
1925	73,034	+20.1%
1933	84,641	+15.9%
1945	95,811	+13.2%
1950	116,488	+21.6%
1956	121,910	+4.7%
1961	125,264	+2.8%
1965	125,507	+0.2%
1970	129,656	+3.3%
1975	129,368	−0.2%
1980	133,227	+3.0%
1985	134,724	+1.1%
1990	136,796	+1.5%
1995	138,781	+1.5%
2000	140,259	+1.1%
2005	142,933	+1.9%
2010	147,312	+3.1%
2015	156,267	+6.1%
2020	159,245	+1.9%
Population size may be affected by changes in administrative divisions.

Foreign Citizens made up 21.5% of the total population.

Rank	Breakdown of foreign Citizens	Population (31 December 2023)
1	Turkey	7.9%
2	Ukraine	7.0%
3	Italy	6.1%
4	China	4.8%
5	India	4.6%
6	Other Nationalities	70.6%

With a fertility rate of 1.1 children per woman in the Stadtkreis (county), Heidelberg had the lowest fertility rate in Baden-Württemberg in 2008.

== Politics ==
Since 2006, the Oberbürgermeister (lord mayor) of Heidelberg has been the independent Eckart Würzner. From 1990 to 2006, the mayor was Beate Weber (SPD).

The council consists of 48 members with the mayor as chairman. The council is directly elected for a term of five years. The task of the council is to decide all the affairs of the city, with the mayor presiding. The council controls the city administration and oversees the enforcement of its decisions.

Heidelberg has always been a stronghold of The Greens. For the municipal elections in 2009, they split into the Green Alternative List and Alliance 90/The Greens and each ran their own lists. Together they gained 10 seats to become the strongest force for the first time. In September 2011, two members of the GAL Group joined the Alliance 90/The Greens, so that together with the members of generation.hd, they formed the largest group in the council.

For elections to the Bundestag, the city is part of the Heidelberg constituency.

=== Mayor and city council ===
The most recent mayoral election was held on 6 November 2022, with a runoff held on 27 November, and the results were as follows:

Candidate	Party	First round		Second round	
Candidate	Party	Votes	%	Votes	%
Eckart Würzner	Independent (CDU/FDP/FW)	25,111	45.9	25,487	54.0
Theresia Bauer	Alliance 90/The Greens	15,655	28.6	20,010	42.4
Sören Michelsburg	Social Democratic Party	7,410	13.5	Withdrew	
Sofia Leser	Independent	2,097	3.8	Withdrew	
Bernd Zieger	The Left	1,991	3.6	Withdrew	
Björn Leuzinger	Die PARTEI	982	1.8	1,562	3.3
Alina Papagiannaki-Sönmez	Heidelberg in Motion	799	1.5	Withdrew	
Mathias Schmitz	Independent	342	0.6	Withdrew	
Sassan Khajehali	Independent	271	0.5	Withdrew	
Other		67	0.1	113	0.2
Valid votes		54,715	99.7	47,172	99.5
Invalid votes		186	0.3	237	0.5
Total		54,901	100.0	47,409	100.0
Electorate/voter turnout		107,030	51.3	107,410	44.1
Source: City of Heidelberg (1st round, 2nd round)

The Heidelberg city council governs the city alongside the Mayor. The most recent city council election was held on 9 June 2024, and the results were as follows:

Party	Votes	%	+/-	Seats	+/-
Alliance 90/The Greens (Grüne)	828,031	26.4	▼5.5	13	▼3
Christian Democratic Union (CDU)	457,787	14.6	▼0.4	7	0
Social Democratic Party (SPD)	388,434	12.4	▼1.5	6	▼1
The Heidelbergers	336,053	10.7	▲3.7	5	▲2
Volt Germany (Volt)	180,828	5.8	New	3	New
Alternative for Germany (AfD)	174,115	5.5	▲0.5	3	▲1
The Left (Die Linke)	160,535	5.1	▼0.8	2	▼1
Free Democratic Party (FDP)	156,307	5.0	▼0.7	2	▼1
Heidelberg in Motion (HiB)	99,525	3.2	▲0.6	2	▲1
Green Alternative List (GAL)	96,971	3.1	▼1.6	1	▼1
Die PARTEI	82,226	2.6	▼0.1	1	0
Colourful Left (Bunte Linke)	66,997	2.1	▼1.8	1	▼1
Initiative for Democracy and Education (IDA)	55,975	1.8	New	1	New
Free Voter Association (FWV)	38,910	1.2	▼0.5	1	0
Sofia Leser List	12,619	0.4	New	0	New
Valid votes	3,135,313	100.0		48	±0
Invalid ballots	1,449	2.0			
Total ballots	69,807	100.0			
Electorate/voter turnout	107,904	66.0	▲1.1		
Source: City of Heidelberg

== Cityscape ==
=== The old town ===
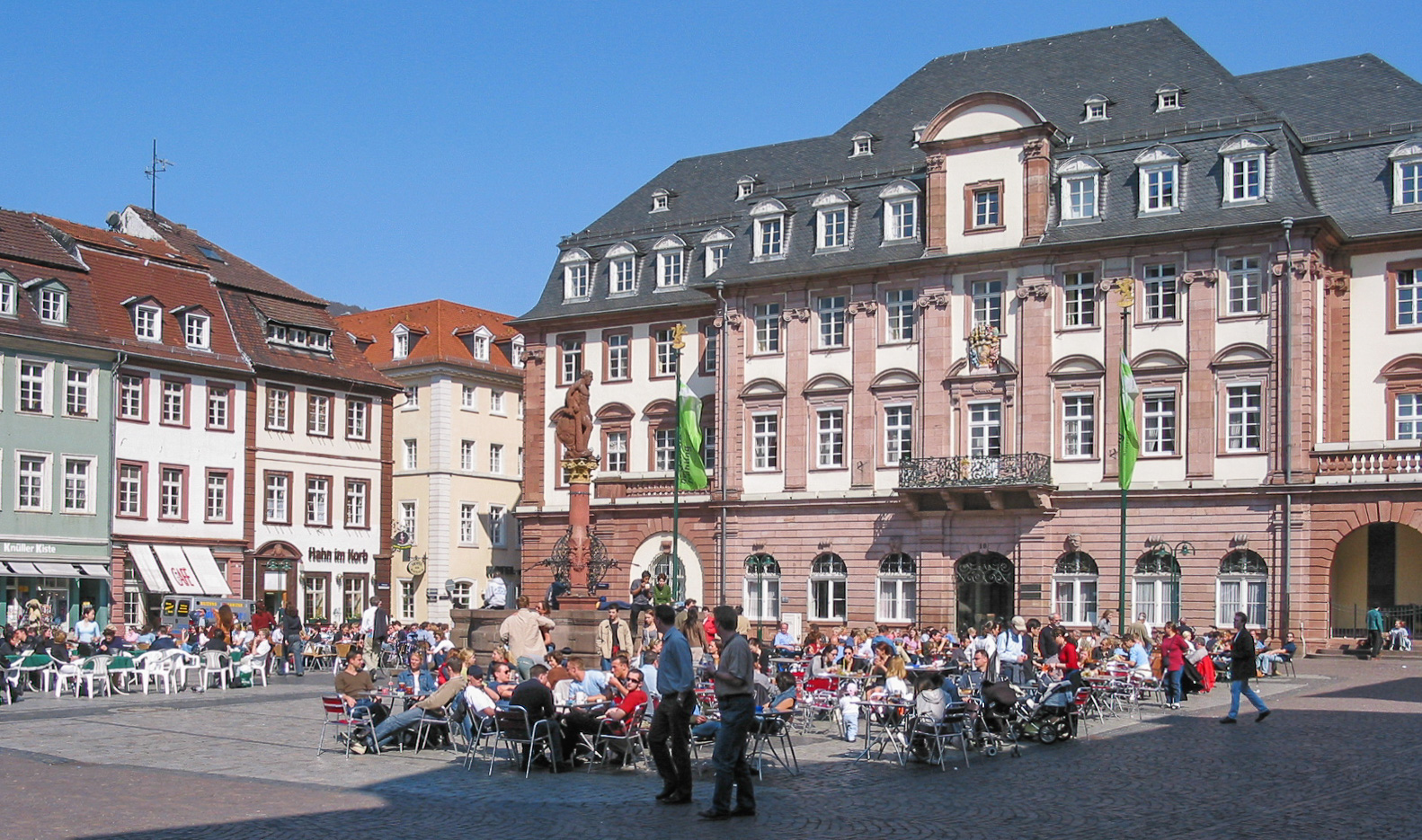
The marketplace, with Town Hall on the right

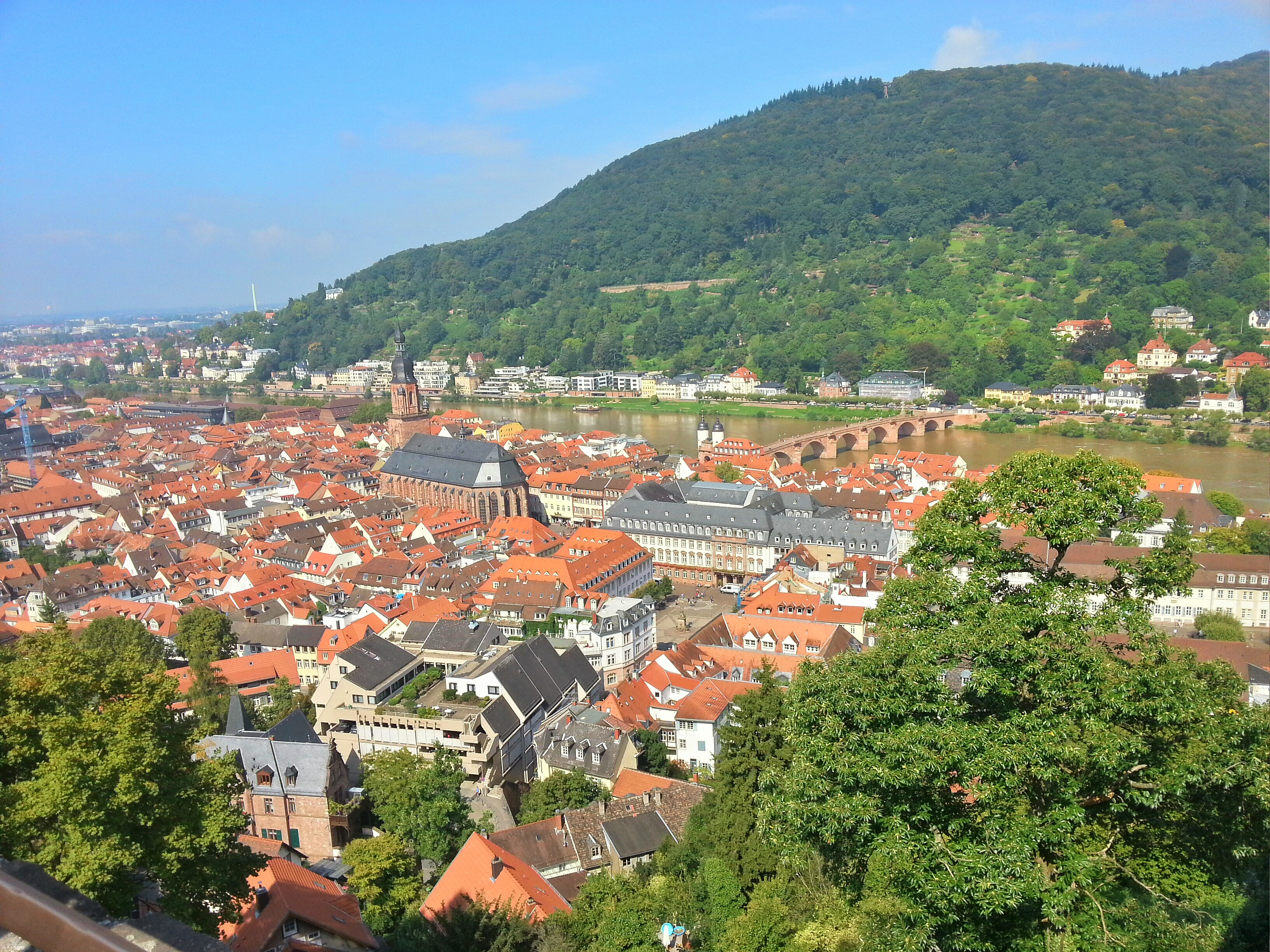
Heidelberg's old city centre from the castle above

Religion in Heidelberg (2011)
1. Protestant Church (34.9%)
2. Catholic Church (30.1%)
3. Orthodox Christianity (1.70%)
4. Evang. Free Church (1.20%)
5. Other state-recognised church/religious community (3.20%)
6. Islam (5.70%)
7. Others or nonreligious (23.2%)

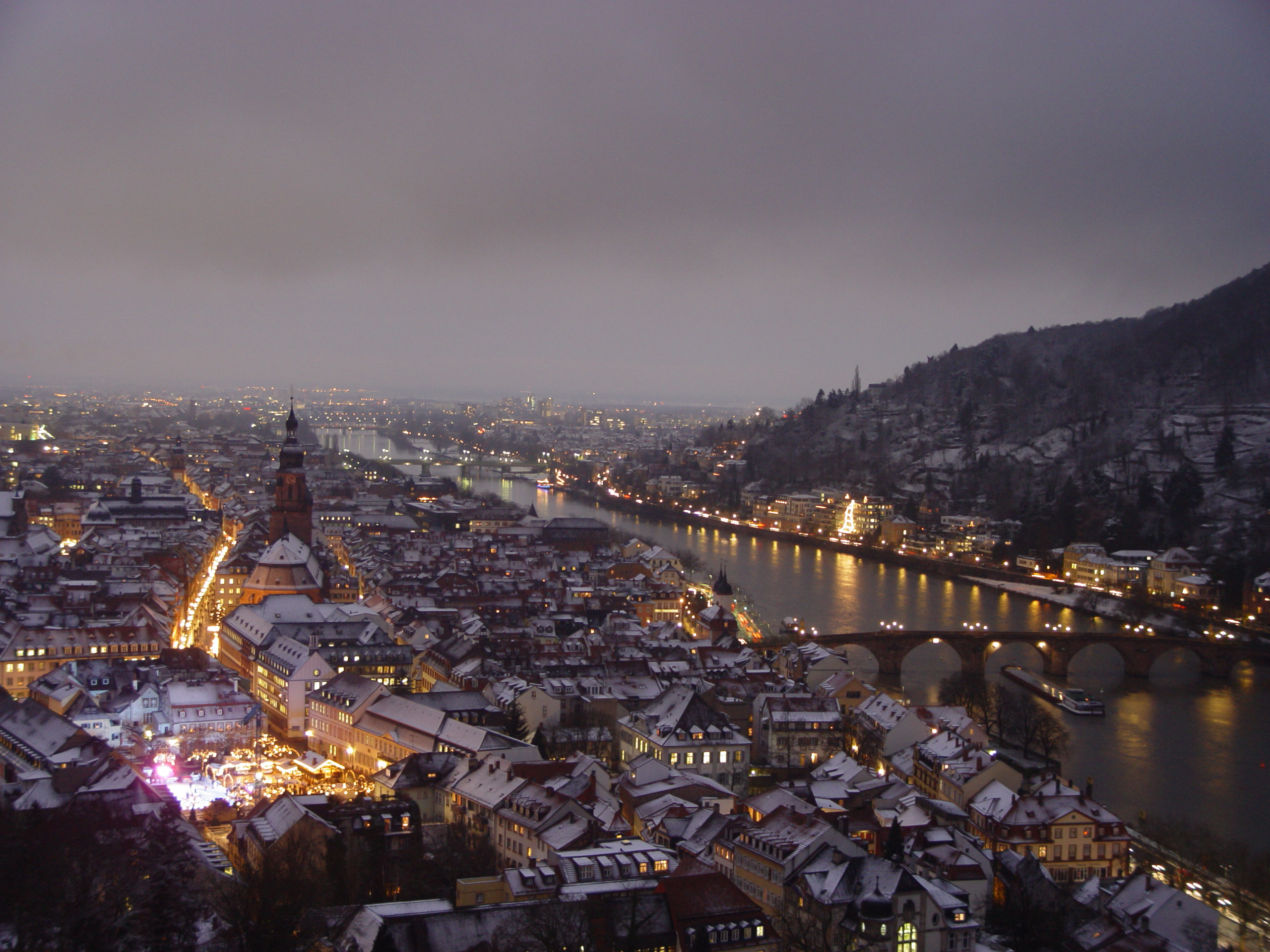
View from the castle during winter, 2014

The "old town" (German: Altstadt), on the south bank of the Neckar, is long and narrow. It is dominated by the ruins of Heidelberg Castle, 80 metres above the Neckar on the steep wooded slopes of the Königstuhl (King's chair or throne) hill.

- The Main Street (Hauptstrasse), a mile-long pedestrian street, running the length of the old town.
- The old stone bridge was erected 1786–1788. A medieval bridge gate is on the side of the old town, and was originally part of the town wall. Baroque tower helmets were added as part of the erection of the stone bridge in 1788.
- The Church of the Holy Spirit (Heiliggeistkirche), a late Gothic church in the marketplace of the old town.
- The Karls' gate (Karlstor) is a triumphal arch in honour of the Prince Elector Karl Theodor, located at Heidelberg's east side. It was built 1775–1781 and designed by Nicolas de Pigage.
- The house Zum Ritter Sankt Georg (Knight St. George) is one of the few buildings to survive the War of Succession. Standing across from the Church of the Holy Spirit, it was built in the style of the late Renaissance. It is named after the sculpture at the top.
- The Marstall (Stables), a 16th-century building on the Neckar that has served several purposes through its history. It is now a cafeteria for the university.

=== Heidelberg Castle ===
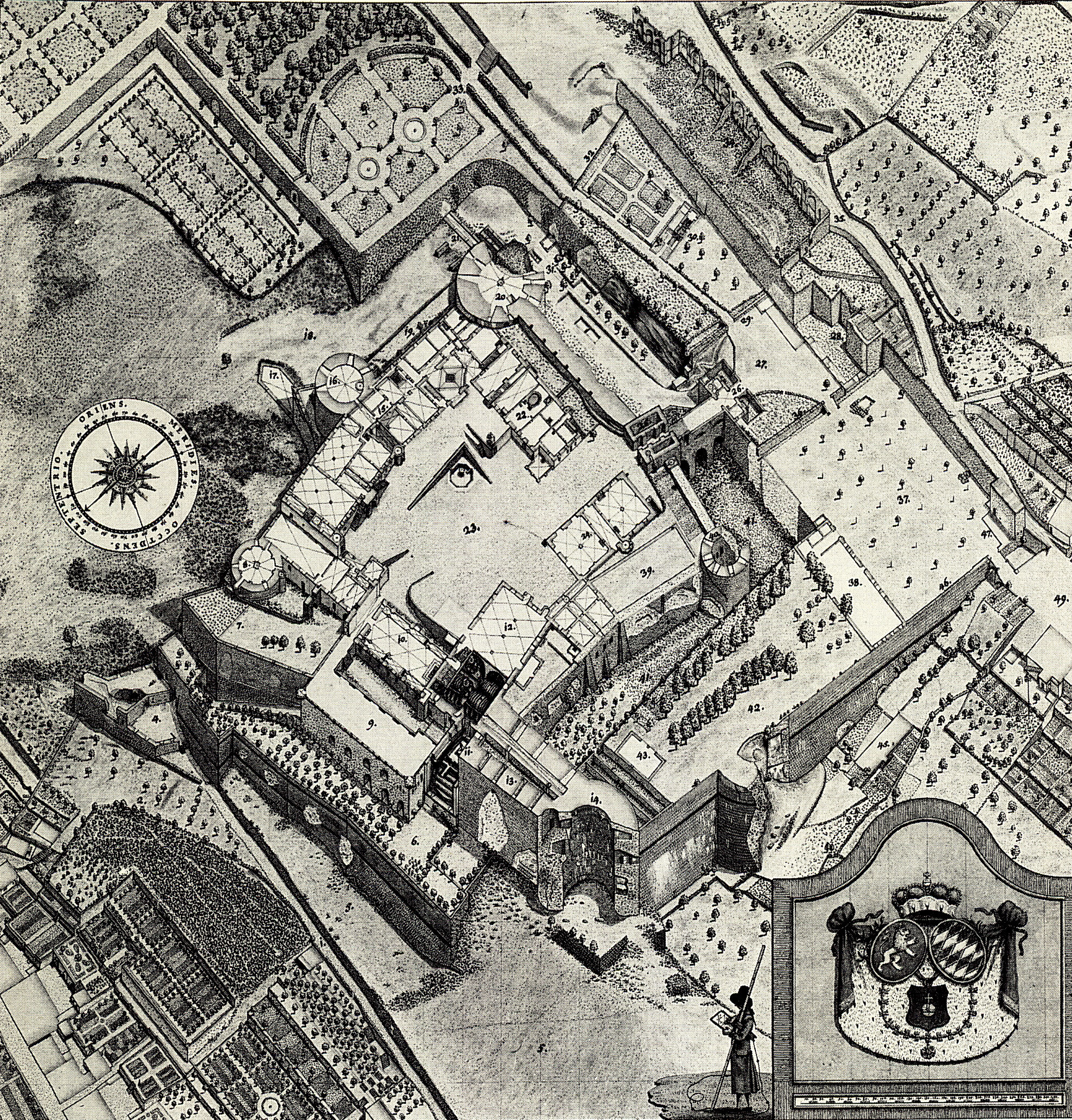
Historic map of Heidelberg Castle

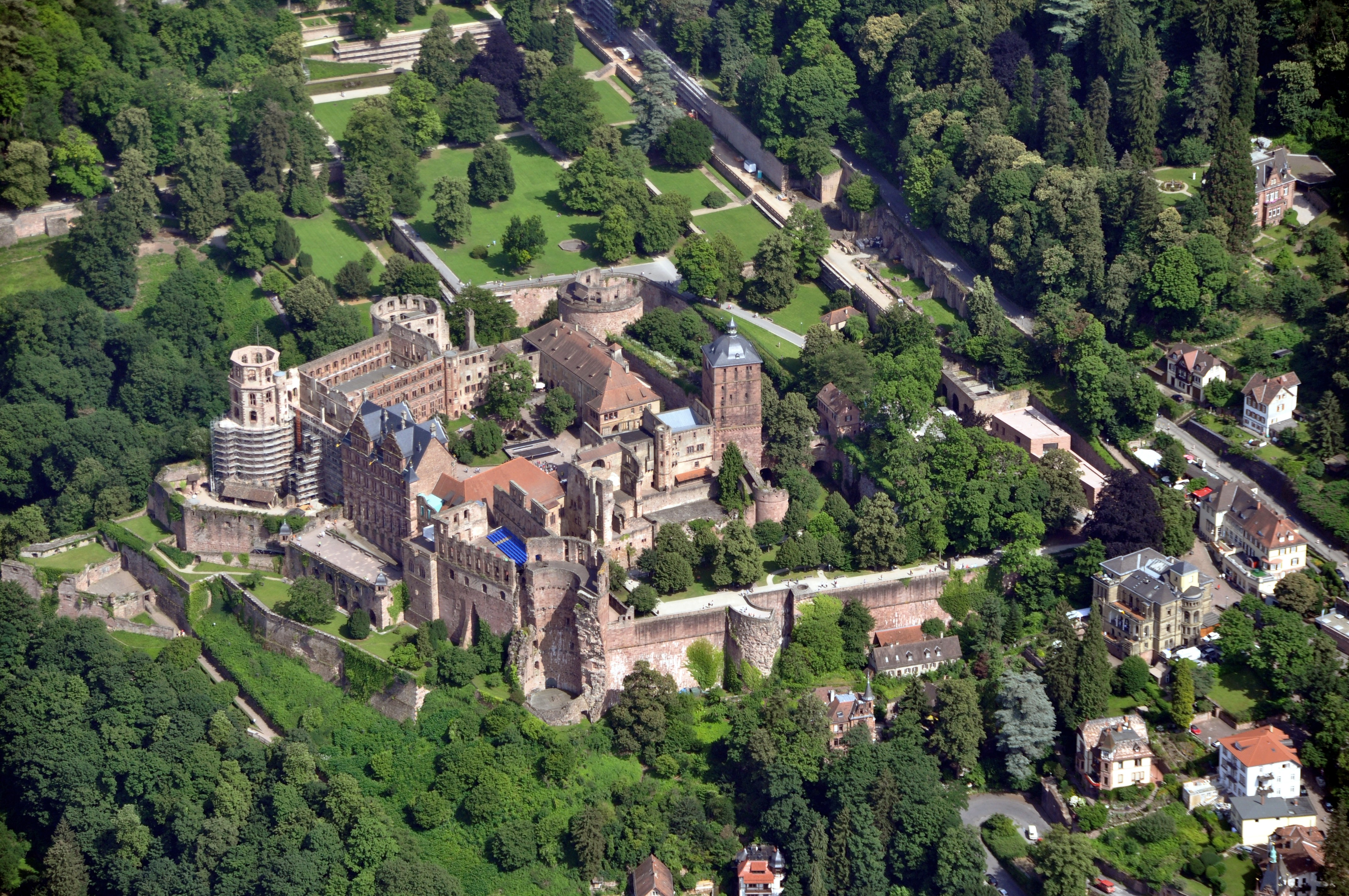
Aerial view of Heidelberg Castle

The castle is a mix of styles from Gothic to Renaissance. Prince Elector Ruprecht III (1398–1410) erected the first building in the inner courtyard as a royal residence. The building was divided into a ground floor made of stone and framework upper levels. Another royal building is located opposite the Ruprecht Building: the Fountain Hall. Prince Elector Philipp (1476–1508) is said to have arranged the transfer of the hall's columns from a decayed palace of Charlemagne from Ingelheim to Heidelberg.

In the 16th and 17th centuries, the Prince Electors added two palace buildings and turned the fortress into a castle. The two dominant buildings at the eastern and northern side of the courtyard were erected during the rule of Ottheinrich (1556–1559) and Friedrich IV (1583–1610). Under Friedrich V (1613–1619), the main building of the west side was erected, the so-called "English Building".

The castle and its garden were destroyed several times during the Thirty Years' War and the Palatine War of Succession. As Prince Elector Karl Theodor tried to restore the castle, lightning struck in 1764, and ended all attempts at rebuilding. Later on, the castle was misused as a quarry; stones from the castle were taken to build new houses in Heidelberg. This was stopped in 1800 by Count Charles de Graimberg, who then began the process of preserving the castle.

Although the interior is in Gothic style, the King's Hall was not built until 1934. Today, the hall is used for festivities, e.g. dinner banquets, balls and theatre performances. During the Heidelberg Castle Festival in the summer, the courtyard is the site of open air musicals, operas, theatre performances, and classical concerts performed by the Heidelberg Philharmonics.

The castle is surrounded by a park, where the famous poet Johann von Goethe once walked. The Heidelberger Bergbahn funicular railway runs from Kornmakt to the summit of the Königstuhl via the castle.

The castle looks over the entire city of Heidelberg and the Neckar Valley.

=== Philosophers' Walk ===
On the northern side of the Neckar is located the Heiligenberg (Saints' Mountain), along the side of which runs the Philosophers' Walk (German: Philosophenweg), with scenic views of the old town and castle. Traditionally, Heidelberg's philosophers and university professors would walk and talk along the pathway. Farther up the mountain lie the ruined 11th-century Monastery of St. Michael, the smaller Monastery of St. Stephen, a Nazi-era amphitheater, the so-called Pagan's hole and the remains of an earthen Celtic hill fort from the 4th century BC.

View from the so-called "Philosophers' Walk" (German: Philosophenweg) towards the Old Town, with Heidelberg Castle, Heiliggeist Church and the Old Bridge

=== Heidelberg churches ===
There are many historical churches in Heidelberg and its surroundings. The Church of the Holy Spirit has been shared over the centuries since the Protestant Reformation by both Catholics and Protestants. It is one of the few buildings to survive the many wars during the past centuries. It was rebuilt after the French set fire to it in 1709 during the War of the Palatinian Succession. The church has remains of the tombs and epitaphs of the past Palatinate electors. This Church stands in the Marktplatz next to the seat of local government. In 1720, Karl III Philip, Elector Palatine came into conflict with the town's Protestants as a result of giving the Church of the Holy Spirit exclusively to the Catholics for their use. It had previously been split by a partition and used by both congregations. Due to pressure by the mostly Protestant powers of Prussia, Holland, and Sweden, Prince Karl III Philip gave way and repartitioned the church for joint use. In 1936 the separating wall was removed. The church is now exclusively used by Protestants. Furthermore, there is the Catholic Church of the Jesuits. Its construction began in 1712. It was completed with the addition of a bell tower from 1866 to 1872. The church is also home to the Museum für sakrale Kunst und Liturgie (Museum of Ecclesiastical Arts). The oldest church in Heidelberg is the St. Peter's Church (now Lutheran). It was built some time during the 12th century.

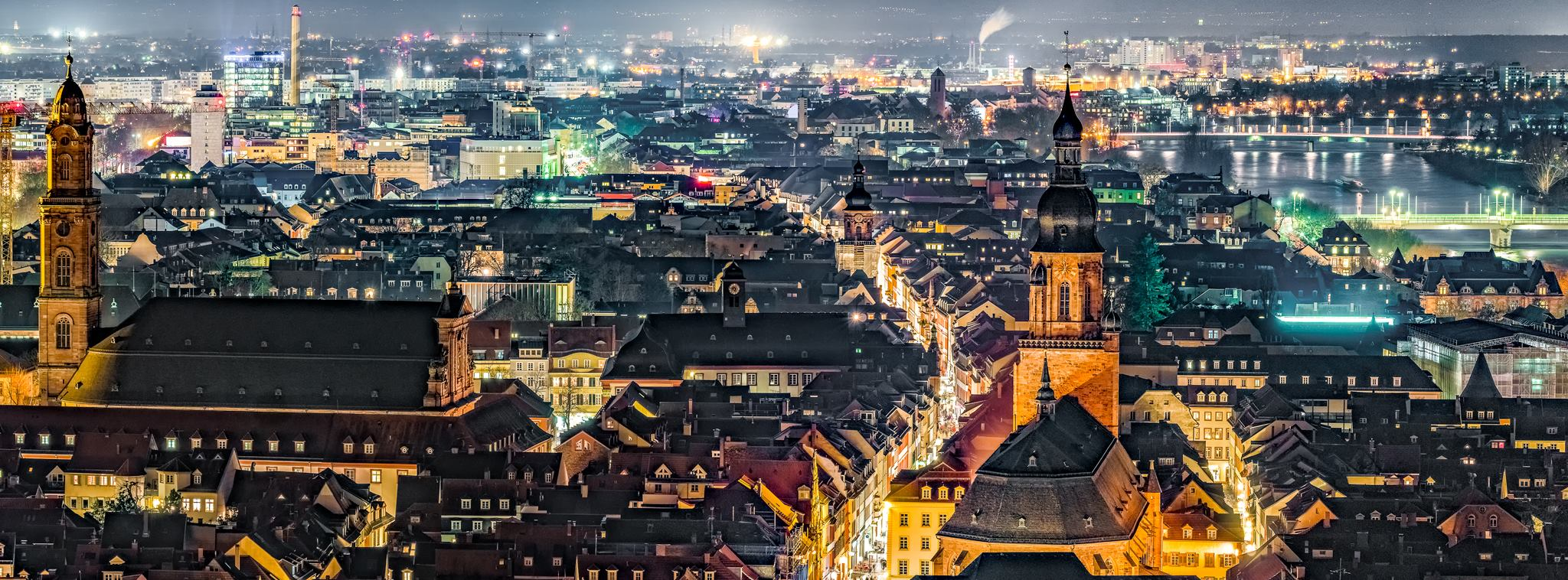
From left: Jesuit Church, Providence Church and Church of the Holy Spirit in Heidelberg's Old Town on the Neckar River

== Education ==
=== Universities and academia ===
Heidelberg is known for its institutions of higher education. The most famous of those is Heidelberg University. Founded in 1386, it is one of Europe's oldest institutions. In fact, Heidelberg is the oldest university town of today's Germany. Among the prominent thinkers associated with the institution are Georg Wilhelm Friedrich Hegel, Karl Jaspers, Hans-Georg Gadamer, Jürgen Habermas, Karl-Otto Apel, and Hannah Arendt. The campus is situated in two urban areas and several buildings. In numerous historical buildings in the old town there are the Faculties of the Humanities, the Social Science, and the Faculty of Law. The school of applied sciences is located in the Science Tower in Wieblingen. The Faculties of Medicine and Natural Science are settled on the Neuenheimer Feld Campus.

The campus of Heidelberg University has a total undergraduate enrollment of 30,898 as of 2014. The enrollment rate of this university is 16.3 percent. Less than 20 percent of the total student body is international. This university has many areas of study for national students such as; theology, law, philosophy, modern languages, economics, and social sciences. The university does not charge students for tuition. The school's academic calendar is semester based, and the majority of the language for instruction is in German. For international students the academic calendar is based on a block schedule. The international students attend in block periods of 5 weeks. The University or "Uni" is spread across three campuses each containing different fields of study.

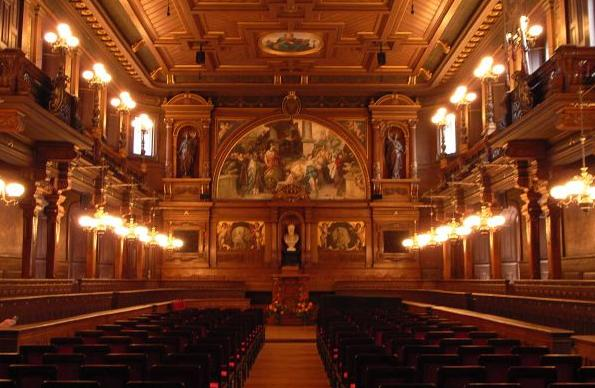
Old university hall

Since 1904 there has been a College of Educational Science, the Pädagogische Hochschule Heidelberg; since 1979 there has been a college of Jewish Studies, the Hochschule für Jüdische Studien Heidelberg. It comprises nine branches specializing in both religion and Jewish culture. The Schiller International University, a private American university is also represented with a campus in Heidelberg offering several undergraduate and graduate programs in the fields of International Business and International Relations and Diplomacy.

=== Research ===
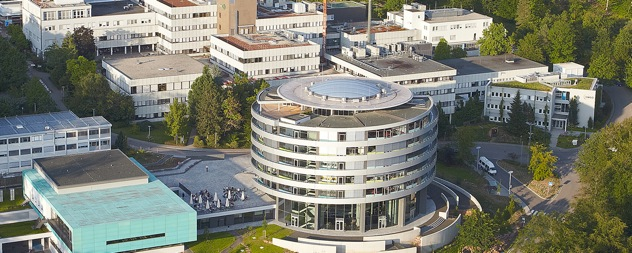
Buildings of European Molecular Biology Laboratory in Heidelberg, including the new Advanced Training Centre

In addition to the research centers and institutes of the university, there are numerous research institutions situated in the city of Heidelberg. Among them are the European Molecular Biology Laboratory (EMBL), European Molecular Biology Organization (EMBO), the German Cancer Research Center (DKFZ), Max Planck Institute for Medical Research, Max Planck Institute for Astronomy, Max Planck Institute for Nuclear Physics, Max Planck Institute for Comparative Public Law and International Law.

=== Schools ===
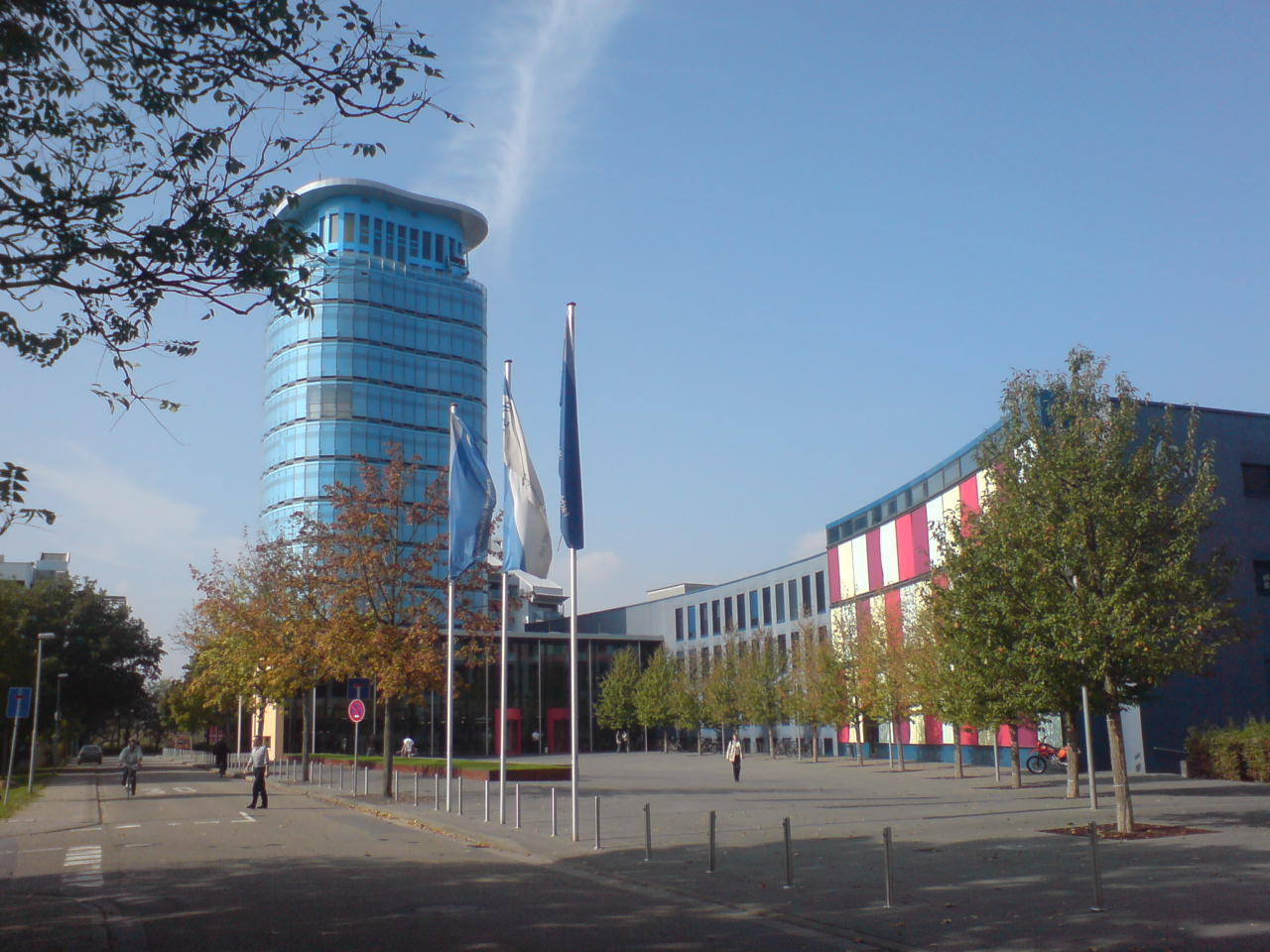
SRH Hochschule Heidelberg is one of the oldest and largest private universities in Germany.

Heidelberg is home to 23 elementary schools. There are several institutions of secondary education, both public and private, representing all levels of the German school system. There are 14 Gymnasiums, with six of them private. With 52% of secondary students attending a Gymnasium, Heidelberg sits above the German average, perhaps because a large number of academics live in Heidelberg and its environs.

The gymnasiums include the Kurfürst-Friedrich-Gymnasium, Bunsen-Gymnasium, Helmholtz-Gymnasium, Hölderlin-Gymnasium and Elisabeth-von-Thadden-Schule. Then there are seven Realschule, ten Hauptschule, and nine vocational schools (the so-called Berufsschule). In addition, there are several folk high schools with different specialisations. Heidelberg International School serves the local expatriate community.

== Economy ==
=== Tourism ===
In 2004, 81.8% of people worked for service industries, including tourism. As a relic of the period of Romanticism, Heidelberg has been labeled a "Romantic town". This is used to attract more than 11.9 million visitors every year. Many events are organized to attract visitors. One of the biggest tourist attractions is the Christmas market during the winter time.

=== Industry ===
Only 18% of employment is provided by industry. Printing and publishing are important enterprises; nearby Walldorf is a center of the IT industry and SAP World Headquarters. Noted pen manufacturer Lamy has its headquarters and factory in Heidelberg-Wieblingen. Heidelberger Druckmaschinen has its headquarters here; its factory is located in Walldorf. Soft-drink company Wild-Werke, manufacturer of the Capri-Sonne (Capri-Sun in the U.S.) is located nearby in Eppelheim. Heidelberg is also home to the headquarters of HeidelbergCement, the world's second largest cement producer. The company has its roots in the suburb of Leimen where one of its cement plants is still located. With its long Hauptstraße, Heidelberg is a shopping destination for people from the surrounding smaller towns.

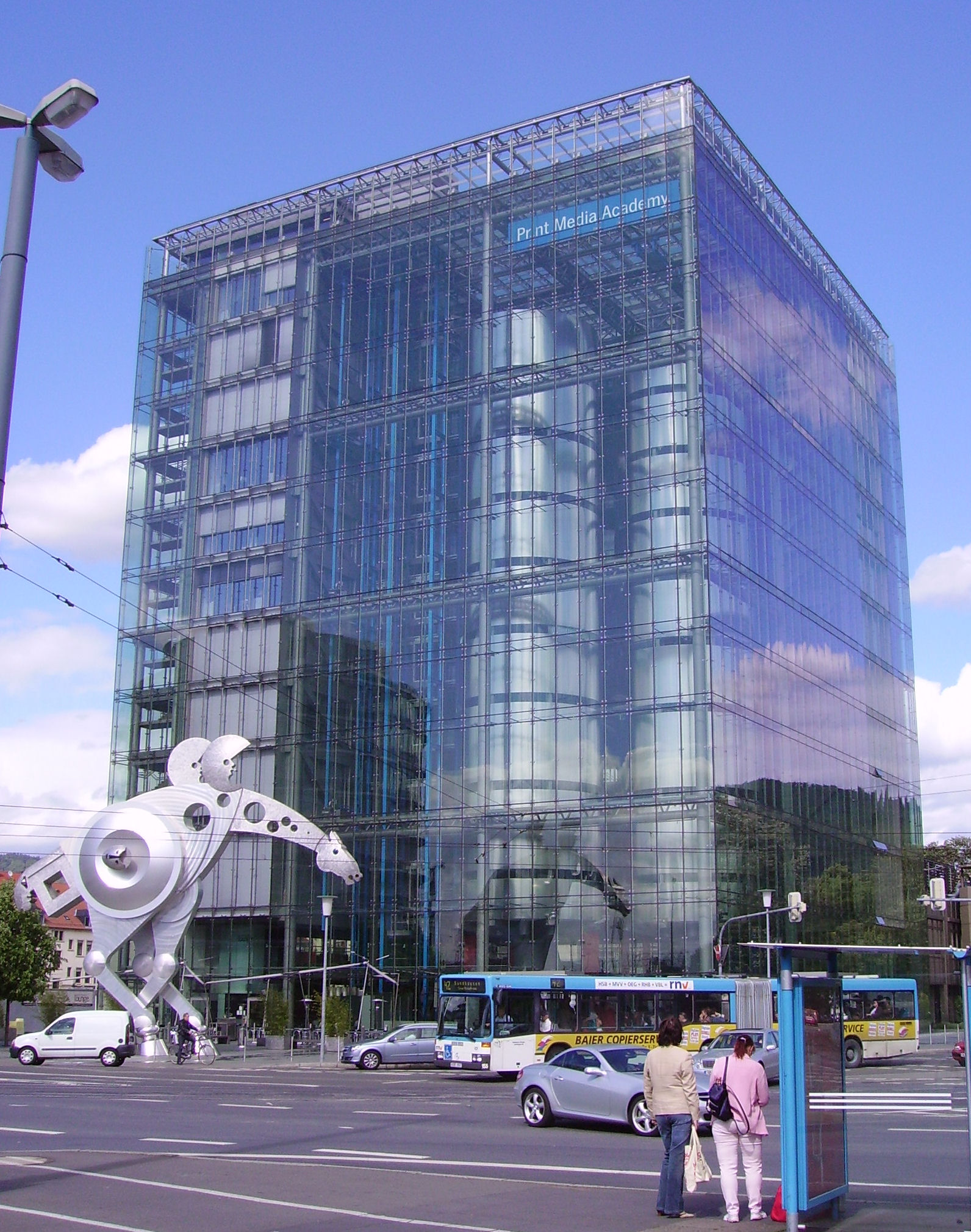
Print Media Academy

=== Roads ===
The A 5 autobahn runs through the western outskirts of Heidelberg, connecting the region to Frankfurt am Main in the north and Karlsruhe to the south. The A 656 commences just west of the city, connecting Heidelberg with Mannheim. Both highways meet at Heidelberg autobahn intersection in the city of Heidelberg, and the A 656 connects to the A 6 at the Mannheim autobahn intersection, which connects to the east towards Stuttgart.

Furthermore, the B 3 (Frankfurt–Karlsruhe) runs north–south through the town, and the B 37 (Mannheim–Eberbach) runs east–west. Both meet in the city center at the Bismarckplatz. The B 535 begin in the south of Heidelberg and runs to Schwetzingen.

==== Tourist roads ====
Heidelberg is located on four tourist roads: Bergstraße, Bertha Benz Memorial Route, Castle Road, and Straße der Demokratie (Road of Democracy).

=== Railways ===
Heidelberg Central Station (Hauptbahnhof) is on the Rhine Valley Railway and is served by Intercity-Express, Euro City trains. This station is served by the RheinNeckar S-Bahn. There is also a station for intercity bus services outside the central station.

=== Public transport ===
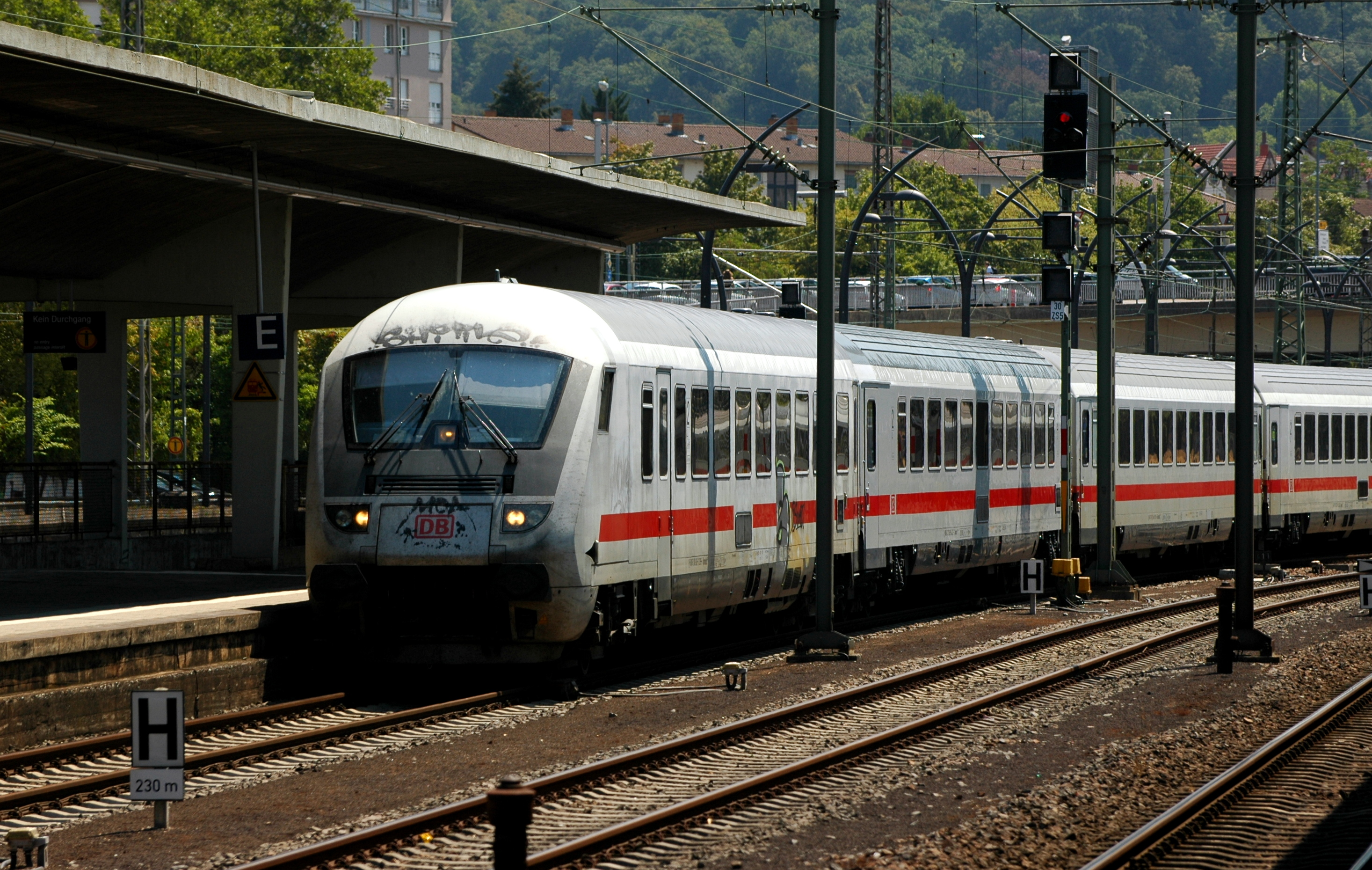
DB train Heidelberg Hauptbahnhof

The main transport hub of Heidelberg is the Bismarckplatz. Several main thoroughfares of the city intersect here and one of the longest pedestrian streets in Europe, the Hauptstraße (main street) runs from here through the entire old town of Heidelberg. Heidelberg Central Station was nearby for many years, which was a combined terminal and through station. In 1955, it was moved about 1.5 km further to the west, which removed the necessity for trains continuing north or south to reverse. The new central station became the second major transport hub of Heidelberg.

Heidelberg has had a public transport service since 1883, when horse-drawn trams were established. Due to the rapidly rising patronage it was decided on 20 December 1901 to convert the Heidelberg tramway network to electrical operation. On 16 March 1902, the first electric tram ran on Rohrbacher Straße, sharing use of the suburban tracks built by the Deutsche Eisenbahn-Gesellschaft in 1901 between Heidelberg and Wiesloch. Until the 1950s, the tram network was expanded a bit at a time. The rapidly growing popularity of car transport presented the operator of the trams with increasingly difficult problems and the tram network was gradually dismantled. It was not until 10 December 2006 that the network was extended again with the opening of a new tram line from Kirchheim. Tram and bus services are now operated by Rhein-Neckar-Verkehr (RNV). Since 1989, all fares are set under a uniform scheme by the Verkehrsverbund Rhein-Neckar (Rhine-Neckar Transport Association, VRN). Carsharing increasingly provides a complement to public transport. More than 50 car-sharing stations are available to users in 12 of the 14 districts of Heidelberg offering a total of more than 100 cars.

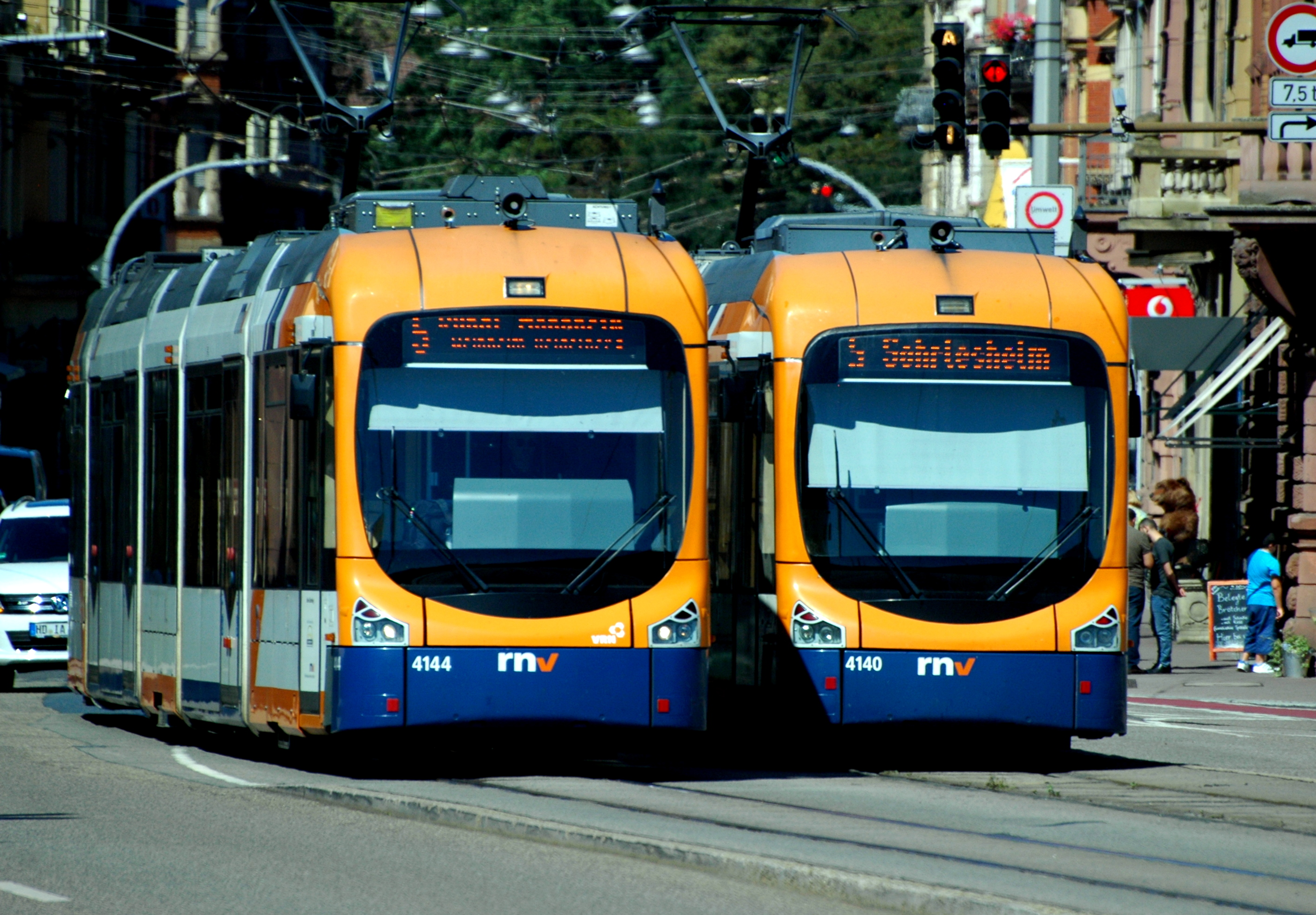
Trams in Heidelberg

Since 14 December 2003, Heidelberg has been connected to the network of the Rhine-Neckar S-Bahn, which opens up the entire Rhine-Neckar region, with lines connecting with the Palatinate, the Saarland, and southern Hesse.

The Heidelberger Bergbahn (Heidelberg Mountain Railway) has run since 2005 with new cars on the lower part from Kornmarkt to Molkenkur and historic cars built in 1907 on the upper section of the funicular from Molkenkur to Königstuhl. It is one of the most popular means to reach Heidelberg Castle. The first plans for the funicular were drawn up in 1873. Due to a lack of funds, the first section of the funicular was not opened until 1890. In 2004, the upper section of the funicular was listed as part of the heritage of the state of Baden-Württemberg.

=== United States military installations ===
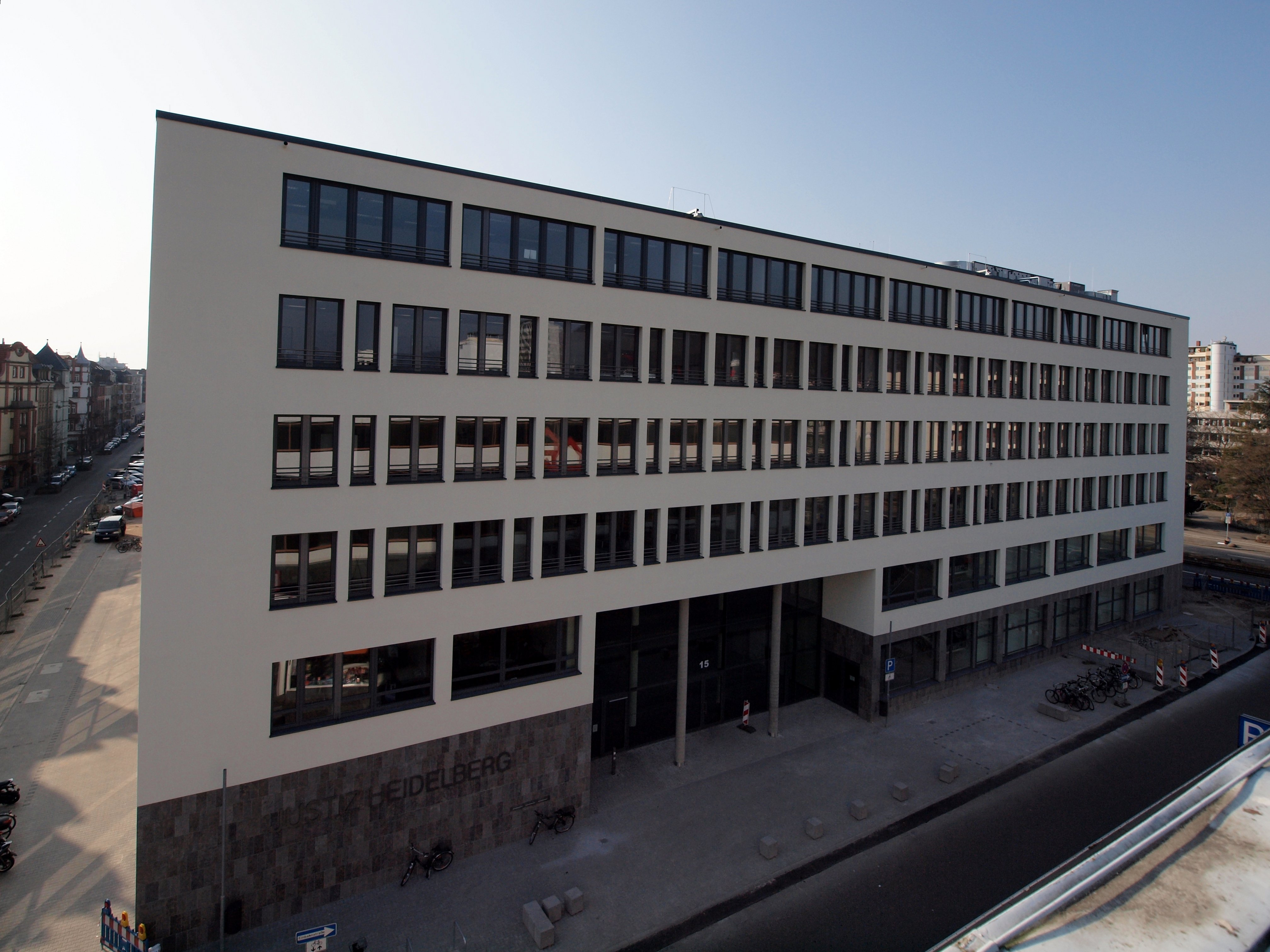
Behördenzentrum Heidelberg

During World War II, Heidelberg was one of the few major cities in Germany not significantly damaged by Allied bombing. Situated in the American Zone of Germany, Heidelberg became the headquarters of the American forces in Europe. The main military facilities were Campbell Barracks, the former Wehrmacht Grossdeutschland-Kaserne, which housed the US Army, Europe (USAREUR) and NATO's Component Command-Land Headquarters. (Until 2004, this was designated Joint Headquarters Centre, and before that, LANDCENT).

Campbell Barracks and Mark Twain Village were both in Südstadt; Patton Barracks was in nearby Kirchheim. Nachrichten Kaserne in Rohrbach was home to the former Heidelberg Army Hospital, later designated the Heidelberg Health Center. Patrick Henry Village, the largest U.S. military housing area in the Heidelberg area, was west of Kirchheim. These installations, including Tompkins Barracks and Kilbourne Kaserne in nearby Schwetzingen, plus the Germersheim Depot, made up the U.S. Army Garrison Heidelberg. Tompkins Barracks was home to U.S. Army Installation Management Command Europe Region. The Heidelberg U.S. Army Air Field (Heidelberg AAF) was converted to an heliport (mostly Blackhawk Helicopters) after the NATO Kosovo campaign.

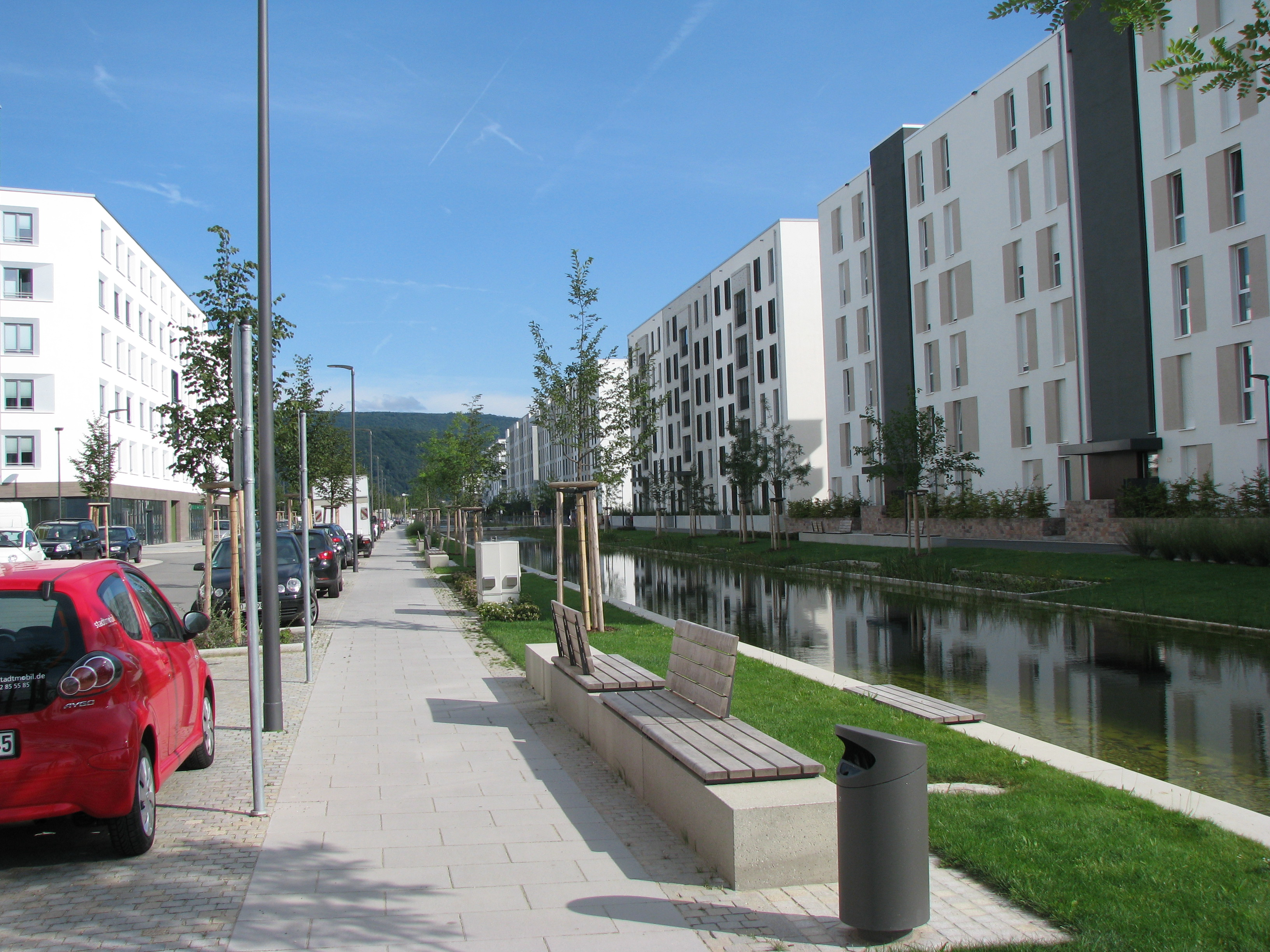
The New city district of Heidelberg, Bahnstadt, is one of the biggest passive house settlements in the world.

The children of United States Department of Defense employees based in Heidelberg attended on-base schools operated by the DODDS-E (Department of Defense Dependents Schools – Europe). There were three schools of this kind: Heidelberg High School in Mark Twain Village (Mark Twain Elementary School closed at the completion of the 2010–2011 school year), and Heidelberg Middle School and Patrick Henry Elementary in Patrick Henry Village.

On 19 October 2009, the U.S. Army announced that it would be building new headquarters for USAREUR in Wiesbaden. The move from Heidelberg took place in 2012 and 2013, and was completed in 2014. By 2015 all United States forces had left Heidelberg. The barracks and the housing areas were returned to the German state for conversion to civilian use.

== Culture ==
=== Events ===
Several festivals and events hosted and organized in Heidelberg throughout the year. In February, the Ball der Vampire (Ball of the Vampires) is arranged and Fasching, the equivalent of Mardi Gras or Carnival in some German regions, with a giant vampire-themed costume party at the local castle or city hall is celebrated. In March or April the Heidelberger Frühling, the Classic Music Festival and the international Easter egg market are conducted. During the last weekend of April there is an annually organized half marathon. In the summertime there are the Frühlingsmesse on the Messeplatz (May) and Illumination of the castle and bridge with lights and fireworks take place. In September, on the last Saturday the Old Town Autumn Festival is held. It includes a Medieval Market, an arts and crafts market, a flea market, and music from Samba to Rock. During October or November there are the Heidelberger Theater Days and the Enjoy Jazz festival. Every year in November the International Filmfestival Mannheim-Heidelberg take place in the city, too. The festival presents arthouse films of international newcomer directors and is held jointly by both of the cities. During Christmas there is a Christmas market throughout the oldest part of the city. A famous gift is the chocolate called Heidelberger Studentenkuss (student kiss).

=== Cinemas ===
The nationwide trend of cinema closures hit Heidelberg harder than many other places in Germany.

Recent years saw the low-point of this development, when in this city of over 150,000 people there were just three small cinemas left, with a total capacity of under 450 seats. The situation has slightly improved since late 2017, when Heidelberg got a new multiplex adjacent to the new Bahnstadt development, the "Luxor Filmpalast".

Luxor shows mainly Blockbuster movies in German, but some showings in English are on offer for selected films.

The small 2-screen cinema "Gloria/Gloriette" (Old Town), together with the affiliated "Kamera" (Neuenheim) offers arthouse and independent films, with some showings being offered in the films original language, usually with German subtitles.

The non-profit "Karlstorkino" (at the far eastern edge of the Old Town, next to the river) offers international arthouse fare and the occasional documentary. The vast majority of non-German films at this cinema are shown in their original language with either English or German subtitles, depending on the film.

=== Museums and exhibitions ===
Among the most prominent museums of Heidelberg are for instance the Carl Bosch Museum which shows life and work of chemist and Nobel Prize-winner Carl Bosch. Then there is the Documentation and Culture Centre of German Sinti and Roma (Dokumentations- und Kulturzentrum Deutscher Sini und Roma) describing the Nazi genocide of the Sinti and Roma peoples. The German Packing Museum (Deutsches Verpackungsmuseum) gives an overview of the history of packing and wrapping goods, whereas the German Pharmacy Museum (Deutsches Apothekenmuseum) which is located in the castle illustrates the history of Pharmacy in Germany. The Kurpfälzisches Museum (Palatinate Museum) offers a great art collection and some Roman archeological artifacts from the region. In honour of Friedrich Ebert the President Friedrich Ebert Memorial, which commemorates the life of Germany's first democratic head of state, was established. Besides, there are guided tours in most of the historical monuments of Heidelberg, as well as organized tourist tours through the city available in several languages.

=== Heidelberg Romanticism ===
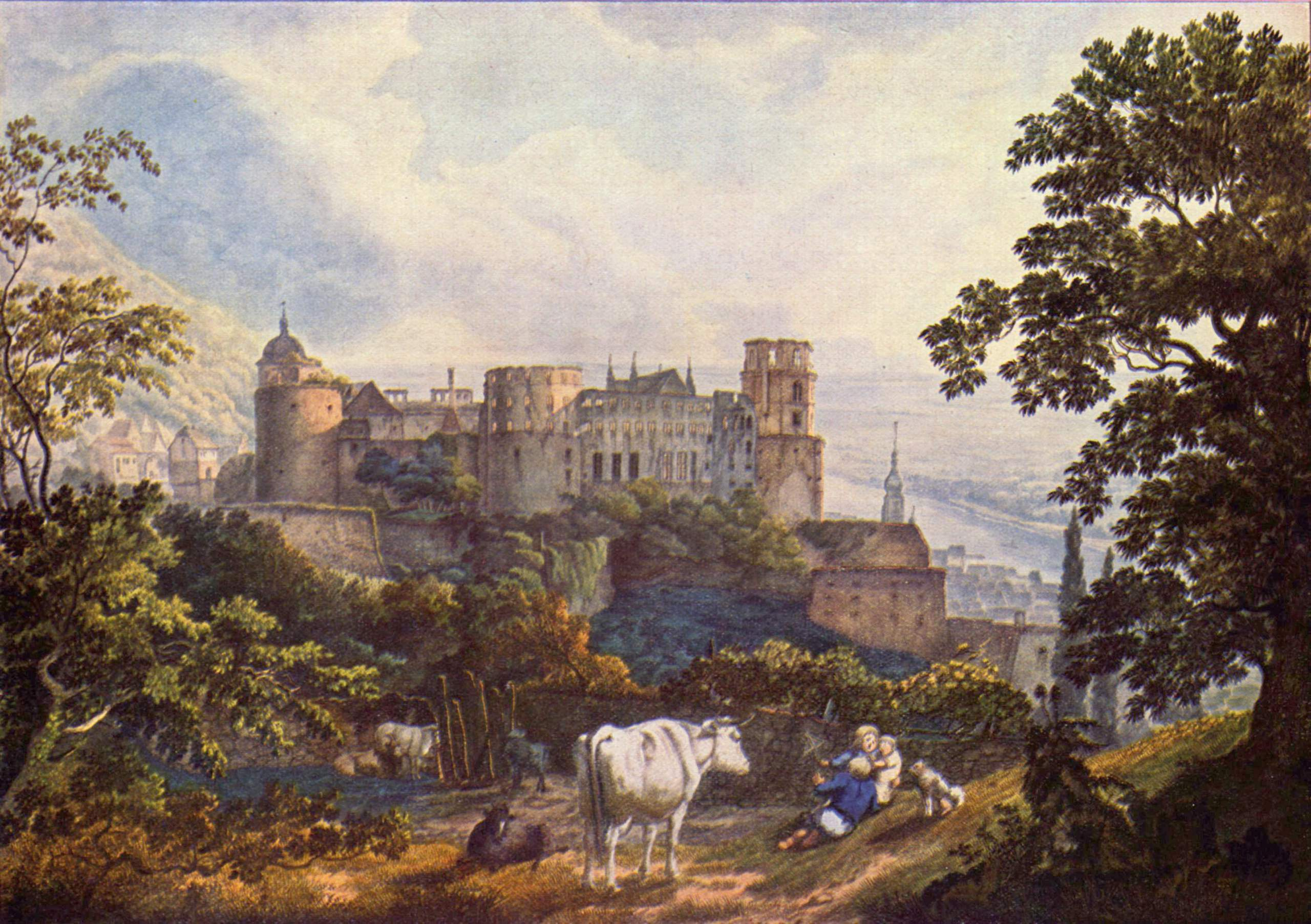
Romantic view of Heidelberg Castle ruins by Karl Philipp Fohr, 1815, Hessisches Landesmuseum Darmstadt

Heidelberg was the centre of the epoch of Romantik (Romanticism) in Germany. The phase after Jena Romanticism is often called Heidelberg Romanticism (see also Berlin Romanticism). There was a famous circle of poets (the Heidelberg Romantics), such as Joseph von Eichendorff, Johann Joseph von Görres, Ludwig Achim von Arnim, and Clemens Brentano. A relic of Romanticism is the Philosophers' Walk (German: Philosophenweg), a scenic walking path on the nearby Heiligenberg, overlooking Heidelberg.

The Romantik epoch of German philosophy and literature, was described as a movement against classical and realistic theories of literature, a contrast to the rationality of the Age of Enlightenment. It elevated medievalism and elements of art and narrative perceived to be from the medieval period. It also emphasized folk art, nature, and an epistemology based on nature, which included human activity conditioned by nature in the form of language, custom and usage.

=== Old Heidelberg ===
In 1901 Wilhelm Meyer-Förster wrote the play Old Heidelberg which was followed by a large number of film adaptations. It was the basis for Sigmund Romberg's 1924 operetta The Student Prince which was itself turned into a film of the same title.

=== "I Lost My Heart in Heidelberg" ===
The 1925 song "I Lost My Heart in Heidelberg" composed by Fred Raymond was a major hit and inspired a stage musical and two films. It remains the theme song of Heidelberg.

== Sport ==
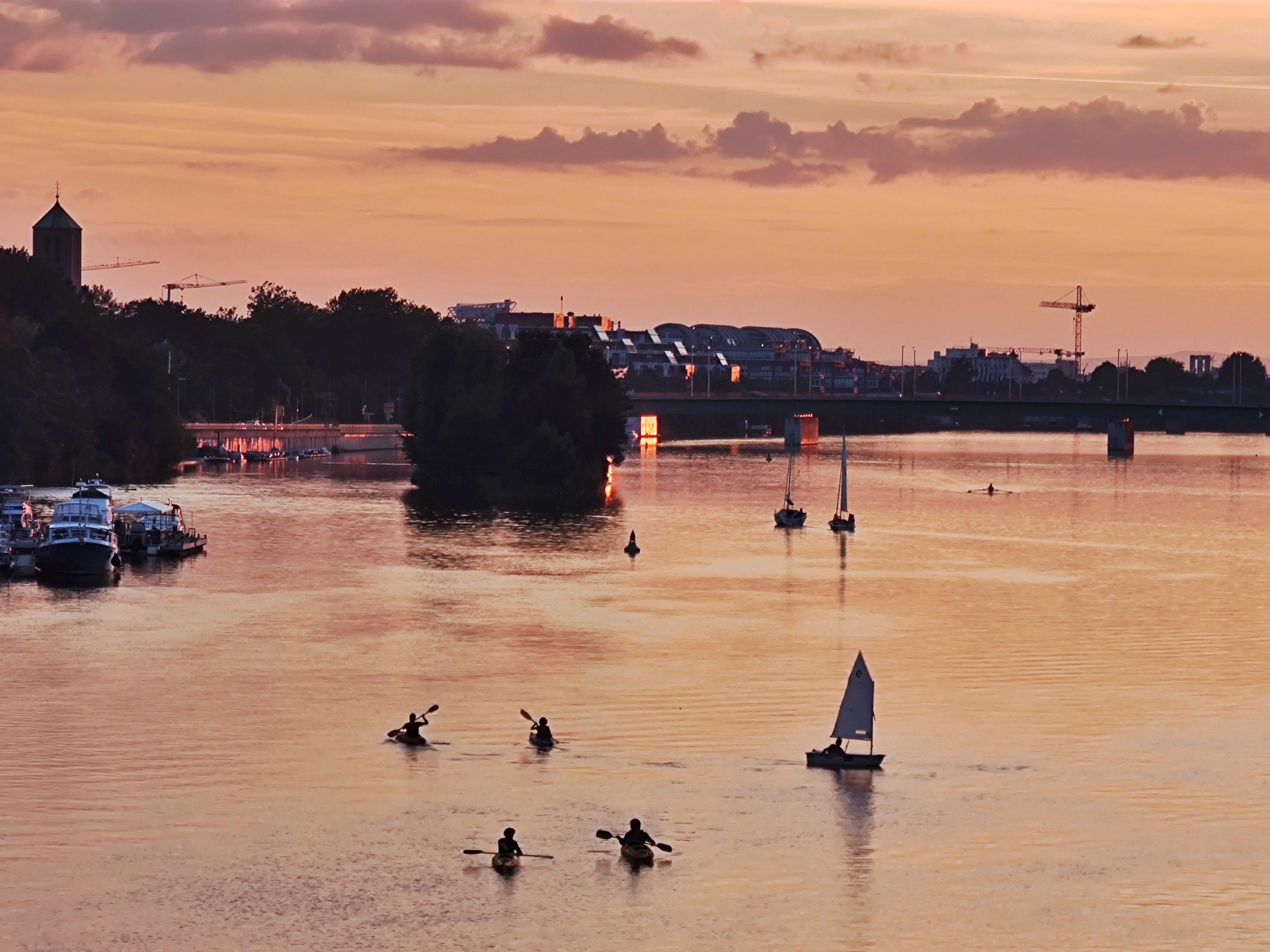
Kayaking, sailing and rowing near the Neckarinsel at sunset

Heidelberg is one of the centres of Rugby union in Germany, along with Hanover. In 2008–09, four out of nine clubs in the Rugby-Bundesliga were from Heidelberg, these being RG Heidelberg, who play at the Fritz-Grunebaum-Sportpark, SC Neuenheim, Heidelberger RK, and TSV Handschuhsheim. Heidelberger TV has a rugby department.

Rugby League Deutschland has two teams based in Heidelberg, Heidelberg Sharks formed in 2005 and Rohrbach Hornets formed in 2007.

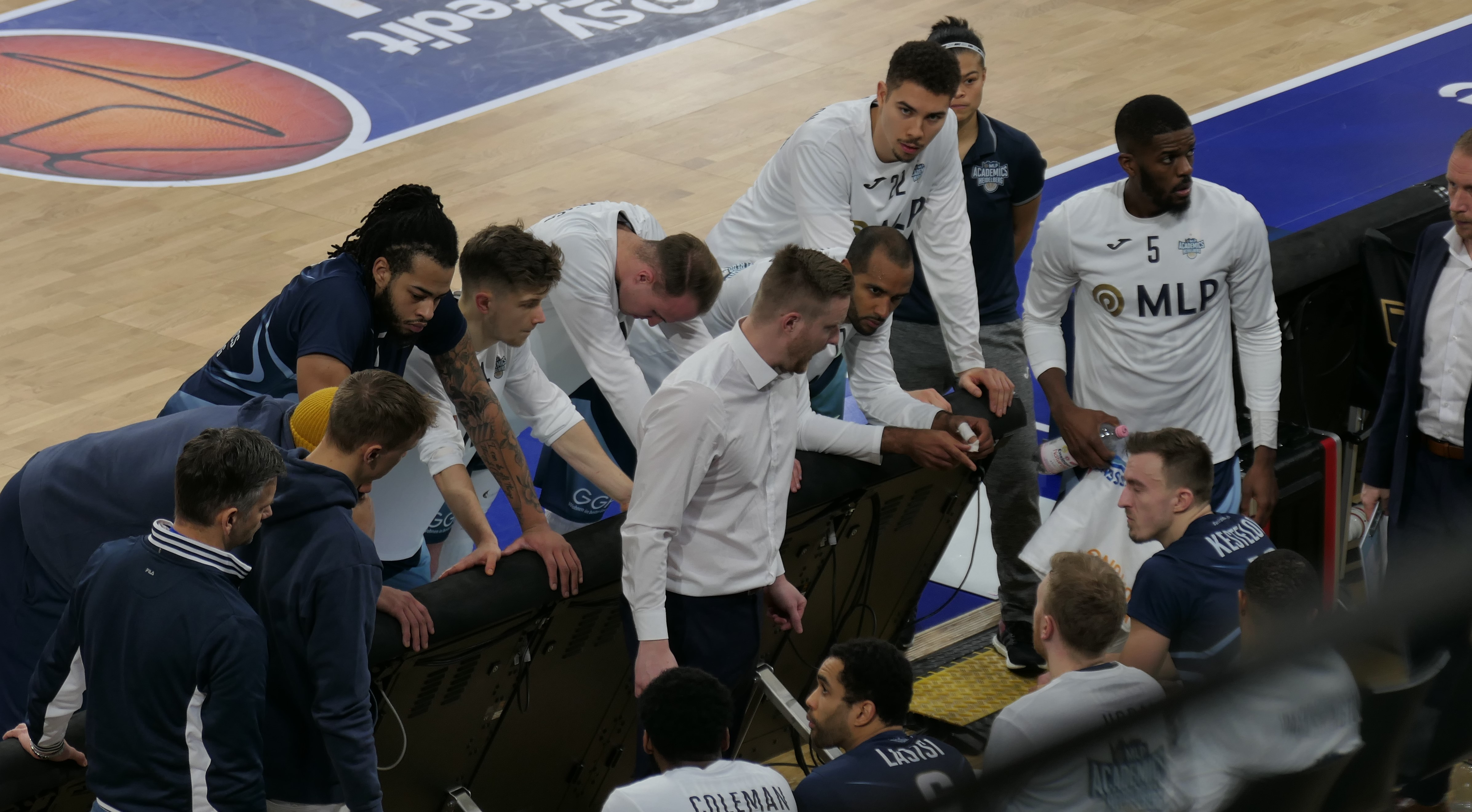
Academics Heidelberg huddle in January 2023.

The city is also home to the USC Heidelberg (Academics Heidelberg), which won 9 German Basketball Championships and remains the second most successful team in the history of German professional basketball. Today, the club plays in Germany's second division ProA. It is primarily known for its youth department which developed several members of Germany's senior national basketball team.

Heidelberger SC and SG Heidelberg-Kirchheim are local football teams.

The city hosted events during the 1972 Summer Paralympics.

They also hosted the 2019 WU24 Championships from 13 to 20 July. It was the fifth edition of this world championship and marked the third time Germany has hosted an ultimate frisbee tournament.

Germany's oldest tennis club, which was founded in 1890, is located in Heidelberg.

== Twin towns – sister cities ==
Heidelberg is twinned with:

- Montpellier, France (1961)
- Cambridge, United Kingdom (1965)
- Rehovot, Israel (1983)
- Bautzen, Germany (1991)
- Simferopol, Ukraine (1991)
- Kumamoto, Japan (1992)
- Palo Alto, United States (2017)
- Hangzhou, China (2017)

=== Friendly cities ===
Heidelberg also has friendly relations with:

- Calamba, Philippines
- Heidelberg, South Africa
- Jelenia Góra, Poland
- Mostar, Bosnia and Herzegovina

== In popular culture ==
=== Manga and anime ===
- Heidelberg serves as a setting in Naoki Urasawa’s manga series Monster and its anime adaptation, in which Nina Fortner studies law at Heidelberg University.

=== Movies, TV and games ===
- Heidelberg features in the 1968 film The Girl on a Motorcycle, the university being the ultimate destination of Marianne Faithfull's character.
- Heidelberg also features during a mission in the Electronic Arts strategy game Red Alert 3.
- Morris from America takes place in Heidelberg.
- In the sitcom The Big Bang Theory, Sheldon Cooper said he went to Heidelberg University as a visiting professor when he was a teenager. This is confirmed in the spin-off series Young Sheldon, where several episodes in Season 7 take place there.

=== Literature ===
- Heidelberg Castle forms the setting for the beginning of Mark Twain's story The Awful German Language.
- Most of David Lodge's novel Out of the Shelter takes place in Heidelberg in 1951 during the American occupation after World War II.
- Heidelberg is the home of a professional Quidditch team operating within the fictional Harry Potter universe: the Heidelberg Harriers have been described as "fiercer than a dragon and twice as clever".
- Band of Brothers — Stephen E. Ambrose’s Band of Brothers recounts Easy Company’s passage through Heidelberg; Ambrose records David K. Webster’s admiration for the city, describing its intact buildings, river promenade and collegiate atmosphere and calling Heidelberg, in effect, “paradise.”

== Notable people ==
=== Public service and business ===
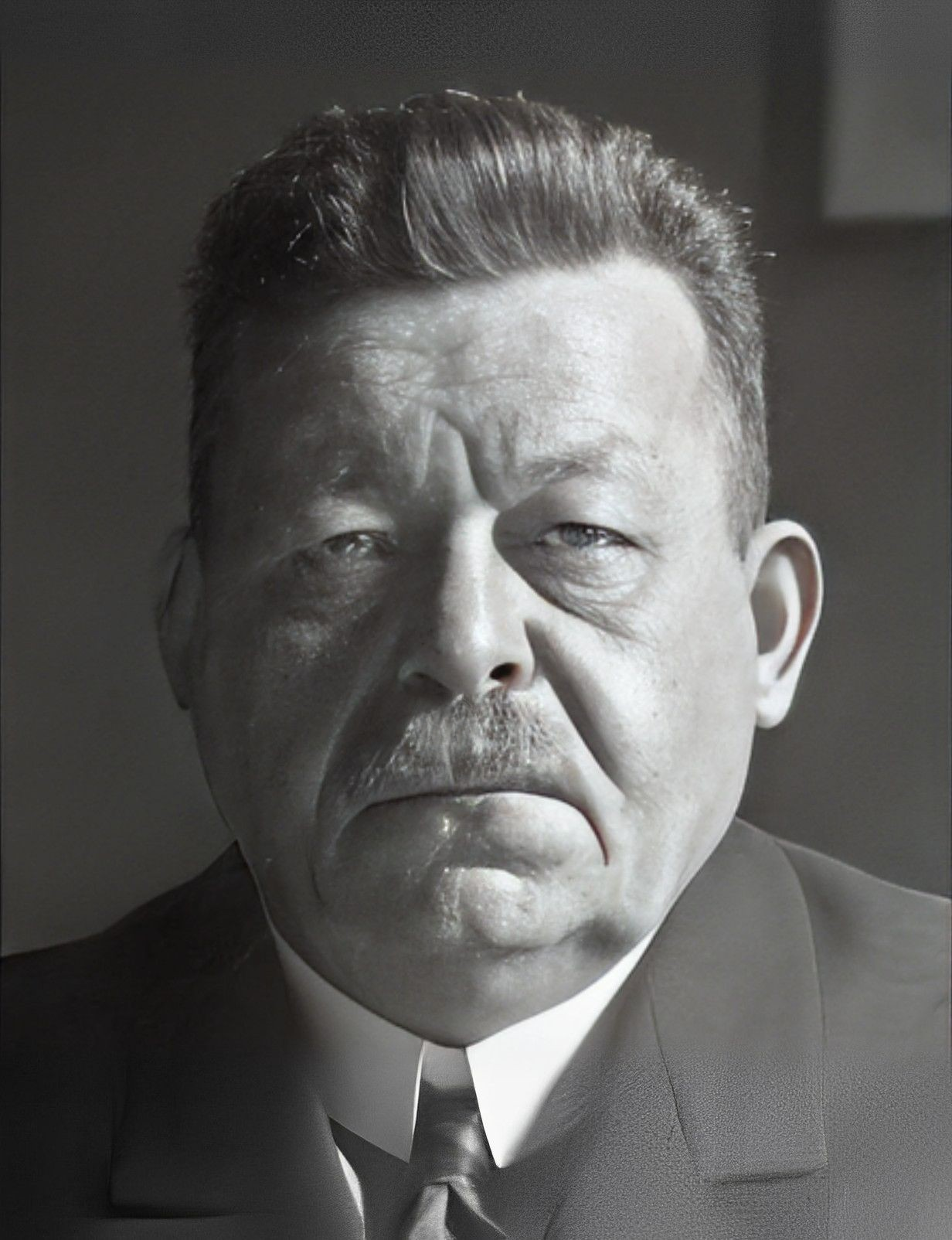
Friedrich Ebert, first president of Germany, 1925

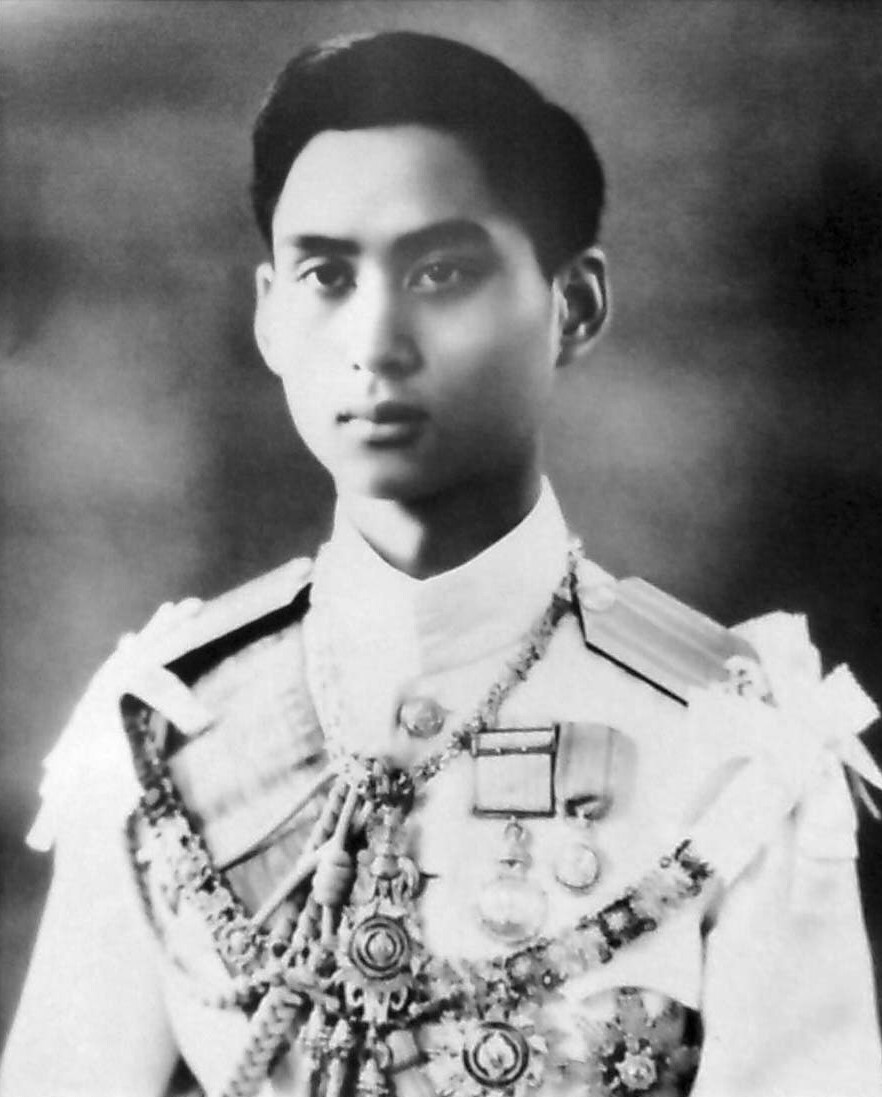
Ananda Mahidol, 1946

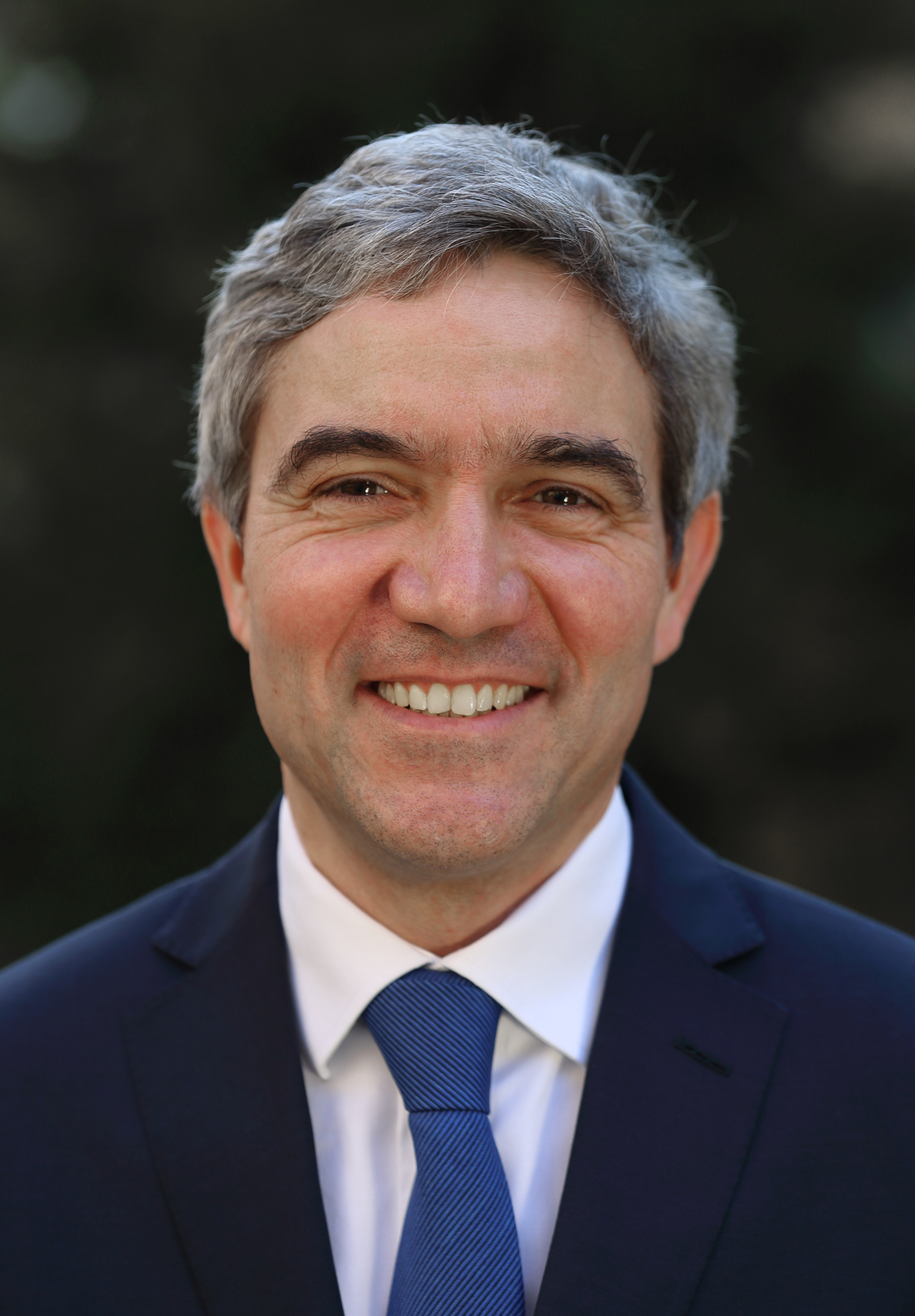
Stephan Harbarth, 2017

- Franciscus Junius (1591–1677), pioneer of Germanic philology
- Frederick Schomberg, 1st Duke of Schomberg (1615–1690), army officer, died at the Battle of the Boyne
- Karl Philipp von Wrede (1767–1838), Bavarian field marshal
- Nicholas Trübner (1817–1884), German-English publisher, bookseller and linguist
- José Rizal (1861–1896), national hero of the Philippines; attended local medical lectures in 1880s
- Friedrich Ebert (1871–1925), president of Germany 1919–1925
- Marie Bernays (1883–1939), politician, educator, writer and women's rights activist; lived and studied locally
- Charles A. Willoughby (1892–1972), major general in the U.S. Army
- Hans-Georg Gadamer (1900–2002), Heidelberg University philosophy chair 1949–1968
- Hermann Röhn (1902–1946), Nazi Party official and convicted war criminal
- Albert Speer (1905–1981), German architect and Third Reich minister, lived locally in his youth
- Hans Kroh (1907–1967), German officer in Wehrmacht and Bundeswehr
- Ferdinand Thomas (DE Wiki) (1913–1944), resistance fighter
- Ananda Mahidol (1925–1946), king of Thailand 1935–1946, born locally
- Klaus Schütz (1926–2012), politician (SPD); mayor of West Berlin 1967–1977
- Ernst Albrecht (1930–2014), politician (CDU), minister-president of Lower Saxony, father of Ursula von der Leyen
- Heinz-Georg Baus (1934–2016), billionaire businessman, owned Bauhaus AG
- Hubert Burda (born 1940), billionaire publisher, owns Hubert Burda Media
- Hans-Peter Wild (born 1941), Swiss businessman and lawyer, owns Capri-Sun
- Paul Kirchhof (born 1943), former justice of the Federal Constitutional Court, then local law professor
- Romani Rose (born 1946), Romany activist and head of the Central Council of German Sinti and Roma
- Bernd Schmitt (born 1957), marketing professor at Columbia University
- Marc S. Ellenbogen (born 1963), entrepreneur and philanthropist, nominated by Barack Obama to be U.S. ambassador
- Oliver Zipse (born 1964), business executive, CEO of BMW since 2019
- Theresia Bauer (born 1965), politician (Green), local member of the Landtag of Baden-Württemberg
- Becca Balint (born 1968), U.S. representative for Vermont
- Jan Hatzius (born 1968), chief economist at Goldman Sachs since 2011
- Christoph Ahlhaus (born 1969), politician (CDU), mayor of Hamburg 2010/2011
- Albrecht Schütte (born 1970), politician (CDU)
- Stephan Harbarth (born 1971), president of the Federal Constitutional Court, former lawyer and CDU politician
- Emily Perez (1983–2006), 2nd lieutenant in the US Army, first female graduate of West Point to die in Iraq
- Moritz Oppelt (born 1989), politician (CDU)

=== Arts ===
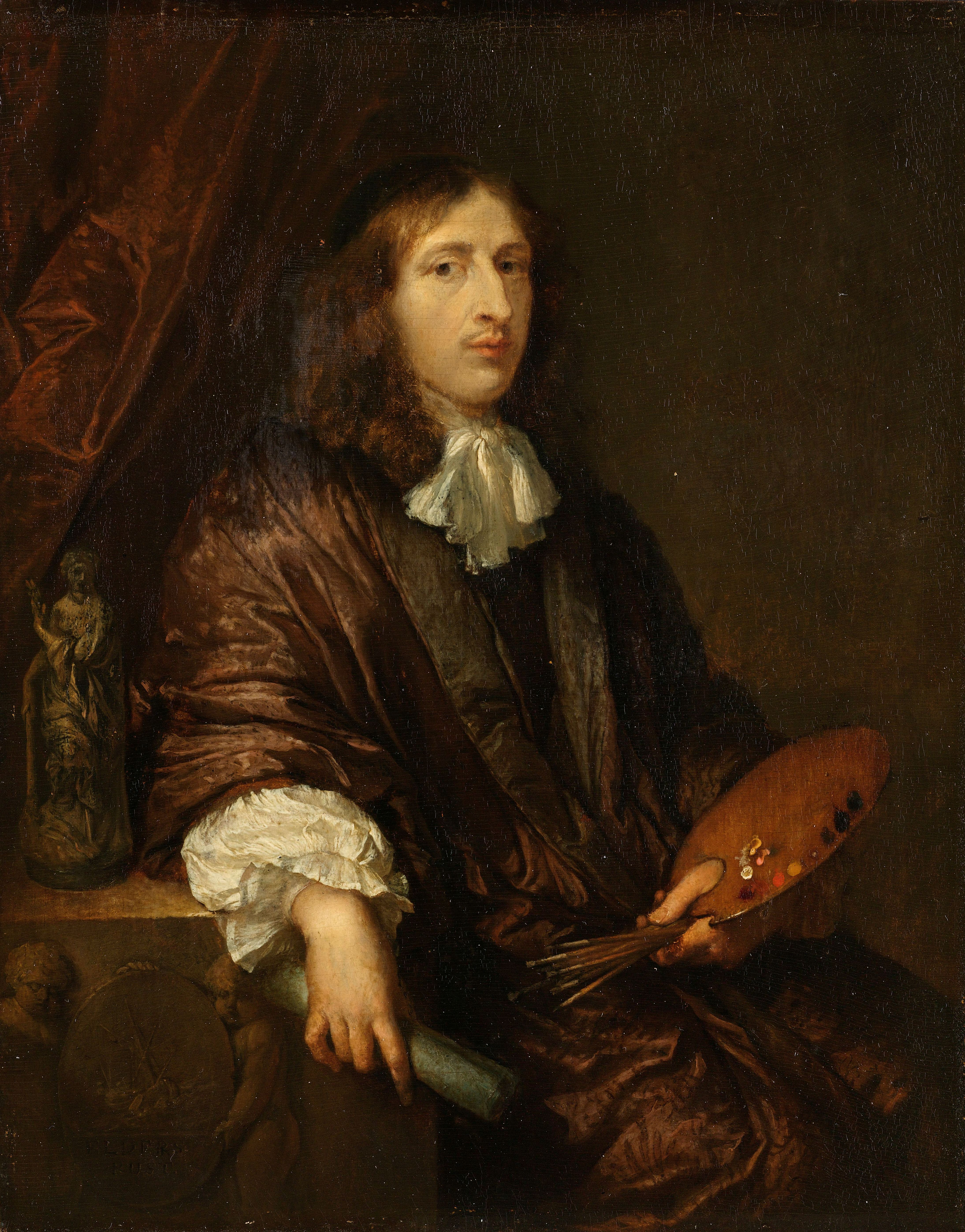
Caspar Netscher, self portrait

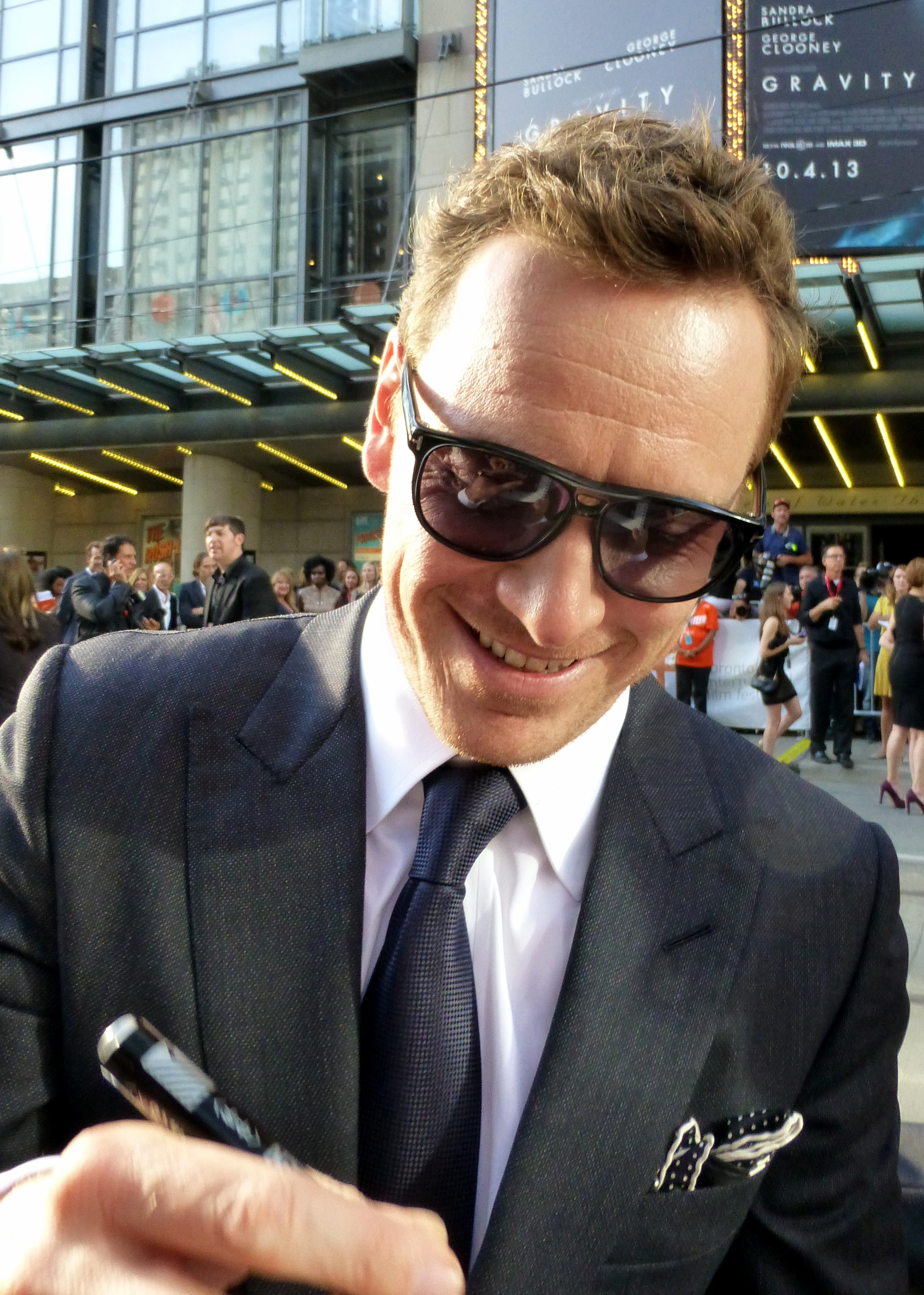
Michael Fassbender, 2013

- Caspar Netscher (1639–1684), Dutch portrait and genre painter
- Joseph Görres (1776–1848), writer, philosopher, theologian, historian and local University lecturer
- brothers Karl Philipp Fohr (1795–1818) & Daniel Fohr (1801–1862), painters
- Carl Rottmann (1797–1850), landscape painter
- Charles Beck (1798–1866), American classical scholar
- Ernst Fries (1801–1833), painter, worked on a transition from Romanticism to Realism
- Jakob Götzenberger (1802–1866), mural painter and portraitist
- Caroline Bauer (1807–1877), actress of the Biedermeier era
- Ernst Jünger (1895–1998), German author, officer, botanist and entomologist, wrote Storm of Steel
- Muhammad Iqbal (1877–1938), South Asian poet and philosopher; studied locally
- Marie Marcks (1922–2014), graphic artist and cartoonist; the "grande dame of political caricature"
- Viola Farber (1931–1998), American choreographer and dancer
- Christoph Luitpold Frommel (1933-2026), German art historian
- Michael Hampe (1935–2022), theatre and opera director
- Bernhard Schlink (born 1944), lawyer, academic and novelist; wrote The Reader
- Jackson Browne (born 1948), singer-songwriter and musician
- Nico Hofmann, (DE Wiki) (born 1959), film director, film producer, screenwriter and businessman
- Arvid Boecker (born 1964), painter and curator, lives and works locally
- Bettina Belitz (born 1973), writer and journalist
- Ellen Ehni (born 1973), journalist and TV editor
- Sanna Englund (born 1975), actress
- Michael Fassbender (born 1977), German-Irish actor
- Paul Ripke (born 1981), fashion and sports photographer and music video director
- Marcel Cartier (born 1984), hip-hop artist, journalist, filmmaker, writer and political commentator

=== Science ===
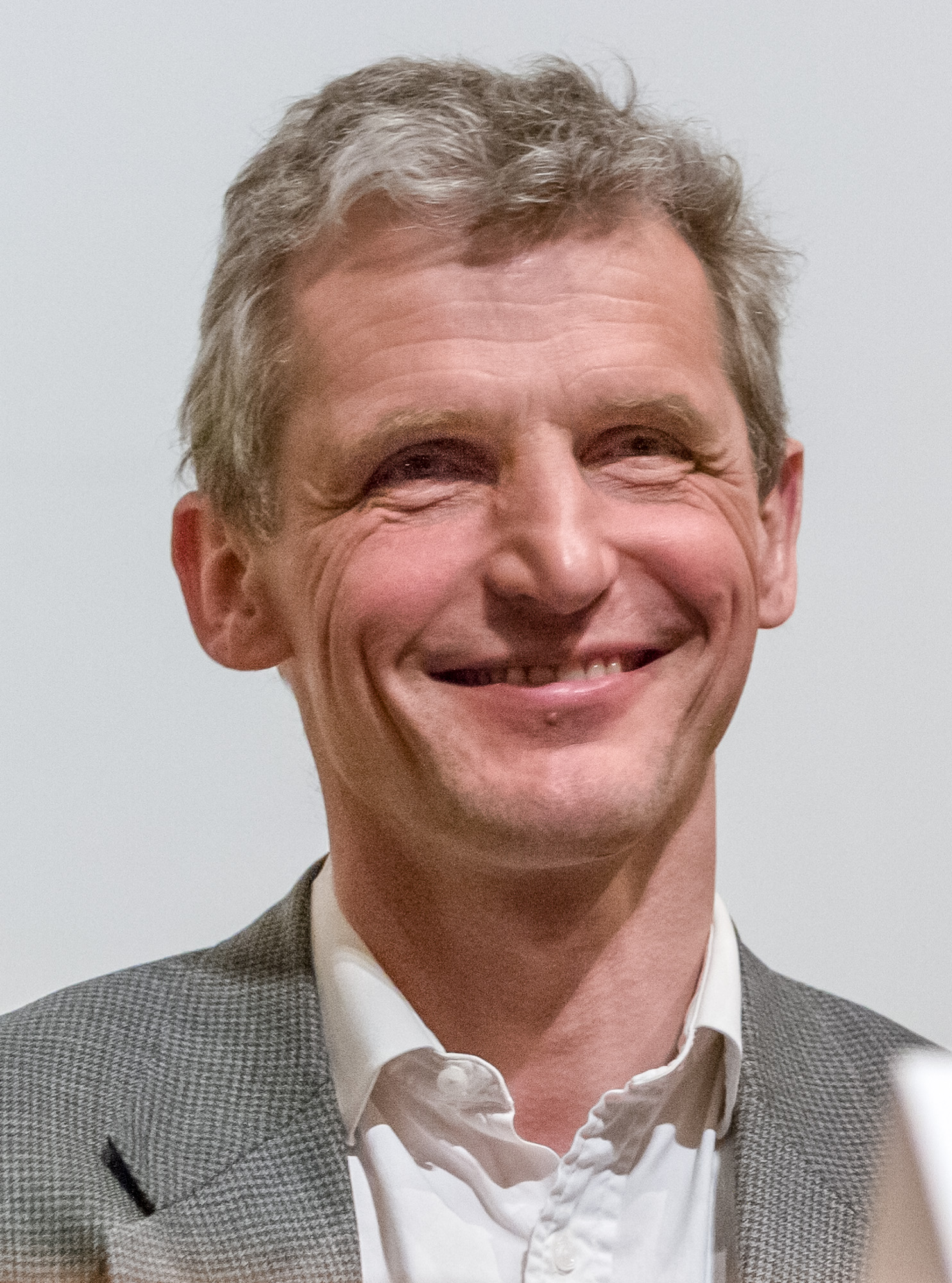
Wolfgang Ketterle, 2007

- Heinrich Georg Bronn (1800–1862), geologist and paleontologist
- Robert Bunsen (1811–1899), German chemist, developed the Bunsen burner; died locally
- Emil Bessels (1847–1888), zoologist, entomologist, physician, and Arctic researcher
- Carl Bosch (1874–1940), chemist and engineer, awarded Nobel Prize in Chemistry in 1931
- Karl Wilhelm Reinmuth (1892–1979), astronomer and a prolific discoverer of 395 minor planets
- Ernst Ruska (1906–1988), physicist who won the Nobel Prize in Physics in 1986, worked on electron optics
- Harald zur Hausen (1936–2023), virologist, awarded Nobel Prize in Physiology or Medicine in 2008, died locally
- Theodor W. Hänsch (born 1941), physicist, won one-fourth of the 2005 Nobel Prize in Physics for spectroscopy
- Wolfgang Ketterle (born 1957), physicist, professor at MIT, awarded Nobel Prize in Physics in 2001

=== Sport ===
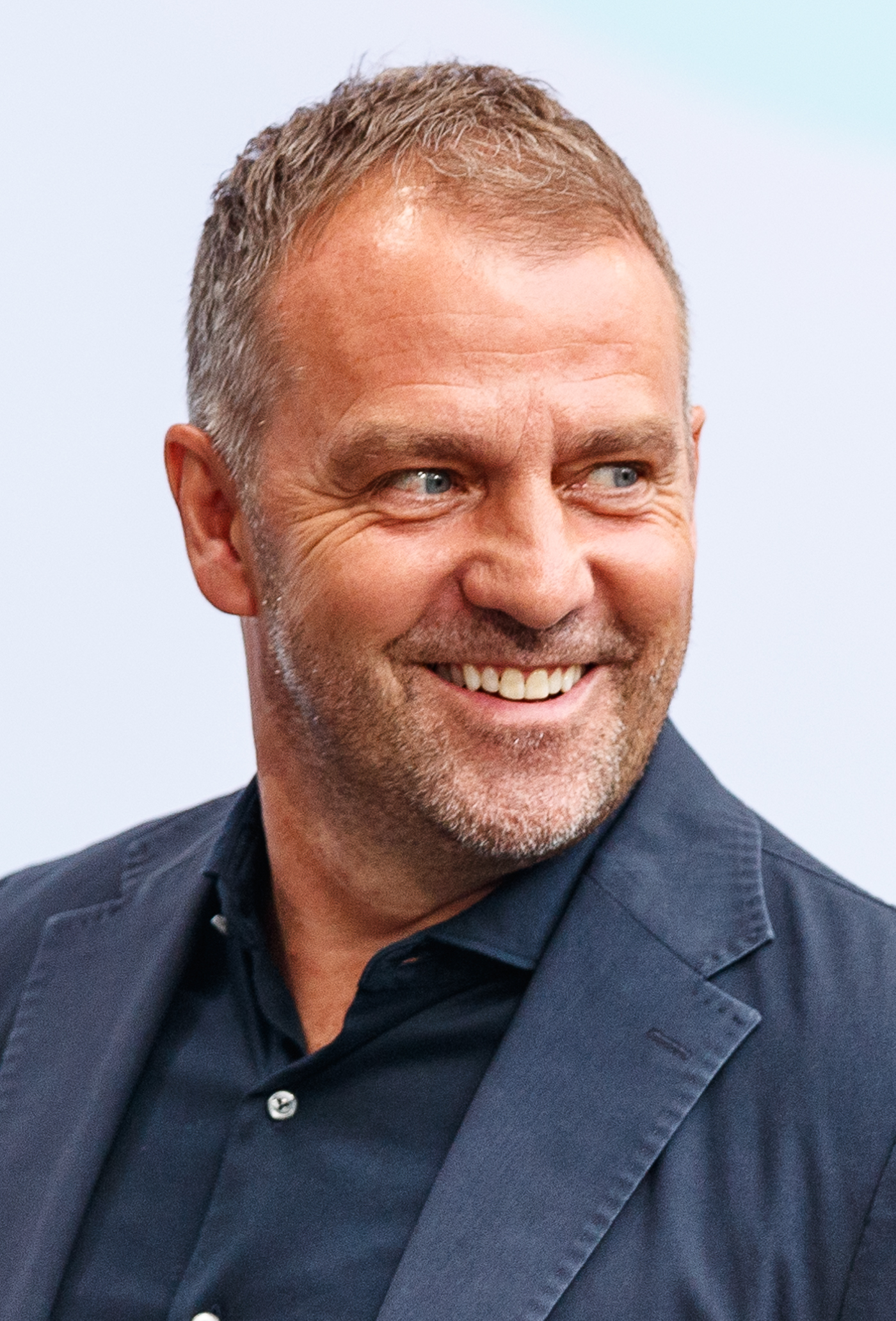
Hansi Flick, 2022

- Helene Mayer (1910–1953), German and American fencer, gold medallist at the 1928 Summer Olympics, died locally
- Dieter Freise (1945–2018), field hockey player, team gold medallist at the 1972 Summer Olympics
- Günter Haritz (born 1948), retired road and track cyclist, Team Pursuit gold medallist at the 1972 Summer Olympics
- Michael Peter (1949–1997), field hockey player, team captain gold medallist at the 1972 Summer Olympics
- Volker Weidler (born 1962), retired racing driver, won the 24 Hours of Le Mans in 1991
- Hansi Flick (born 1965), football player and manager of the FC Barcelona football team
- Nelson Piquet Jr. (born 1985), Brazilian former Formula One racing driver, son of Nelson Piquet (born 1952)
- Kehoma Brenner (born 1986), rugby union player, played 46 games for Germany national rugby union team
- Juan José Chang (born 1987), football manager of the Samoa women's national football team
- Ashley Wagner (born 1991), American figure skater, bronze medallist at 2014 Winter Olympics
- Jonas Hofmann (born 1992), footballer, played over 330 games and 23 for Germany
- Elisabeth Seitz (born 1993), Olympic artistic gymnast
- Malaika Mihambo (born 1994), long jumper, gold medallist at the 2020 Summer Olympics and world champion in 2019 and 2022

=== Aristocracy ===
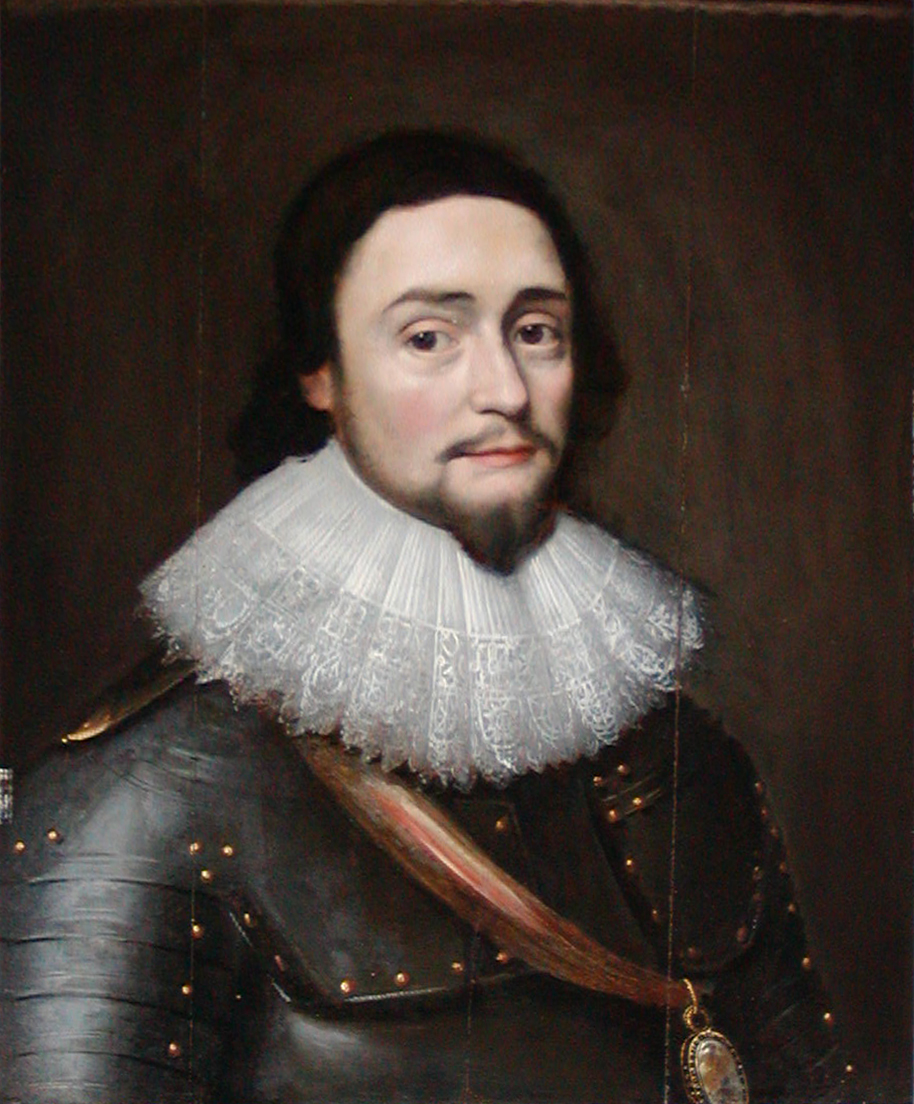
Frederick V; Elector Palatine, King of Bohemia

- Louis I, Count of Löwenstein (1463–1523), founded the House of Lowenstein-Wertheim
- Frederick V (1596–1632), Count Palatine and elector of the Palatinate 1610–1623 and king of Bohemia (as "Frederick I"); fought the Siege of Heidelberg in 1622
- Silvia Renate Sommerlath (born 1943), queen of Sweden

== See also ==
- Heidelberg Center for American Studies
- Heidelberg University
- Schiller International University
