= James Brau =

James Brau may refer to:

- James C. Brau (born 1969), American economist
- James E. Brau (born 1946), American physicist
