= Lukáš Vondráček =

Czech pianist (born 1986)

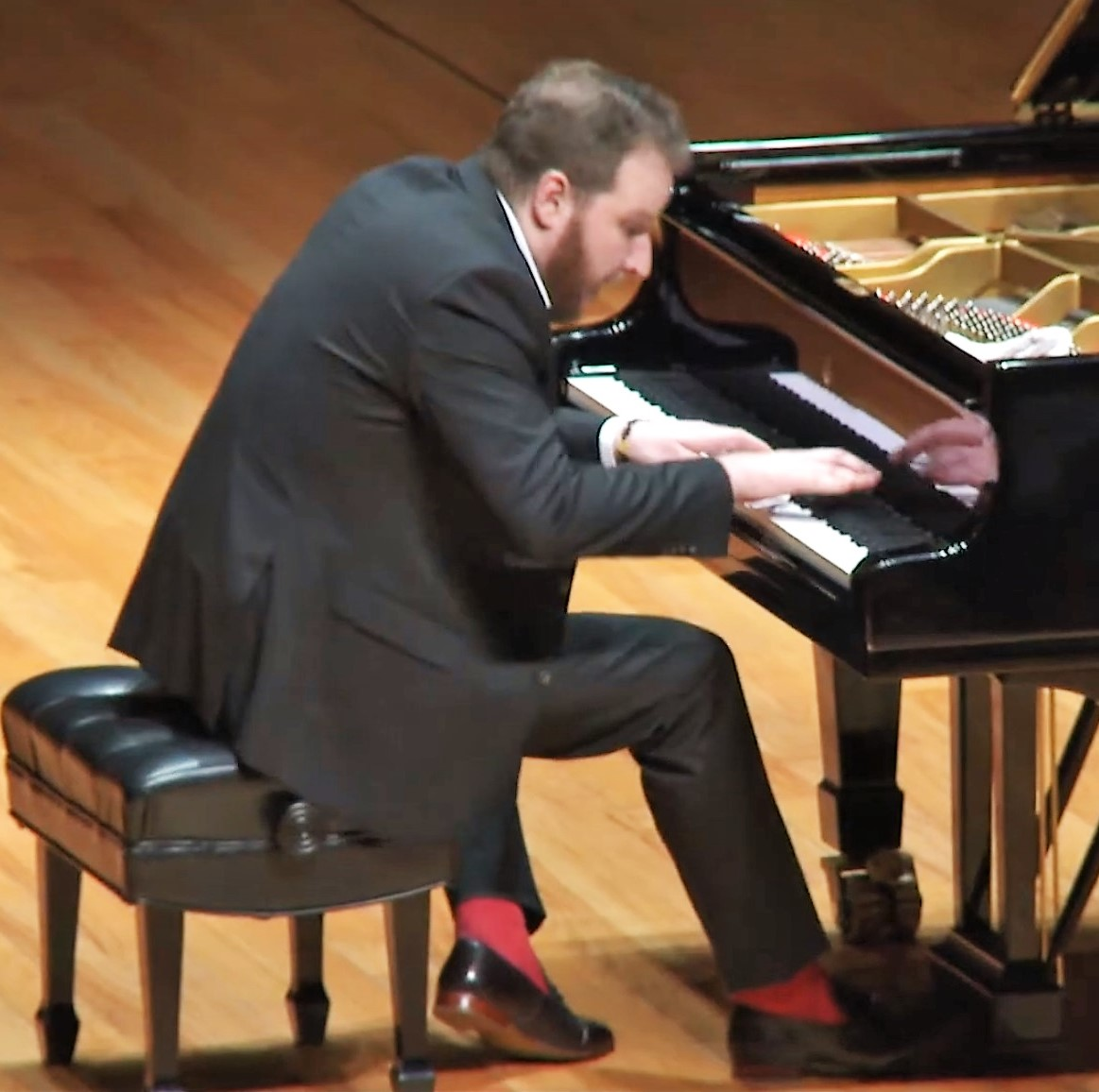
- Vondráček playing in the Sala Nezahualcóyotl, Mexico City, in 2017
- Born: 21 October 1986 (age 39); Opava, Czechoslovakia
- Education: Karol Szymanowski Academy of Music; University of Music and Performing Arts Vienna; University of Ostrava New England Conservatory of Music
- Occupation: Classical pianist
- Awards: Queen Elisabeth Competition

Lukáš Vondráček (born 21 October 1986) is a Czech pianist. Vondráček won the first prize in the Queen Elisabeth Competition in 2016, the first Czech musician to do so. He has performed with many of the world's major orchestras, including the Chicago Symphony Orchestra, London Symphony Orchestra, NHK Symphony Orchestra, Prague Symphony Orchestra and the Frankfurt Radio Symphony. Vondráček's recordings include a cycle of Sergei Rachmaninoff's four piano concertos and Rhapsody on a Theme of Paganini with the Prague Symphony Orchestra on the Supraphon label and an earlier recording of Rachmaninoff's Piano Concerto No. 1 with Vladimir Ashkenazy conducting the Czech Philharmonic.

== Early life and education ==
Vondráček was born on 21 October 1986 in Opava, to professional pianist parents. He played his debut concert at the age of four, and gave his first international tour at ten years old. He studied at the Karol Szymanowski Academy of Music with Andrzej Jasiński, University of Music and Performing Arts Vienna with Peter Barcaba, University of Ostrava with Rudolf Bernatik, and at the New England Conservatory of Music with Hung-Kuan Chen, where he earned an Artist Diploma with Honors.

== Career ==
Vondráček has performed as soloist with the Chicago Symphony Orchestra, London Symphony Orchestra, BBC Philharmonic, Frankfurt Radio Symphony, Deutsches Symphonie-Orchester Berlin, Saint Petersburg Philharmonic Orchestra, Orchestre national de Lille, Warsaw National Philharmonic Orchestra, Prague Symphony Orchestra, Toronto Symphony Orchestra, NHK Symphony Orchestra, and Tokyo Metropolitan Symphony Orchestra, working with conductors such as Vladimir Ashkenazy, Paavo Järvi, Michael Tilson Thomas, Yannick Nézet-Séguin, Gianandrea Noseda, Christoph Eschenbach, Marin Alsop, Vasily Petrenko, and Jakub Hrůša.

In 2000, Vondracek, then thirteen, was the Secondary/Financial Recipient of the inaugural Hanno R. Ellenbogen Citizenship Award. The Award was presented jointly to Vladimir Ashkenazy, Ken'ichiro Kobayashi, Sir Charles Mackerras and Vladimir Valek by the Prague Society for International Cooperation and Global Panel Foundation.

In 2002, at the age of fifteen, Vondráček debuted with the Czech Philharmonic conducted by Vladimir Ashkenazy. Ashkenazy has said of Vondráček: "Such a pianist is born once in thirty years." This debut was followed by a major US tour in 2003. Reviewing a concert at Chicago's Symphony Center (the closing concert of the tour), Vondráček's performance of Prokofiev's Piano Concerto No. 1 was described by John von Rhein of the Chicago Tribune as "the hit of the evening".

In 2009, Vondráček was the recipient of The Raymond E. Buck Jury Discretionary Award at the 2009 Van Cliburn International Piano Competition. The following year, in 2010, he won the Hilton Head International Piano Competition.

In 2016, Vondráček won the Queen Elisabeth Competition, becoming the first Czech musician to do so. His performance in the final round, which included Claude Ledoux's A Butterfly's Dream and Sergei Rachmaninoff's Piano Concerto No. 3, led to a standing ovation.

Vondráček has continued to achieve considerable critical acclaim for his performances. Writing in The Boston Globe, Jeremy Eichler wrote about Vondráček's 2022 debut with the Boston Symphony Orchestra under Jakub Hrůša in Rachmaninoff's Piano Concerto No. 2: "his playing stood out most in its glittering, featherweight passagework and in its overall command of the work's dark, rhetorical drama." The same year, his return appearance with the Chicago Symphony Orchestra under Marin Alsop was hailed by WTTW as a "galvanic performance", adding: "Vondráček ... rendered the extraordinary work with a superb mix of both titanic power and surprising lyricism."

Vondráček's discography includes releases for such labels as Supraphon, Two Pianists, Triton, and Musicom (where he recorded Rachmaninoff's Piano Concerto No. 1 with the Czech Philharmonic Orchestra conducted by Vladimir Ashkenazy). For Supraphon he recorded all of the Rachmaninoff piano concertos and Rhapsody on a Theme of Paganini with the Prague Symphony Orchestra conducted by Tomáš Brauner.

== Personal life ==
Vondráček and his wife live in Las Vegas.
