= Marc S. Ellenbogen =

American diplomat and businessman

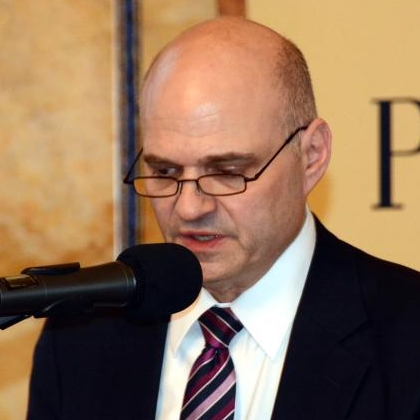
- Born: 6 February 1963 (age 63); Heidelberg, Germany (Federal Republic of Germany)
- Education: Syracuse (Maxwell School); Oxford (Magdalen College)
- Occupation: Diplomat

Marc S. Ellenbogen (born 6 February 1963 in Heidelberg) is an entrepreneur, philanthropist and a diplomat. He is Chairman of the Global Panel Foundation and president of the Prague Society for International Cooperation.

Ellenbogen's main pursuit is to fight against corruption in Central and Eastern Europe. He has been active in seeking justice against former Communist officials and members of the Communist-era secret police (Avo (HU), KGB (Soviet Union), Securitate (RO), Stasi (DDR), StB (CSSR), SB Security Service (Poland) inter alia. He has sought to honor those who stood up against communism in Central and Eastern Europe, such as Jan Zajíc and Václav Havel. Besides his work in Central and Eastern Europe, Ellenbogen also rescued the daughter of former Rwandan Foreign Minister (1979-1989) François Ngarukiyintwali to Canada after the revolution.

== Early life and education ==
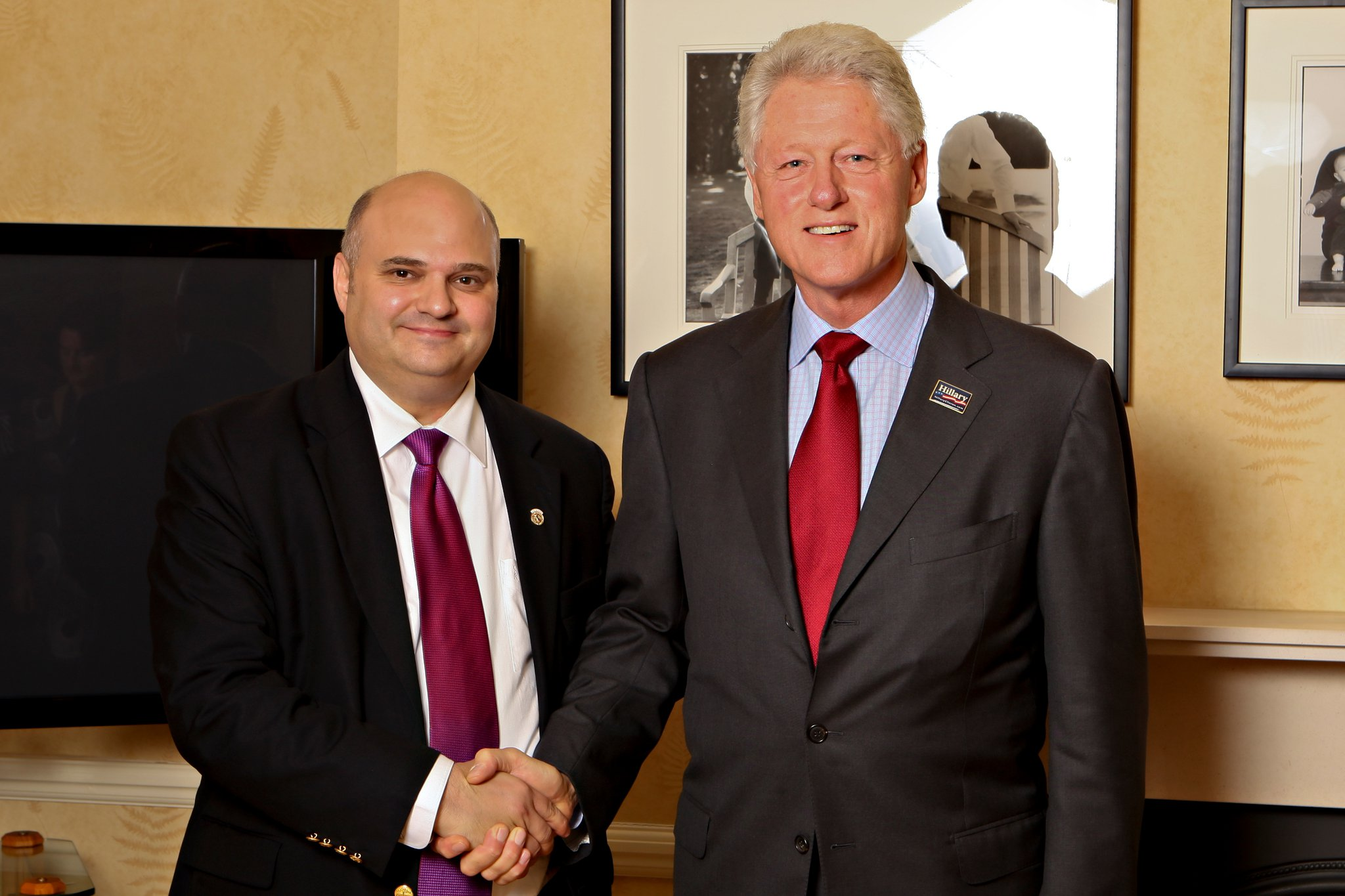
Marc Ellenbogen and Bill Clinton

Ellenbogen's father, Paul Ellenbogen, was, amongst other things, serving as a Navy officer in war crimes trials in Japan. The Prague Society's Hanno R. Ellenbogen Citizenship Award is named after the mother of Ellenbogen. The ancestors of Ellenbogen originated from the German noble family von Katzen-Ellenbogen (see County of Katzenelnbogen, Katzenelnbogen, Rheinfels Castle).

He attended Heidelberg American High School, played Varsity soccer, ran Varsity cross-country and was elected student-body vice-president, then president. During university he was at the Maxwell School of Citizenship and Public Affairs at Syracuse University, both as an undergraduate and graduate student. There, Ellenbogen served as student government comptroller and speaker, as student representative to the Board of Trustees and as president of Lambda Chi Alpha fraternity. Later he was at Magdalen College at the University of Oxford.

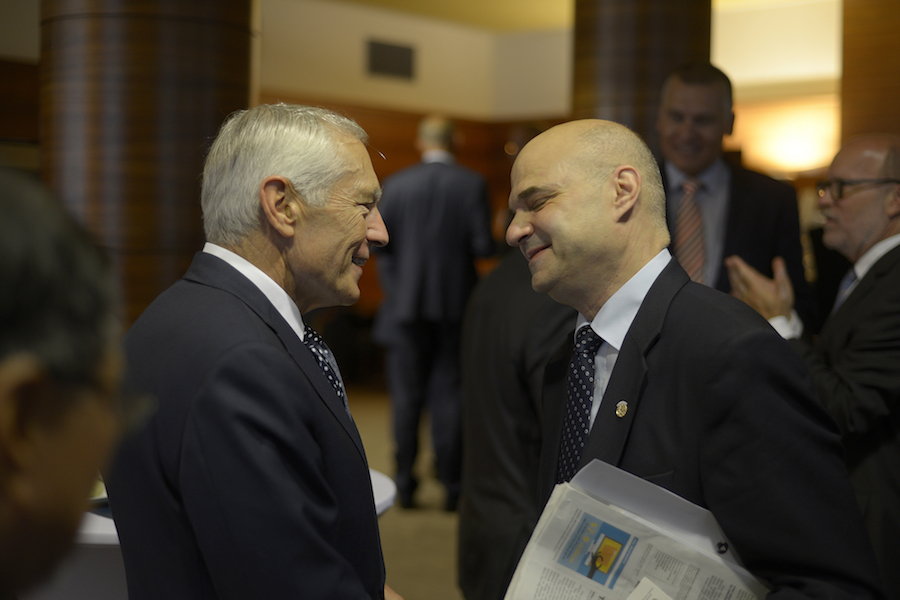
Marc Ellenbogen and Wesley Clark

== Career ==
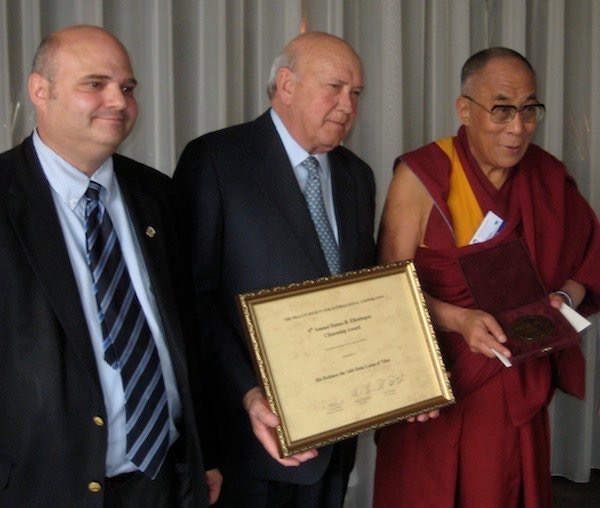
Marc Ellenbogen, F. W. de Klerk with the Dalai Lama in Prague

He is the chairman of the Global Panel Foundation and Prague Society for International Cooperation. Annually, he hosts the Hanno R. Ellenbogen Citizenship Award.

He was an internationally syndicated columnist for United Press International (2004-2010), with over 300 columns appearing in publications, including The Washington Times, The Globe and Mail, The Financial Times, and Die Welt. The op-eds were published under the title Atlantic Eye and dealt with political issues and Marc Ellenbogen's own experience with diplomacy across the Atlantic. Ellenbogen's column Atlantic Eye has been cited in numerous media, print and other mediums.

From 2004 to 2010, Ellenbogen served on the National Advisory Board of the US Democratic Party. He is a former Vice Chair & Founding Trustee of the Democratic Expat Leadership Council. In 2009, U.S. President Barack Obama nominated Ellenbogen to be Ambassador to Bulgaria.

He is a Life Member of the Association of the United States Army and a Member of the Navy League of the United States. He is also a member of the board of directors of the CERGE-EI Foundation (New York, USA), a Senior Associate at the Moynihan Institute of Global Affairs, Maxwell School of Citizenship and Public Affairs (Syracuse, USA), and an Associate Fellow and Professor at the International Institute for Advanced Studies in Systems Research and Cybernetics (Windsor, Canada).

He serves as an adviser to, and Honorary Member of, the Oxford University European Affairs Society. He is a Patron of the right-of-center Henry Jackson Society and a member of the Corps Rheno-Nicaria zu Mannheim und Heidelberg. He is a Member of the Editorial Board of The Journal of Entrepreneurial Finance.

== See also ==
- Hanno R. Ellenbogen Citizenship Award
