= Prague Society for International Cooperation =

Czech non-governmental organization

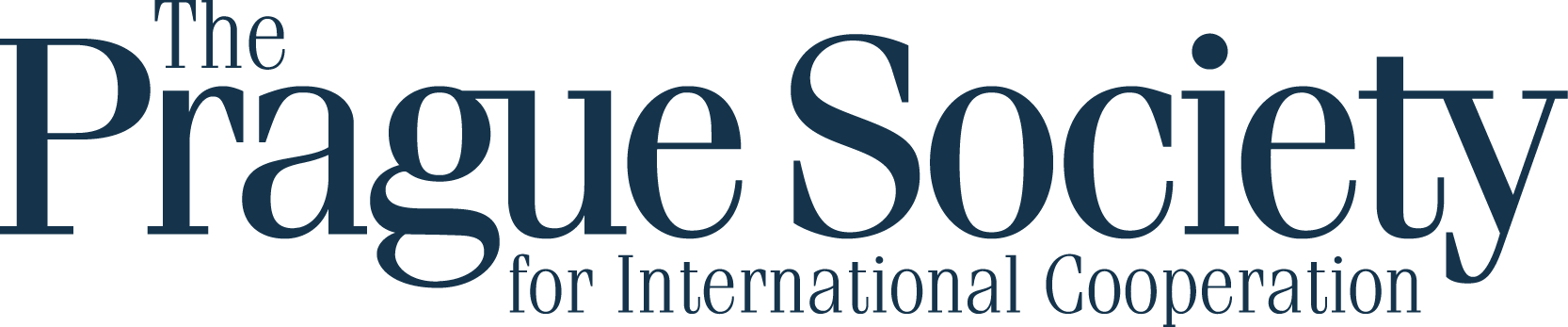
The Prague Society logo

The Prague Society for International Cooperation is a Prague-based non-governmental organization that originated in Communist Central Europe, when political dissidents joined forces to oppose their respective regimes. Several of its members were imprisoned during the communist era and the Prague Society officially became a registered NGO in 1997 under President Václav Havel.

A principal aim of the Society is to fight against corruption and abuse within Central and Eastern Europe. It brings people together to share knowledge and experiences, and develop a new generation of responsible, well-informed leaders and thinkers. It promotes a global approach to business, politics, and academia through transparent networking and off the record dialogue.

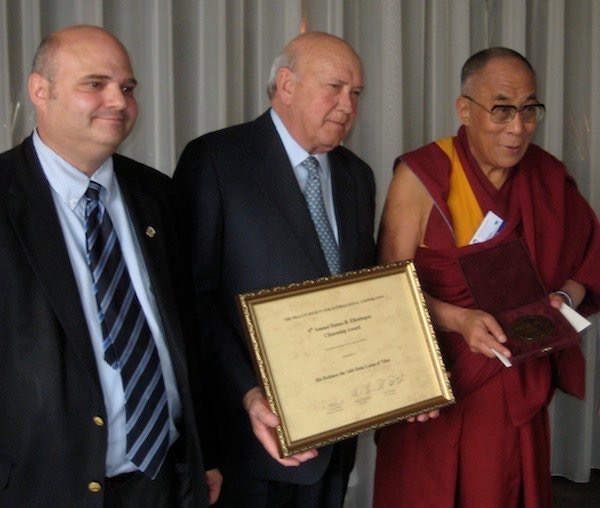
The 14th Dalai Lama receiving the Hanno R. Ellenbogen Award from Honorary President F.W. De Klerk and President Marc Ellenbogen.

The Prague Society works in conjunction with the Global Panel Foundation with which it hosts the Hanno R. Ellenbogen Citizenship Award given annually since the year 2000. The Award honours dedication to - and achievement in - public service particularly in Central Europe. Its respected unorthodox methods have attracted and retained many international ties world-wide. In addition to its international endeavours, the Prague Society also publishes a newsletter that is distributed to the local population in the Czech Republic and other international publications.

== Past events ==
- 10 September 2020: Public Policy Dinner at the Residence of Royal Thai Embassy - discussions touching on foreign relations of the Czech Republic.
- 30 March 2019: the Prague Society and Global Panel Foundation hosted an event allowing students form UNYP to discuss and comment on the European Elections with the cooperation of the Embassy of Greece in Prague.
- 7 June 2017: The Prague Society organised a Public Policy Discussion hosted by H.E. Dr. Alberts Sarkanis at the Latvian Embassy.
- 28 January 2013: Global Panel and Prague Society support call for the impeachment of the President of the Czech Republic, Václav Klaus.
- 12 January 2013: Prague Society honors the passing of Yuri M. Schmidt.
- 12 October 2012: Prague Society honors the passing of Geraldine Mucha.
- 23 August 2011: Prague Society honors the passing of Jack Layton.
- 5 March 2011: Prague Society honors the passing of Jan Zajíc in Vítkov.
- 25 January 2011: Prague Society presents the Hanno R. Ellenbogen Citizenship Award to the Polish journalist and former dissident Adam Michnik.
- 23 June 2010: Radio Free Europe/Radio Liberty was a round table event with Yuri Schmidt as the honorary guest speaker. Yuri Schmidt was the founder of the Committee of Russian Lawyers in Defense of Human Rights.
- 28 January 2010: Round table event located at the Romanian Embassy in Prague, Czech Republic. Special guest of honor Juraj Chmiel, who will replace Štefan Füle as the Czech European affairs minister.
- 14 February 2009: Round table and public policy dinner with U.S. General Wesley Clark, former supreme allied commander of Europe. General Clark pushed for NATO membership of Central European nations like Hungary, Poland, and the Czech Republic after the fall of the Iron Curtain. During the round table discussion topics such as "energy security, Middle East missile defense and other international issues," were discussed.
- December 2004: Prague Society presents the Hanno R. Ellenbogen Citizenship Award to former NATO Secretary Baron Robertson of Port Ellen, who donated the financial reward of 150000kc to David Hodan.
