= Petra Procházková =

Czech journalist and humanitarian worker (born 1964)

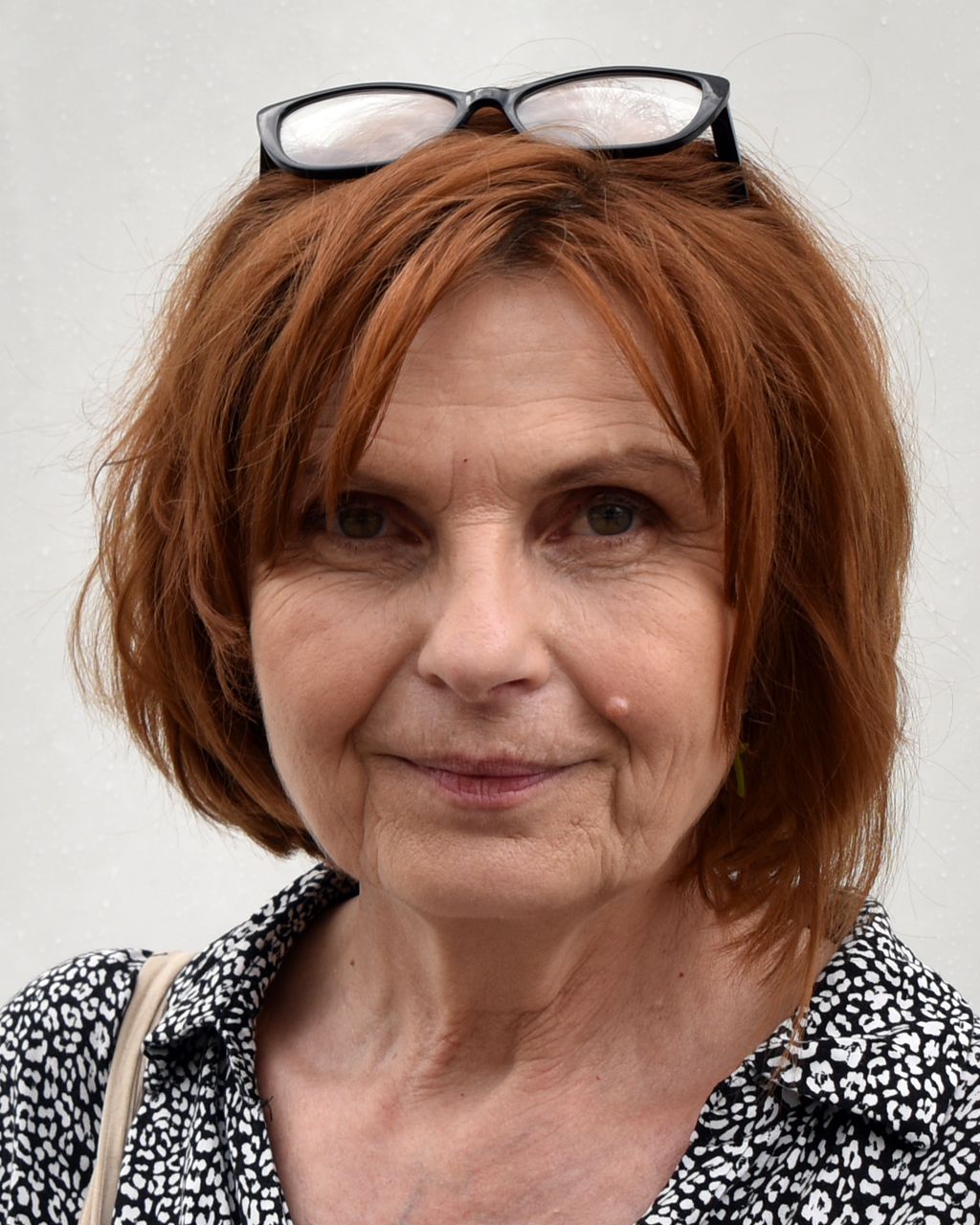
- Petra Procházková (2024)
- Born: Petra Švábová; 20 October 1964 (age 61); Český Brod, Czechoslovakia
- Education: Charles University
- Occupation: journalist

Petra Procházková (Czech pronunciation: [ˈpɛtra ˈproxaːskovaː]; born 20 October 1964 in Český Brod) is a Czech journalist and humanitarian worker. She is best known as a war correspondent from conflict areas of the former Soviet Union.

Procházková studied journalism at Charles University in Prague (graduated in 1986). In 1989 she started to work in the re-established newspaper Lidové noviny. In 1992 she became Lidové Noviny's Moscow correspondent. Here she began covering conflict areas—Abkhazia being the first. During Russian constitutional crisis of 1993 she was the only journalist staying in the besieged Russian White House. In 1994, together with fellow journalist Jaromír Štětina, Procházková founded the independent journalism agency Epicentrum dedicated to war reporting. In following years they covered events in Chechnya, Abkhazia, Ossetia, Georgia, Tajikistan, Afghanistan, Nagorny Karabakh, Kurdistan, Kashmir and East Timor. Her work has won several journalistic awards.

For several years, Procházková concentrated on wars in Chechnya and was in Groznyi when it was bombed for the first time. In June 1995, during the hostage-taking raid at Budyonnovsk in southern Russia, she offered herself in exchange for hostages taken from the hospital. Procházková reported the horrors of both the first and second Chechen War, often to the dismay of Russian authorities. During that time, she started to organize relief efforts for families ravaged by war. In 2000 she limited her work as a journalist and dedicated herself to humanitarian work, establishing a shelter for orphans in Groznyi. Her critique of Russian politics in Chechnya brought punishment—in 2000 she was forbidden to stay in Russia for a period of several years (and returned there only in late 2011).

After returning from Russia to the Czech Republic, Procházková founded a small humanitarian organisation Berkat which concentrates on aid mainly to Chechnya and Afghanistan. Adding to the list of volatile regions she has worked in, she began covering the situation in Afghanistan and was the last journalist to speak with Ahmed Shah Massoud before he was killed.

Procházková's second husband, Ibragim Zyazikov, an Ingushethian from the teip of Murat Zyazikov who worked as security guard for the People in Need organization, was kidnapped in Chechnya in February 2003 and disappeared without trace. In 2006, her son Zafar (named after her third husband, Zafar Paikar, a photographer from Afghanistan) was born.

In 2001, the cash prize of the Hanno R. Ellenbogen Citizenship Award was passed on to her by Madeleine Albright. In 2024, she was awarded the Order of Friendship by the Chechen government in exile.

== Books ==
- Petra Procházková, Jaromír Štětina: Utřete tělesné šťávy (Wipe out the body fluids), 2001, ISBN 80-86103-51-X. Collection of short stories about people pushed outside the society due to wartime cruelty.
- Jaromír Štětina, Petra Procházková: Rošangol, 2003, ISBN 80-86103-70-6. Two stories about women-mothers from the contemporary Afghanistan.
- Petra Procházková: Aluminiová královna: rusko-čečenská válka očima žen (The Aluminium Queen: The Russian-Chechen War Through the Eyes of Women), 2003, ISBN 80-7106-730-X. Document about women struggling for survival in Chechnya during the wars. It was translated into French, Swedish, Polish, Dutch and Estonian.
- Petra Procházková: Frišta, 2004, ISBN 80-7106-792-X. Novel about a Russian-Tadjik woman living in Afghanistan after the fall of Taliban.
