= Hanno R. Ellenbogen Citizenship Award =

Czech public service award

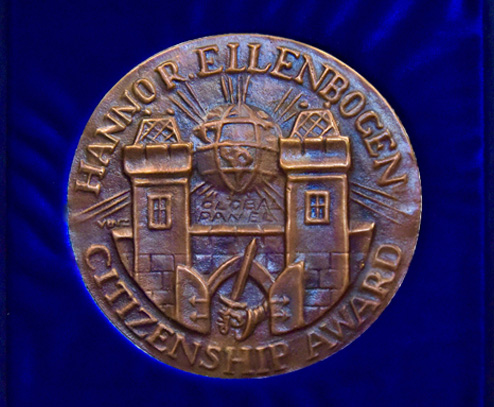
Front side of the handmade bronze HRE medallion.

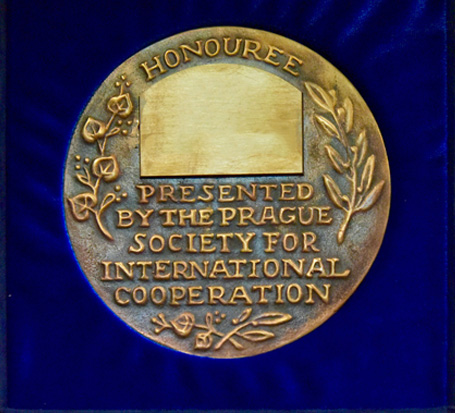
Back side of the handmade bronze HRE medallion.

The Hanno R. Ellenbogen Citizenship Award is a civil decoration given annually to honor individuals who have dedicated their lives to public service. It was established in 2000 by the Prague Society for International Cooperation and the Global Panel Foundation. It is named in honor of the Prague Society's President Marc S. Ellenbogen's mother who grew up in war torn Europe. The award comes with a 150,000 crown cash prize, which the award recipient passes on to a young person or institution in the public realm. For instance when the Czech Philharmonic Orchestra won the award in 2000, the cash prize was given to Lukas Vondracek, an aspiring musician at the time, who is now recognized worldwide.

== Award recipients ==
=== First – Vladimir Ashkenazy and the Conducting Corp of the Czech Philharmonic Orchestra ===
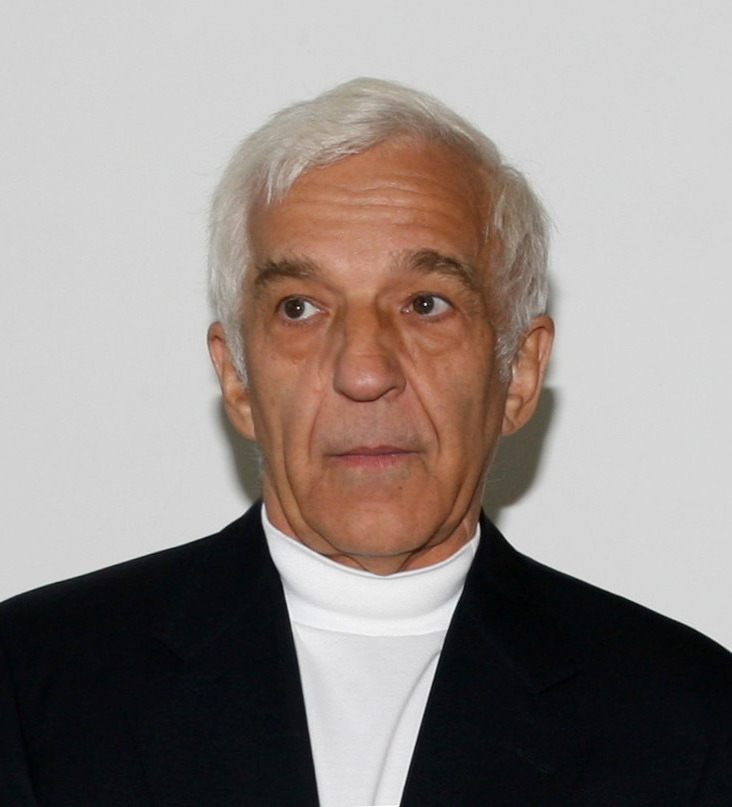
Vladimir Ashkenazy was the first recipient of the HRE Citizenship Award.

Maestro Vladimir Ashkenazy (the Chief Conductor), and the Conducting Corp of the Czech Philharmonic Orchestra (Include: Vladimir Valek (the permanent conductor), Sir Charles Mackerras and Ken-Ichiro Kobayashi (the principal guest conductors)). Askenazy devoted his first years as a musician to the piano. After winning first prizes in Brussels in 1956 and Moscow in 1962, he spent three decades touring the great musical centers of the world. From the 1970s, he became increasingly active as a conductor and held positions with the Philharmonia Orchestra, Royal Philharmonic Orchestra, Cleveland Orchestra and Deutsches Symphonie-Orchester Berlin. From 1998 to 2003 Ashkenazy led the Conducting Corps of the Czech Philharmonic Orchestra, with whom he undertook the major Prokofiev-Shostakovich series in 2003. Vladimir Valek has performed in many major cities around the world like Brussels, Cairo, Copenhagen, London, New York, Paris, Beijing, Tokyo, and Vienna. Sir Charles Mackerras (in memoriam), born in Australia, had a passion for music his entire life and was honored with many awards throughout his life. Kobayashi was the first Asian Conductor to conduct at the Prague Spring Music Festival in 2002.

==== Financial part donated to Lukáš Vondráček ====
Born in the Czech Republic in 1986, Lukáš Vondráček's musical ability was spotted at the age of two by his mother, herself a professional pianist. He gave his first concert at the age of 4, and by the age of 20 had visited 22 countries giving in excess of 850 concerts. Vladimir Ashkenazy was the conductor when Lukáš made his debut with the Czech Philharmonic Orchestra in May 2002 with concerts in Prague and Italy. Since then he has appeared frequently with the orchestra, including a major USA tour, and concerts in Cologne, Vienna, Lucerne, Bad Kissingen, and Birmingham's Symphony Hall. In 2010, he won First Prize at the 10th Hilton Head International Piano Competition in South Carolina, USA. Most recently, Lukas won First Prize, Grand Prize plus 4 special prizes at the 2012 UNISA Vodacom International Piano Competition in Pretoria, South Africa. In 2016 Lukas Vondráček won the Queen Elisabeth Piano Competition in 2016.

=== Second – Madeleine Albright ===
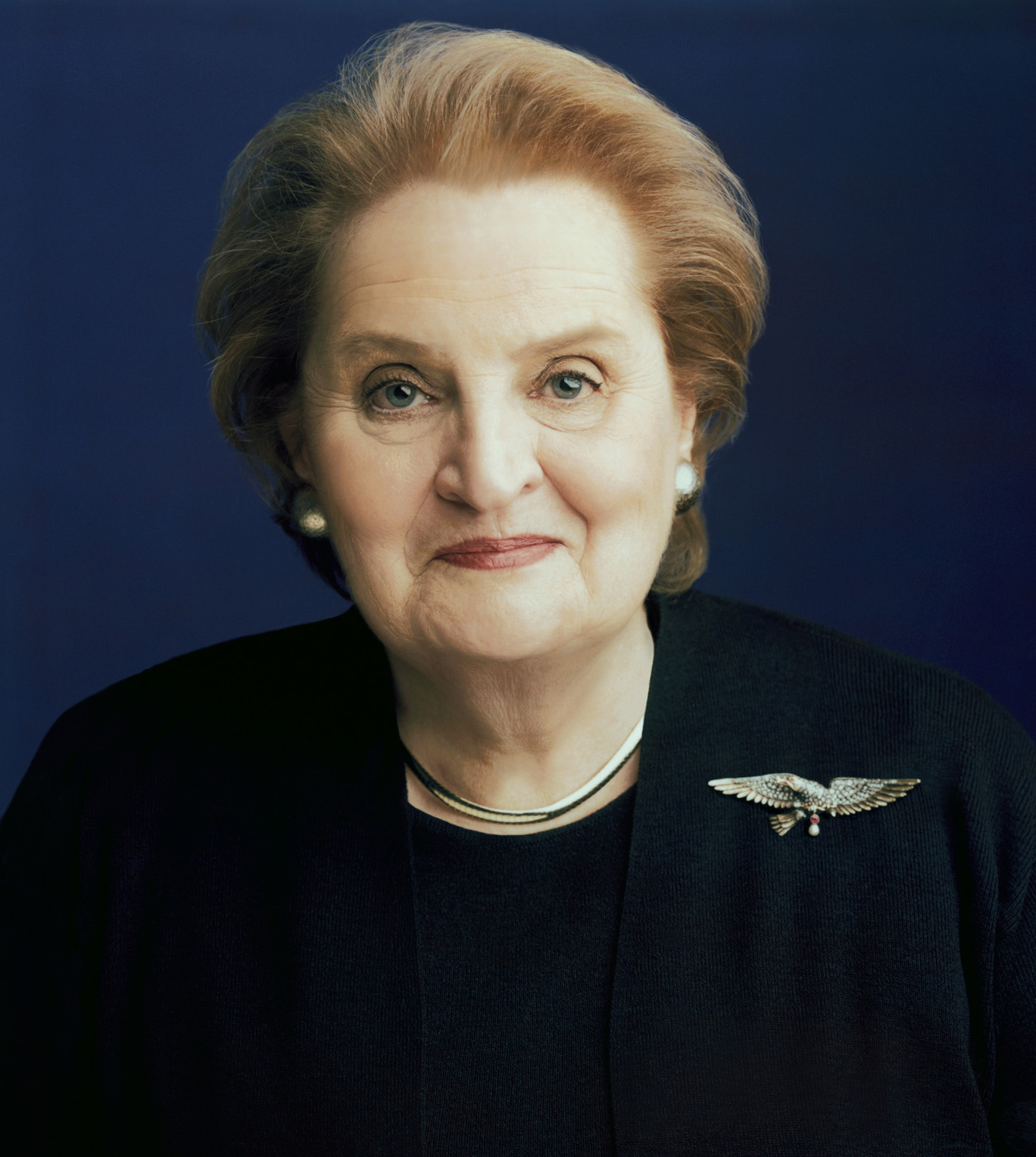
Madeleine Albright was the second recipient of the HRE Citizenship Award.

Madeleine Albright served as the 64th Secretary of State of the United States. She was the first woman Secretary of State and the highest-ranking woman in the history of the US government. As Secretary, Albright reinforced America's alliances, advocated democracy and human rights, and promoted American trade and business abroad. Serving as a member of the President's Cabinet & National Security Council for 8 years, Albright was the US Permanent Representative to the UN from 1993 to 1997. Albright is the first Michael & Virginia Mortara Endowed Professor in the Practice of Diplomacy at the Georgetown School of Foreign Service. She is the chairman of The National Democratic Institute for International Affairs and founder of the Albright Group, a global strategy firm delivering solutions and advice for businesses in a rapidly changing world.

==== Financial component donated to Petra Procházková ====
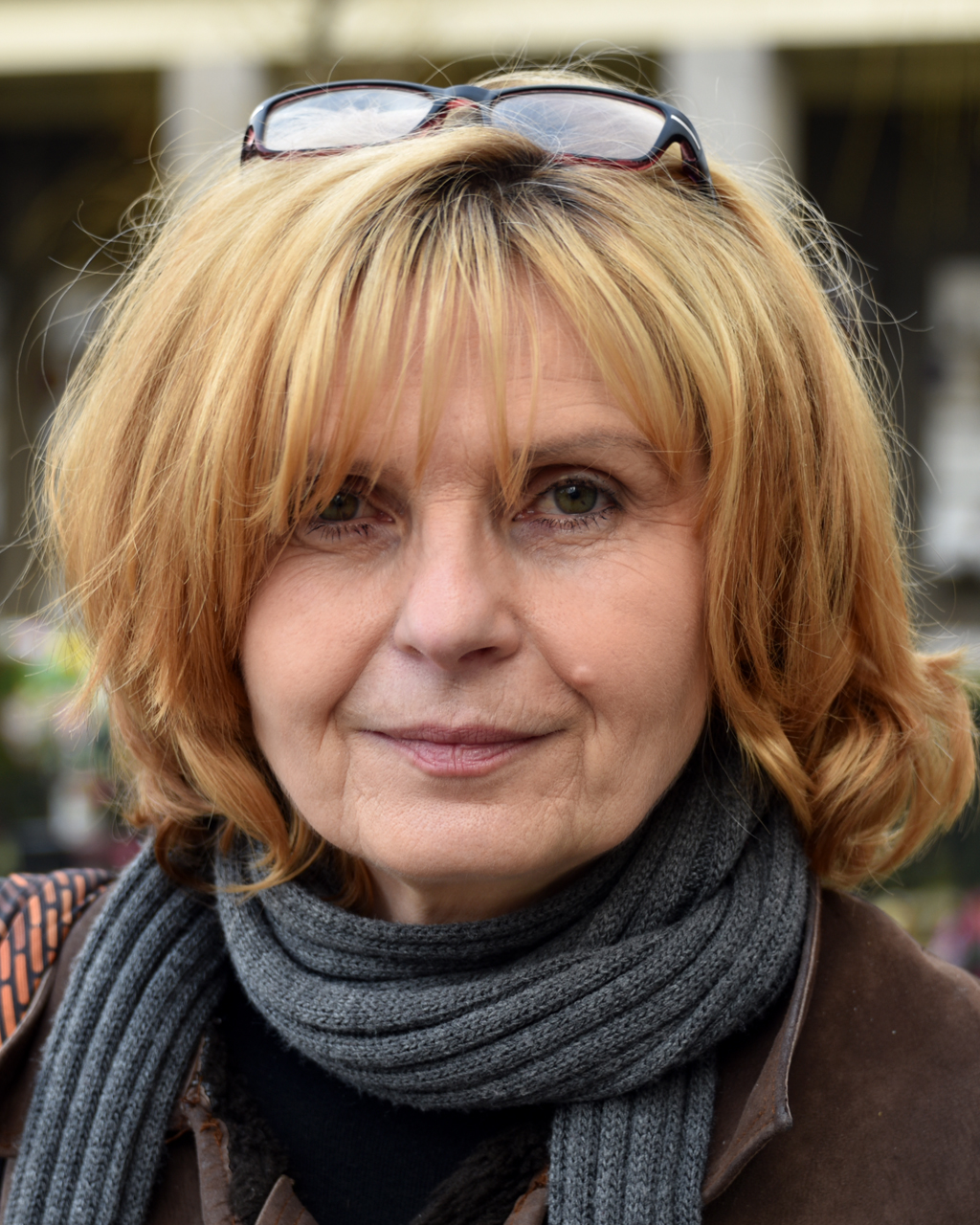
Petra Procházková was the 2nd financial recipient of the HRE Citizenship Award.

Madeleine Albright donated financial part to Petra Procházková, a Czech journalist and humanitarian worker. She is best known as a war correspondent to the conflict areas of the former Soviet Union. Procházková studied journalism at Charles University in Prague. In 1989 she started work at the newspaper Lidové noviny. In 1992 she became Lidové Noviny's Moscow correspondent. Here she began covering conflict areas - Abkhazia being the first. During the Russian constitutional crisis of 1993 she was the only journalist that stayed in the besieged Russian White House. In 1994, together with fellow journalist Jaromír Štětina, Procházková founded the independent journalism agency Epicentrum dedicated to war reporting. In the following years she covered events in Chechnya, Abkhazia, Ossetia, Georgia, Tajikistan, Afghanistan, Nagorny Karabakh, Kurdistan, Kashmir and East Timor.

=== Third – Václav Havel ===
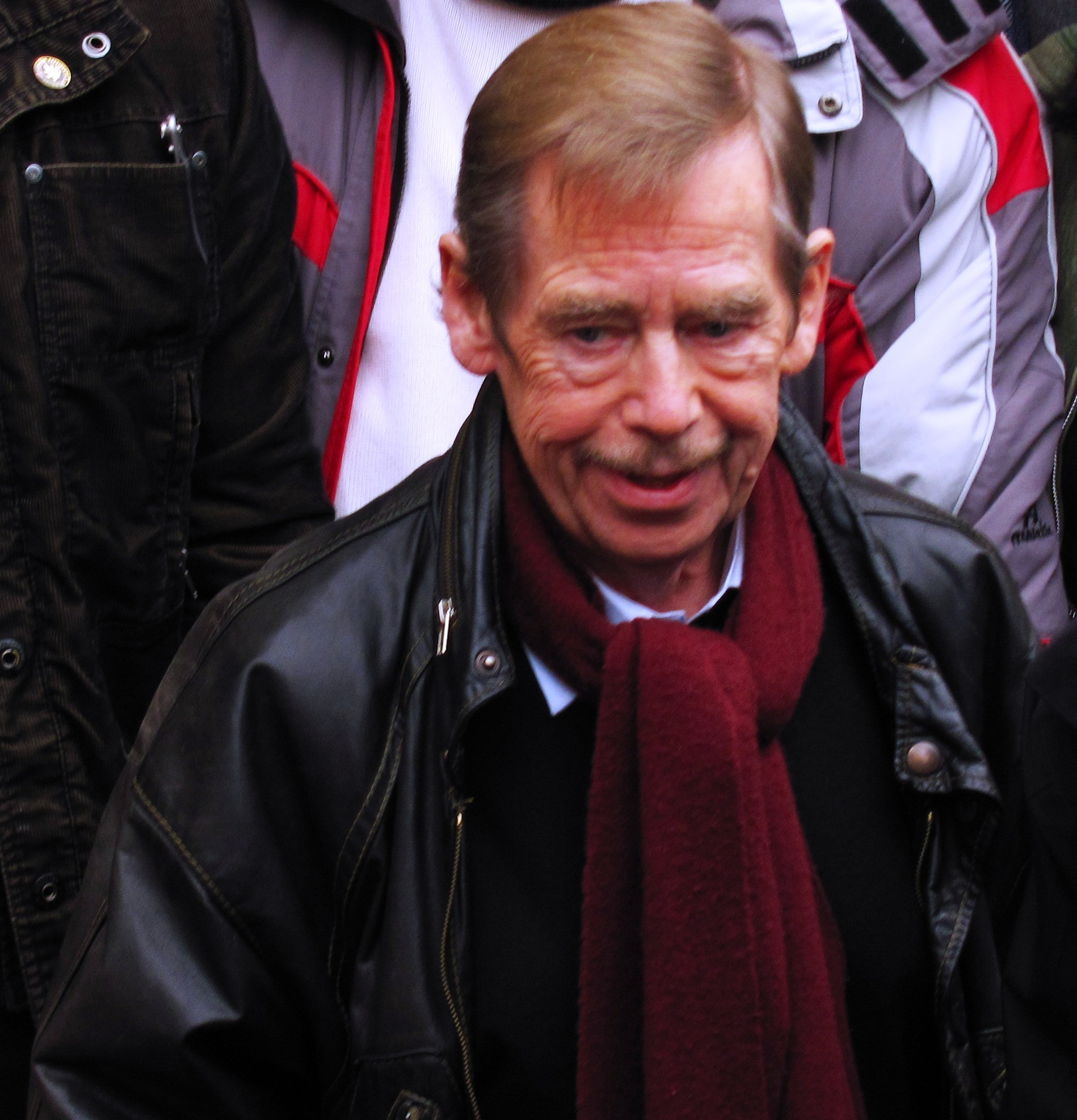
Václav Havel was the third recipient of the HRE Citizenship Award.

Václav Havel grew up in a circle which maintained Czechoslovakia's independent culture in defiance of the Communist regime of the time. Excluded from higher education, he made his name in the 1960s with satirical plays which contributed to the intellectual atmosphere of the Prague Spring. During the normalisation period which followed the Soviet invasion he took menial jobs whilst his work was published in samizdat. He was one of the first three spokesmen for Charter 77, and a member of the Committee for the Defence of the Unjustly Prosecuted. He was sentenced to four and a half years hard labour, resulting in a breakdown in his health. After his release in 1983 he continued to be a leading member of the opposition movement which culminated in the Velvet Revolution of 1989. He was elected the first President of a free Czechoslovakia and subsequently of the Czech Republic.

==== Financial component donated to Andrej Dyńko ====
Václav Havel donated the financial part to Andrej Dyńko, the editor-in-chief of the independent Belarusian newspaper Nasha Niva. Openly critical to President Lukashenko's regime, and the only major newspaper written in Belarusian, Nasha Niva has become an important symbol of freedom and independence. Dynko is a Graduate from Minsk State Linguistic University, and holds an MA in International Relations. Until August 2000, he also taught at his alma mater. From 2002, Dynko has been the Vice-President of the Belarusian PEN Center.

=== Fourth – Lord Robertson of Port Ellen ===
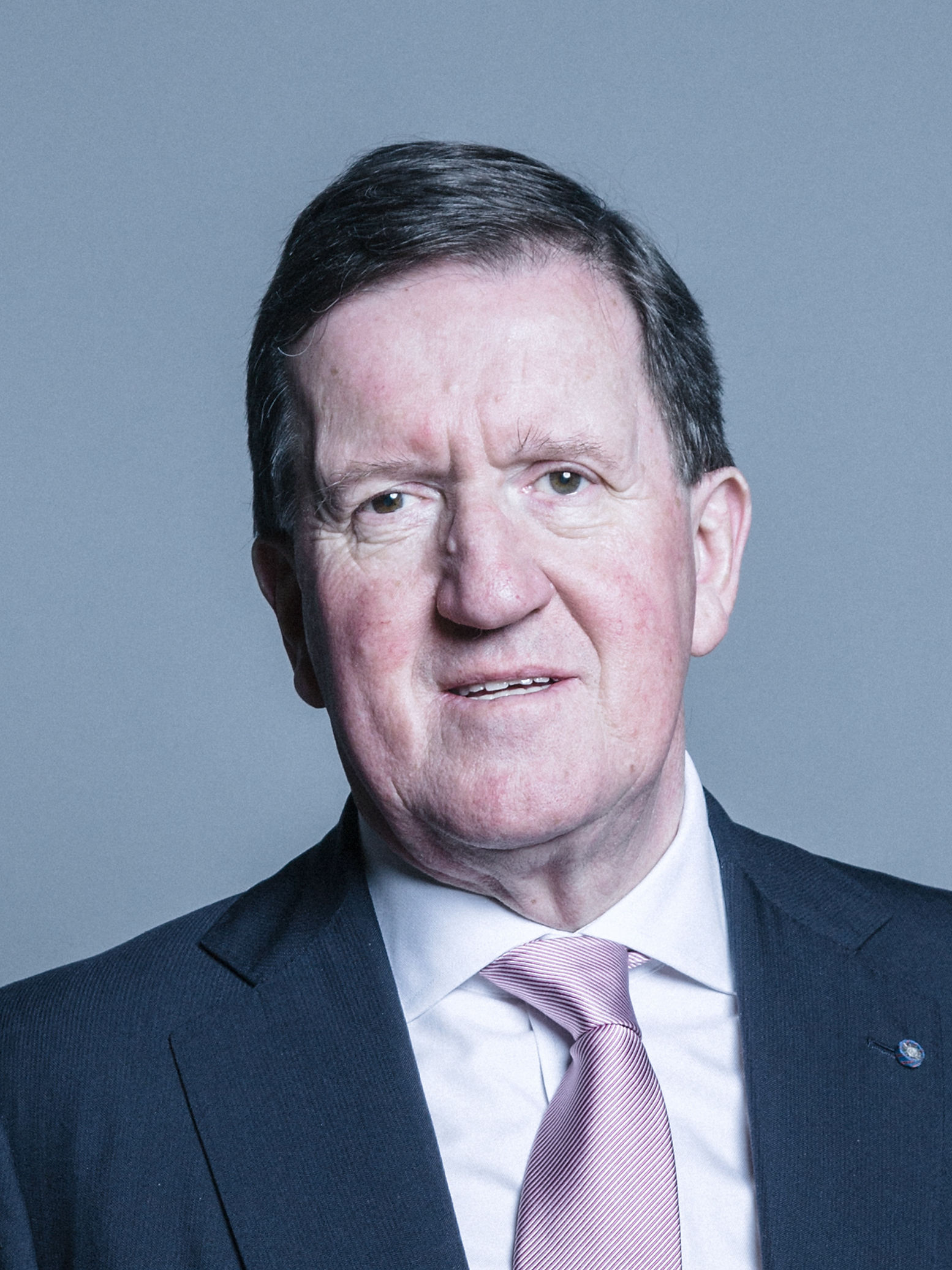
Lord Robertson of Port Ellen was the fourth recipient of the HRE Citizenship Award.

Lord Robertson, born on the Isle of Islay in Scotland, was elected to the House of Commons in 1978. After the Labour Party won the elections in 1997, Prime Minister Blair appointed him as the Defence Secretary of the United Kingdom. In August 1999 he was selected as the tenth Secretary General of NATO, and the same month received a life peerage, taking the title Lord Robertson of Port Ellen. For 7 years he was on the Council of the Royal Institute of International Affairs (Chatham House) where he now serves as Joint President. He has been awarded the Grand Cross of the German Order of Merit and the Grand Cross of the Order of the Star of Romania and was named joint Parliamentarian of the Year in 1993 for his role during the Maastricht Treaty ratification. He was appointed a member of Her Majesty Queen Elizabeth's Privy Council in May 1997.

==== Financial component donated to David Hodan ====
Lord Robertson donated the financial part to David Hodan, who first met Lord Robertson in May 2003. Encouraged by Ms Bela Gran Jensen, founder of the "Centipede" movement, he wrote an essay named "What I would do if I were General Secretary of NATO". Lord Robertson read the essay and asked to meet David, saying that he especially liked the quotation from Charlie Chaplin which David used in the essay: "I am interested in my future because that is where I am going to spend the rest of my life." The meeting took place within sight of Prague Castle – which David likes to call his "future seat". A student at the Terezie Brzková 33-35 school in Pilsen (of which Marc S. Ellenbogen is a Patron), his ambition is one day to become President of this country. As he says himself, he is an "ordinary boy" with the interests of a boy of his age – he reads a lot and works with computers, but he also has a special interest in current world events, politics and medicine. He is particularly concerned about parts of the world where children suffer as a result of military conflict. David is a boy with the courage to say what he thinks, and to have dreams which may come true.

=== Fifth – Miloš Forman ===
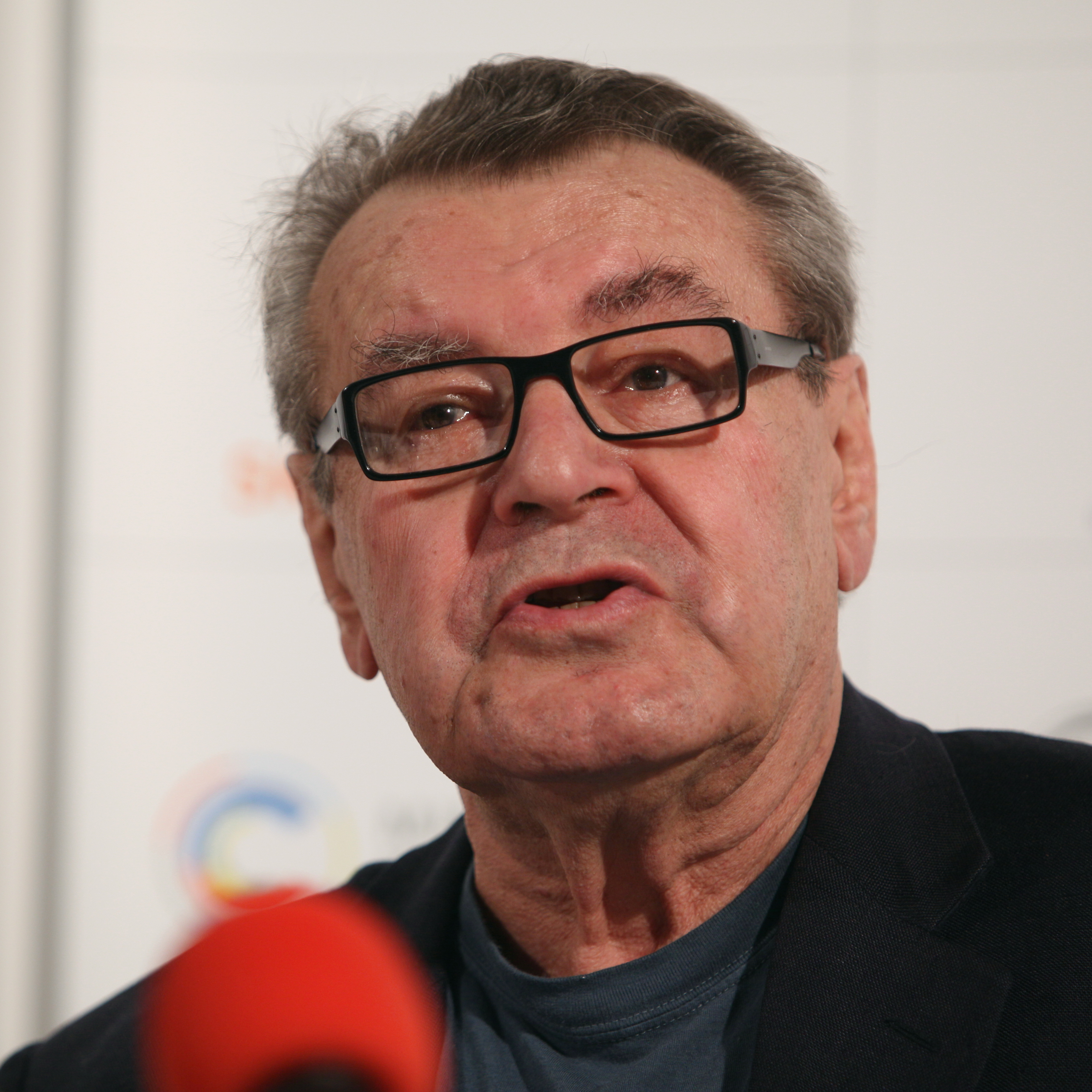
Miloš Forman was the fifth recipient of the HRE Citizenship Award.

Miloš Forman, born in Čáslav, outside Prague, he lost both his parents in the Nazi death camps. After studying in Prague he made his first feature film in 1963: Black Peter, an autobiographical account of a teenager in a small Czech town. He gained international recognition with Loves of a Blonde. Despite this, his next film, The Firemen's Ball, attracted the attention of the Communist authorities and was banned. After the Soviet invasion of 1968, Forman settled in America, winning international fame with One Flew Over the Cuckoo's Nest. It swept the Academy Awards, winning all five major Oscars. From his earliest Czechoslovak work through his American period to Goya's Ghosts, Forman's directing remains close to the reality of life; its absurdity and transforming joys.

==== Financial component donated to the Film Academy of Miroslav Ondříček in Písek ====
The financial component of the award was donated to the Film Academy of Miroslav Ondříček in Písek. The Film Academy divided financial part into three parts of 50,000 crowns each to provide scholarships for students. The first recipient was the 27-year-old student of film, Martin Palouš, who received the Award from Marc S. Ellenbogen on 11 October 2007 at the celebratory opening of the Písek Film Festival.

=== Sixth – Romania's King Michael I ===
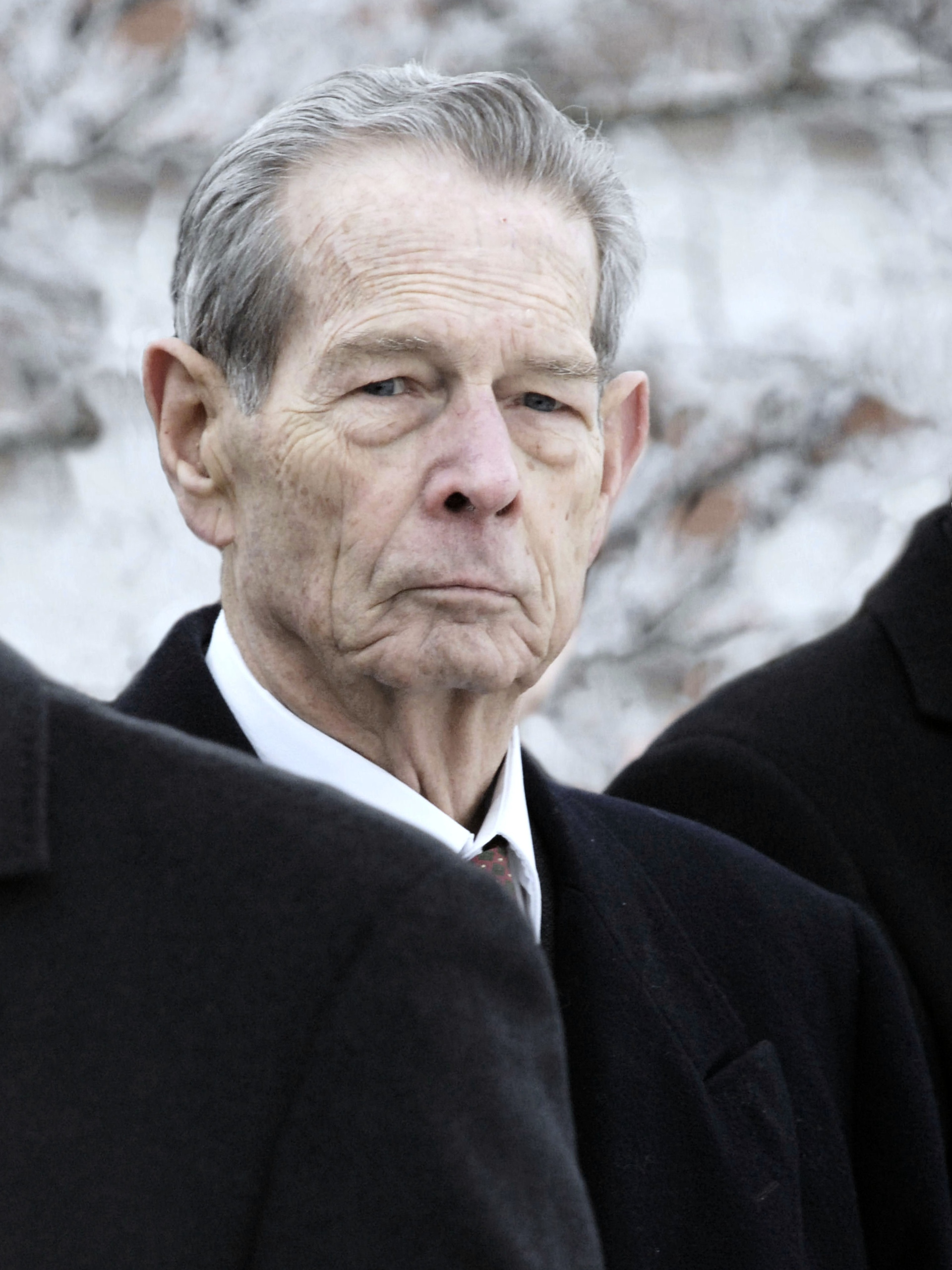
King Michael I of Romania was the sixth recipient of the HRE Citizenship Award.

His Majesty King Michael I of Romania (born 1922; died 2017) was twice Head of State in Romania: from 1927 to 1930 and from 1940 to 1947, when he was deposed by the Communists, stripped of his citizenship, and banished from the country. Over the next fifty-five years he worked as a mechanic, commercial pilot and businessman and, with his wife Queen Anne, Princess of Bourbon-Parma, brought up their five daughters. In 1997 he said in an interview: "The King is head of state but he is also the first servant of the people. Never forget that."

Financial component donated to Petrisor Ostafie

A student of medical bio-engineering in Iasi, Petrisor Ostafie is an example of someone who, on receiving something, returns more than was given. He proved this by being first a volunteer and then a member of the Board of the Alaturi de Voi (Close to You) Romania Foundation. In addition, he exudes in speaking on numerous occasions about what it means to live with HIV and has become an example for many young people in the same situation. Petrisor has spent over 4000 hours of voluntary work on programs developed by the Alaturi de Voi Romania Foundation and has brought hope to over 200 young people living with HIV.

=== Seventh – Alexander Milinkevich (Alaksandar Milinkievič) ===
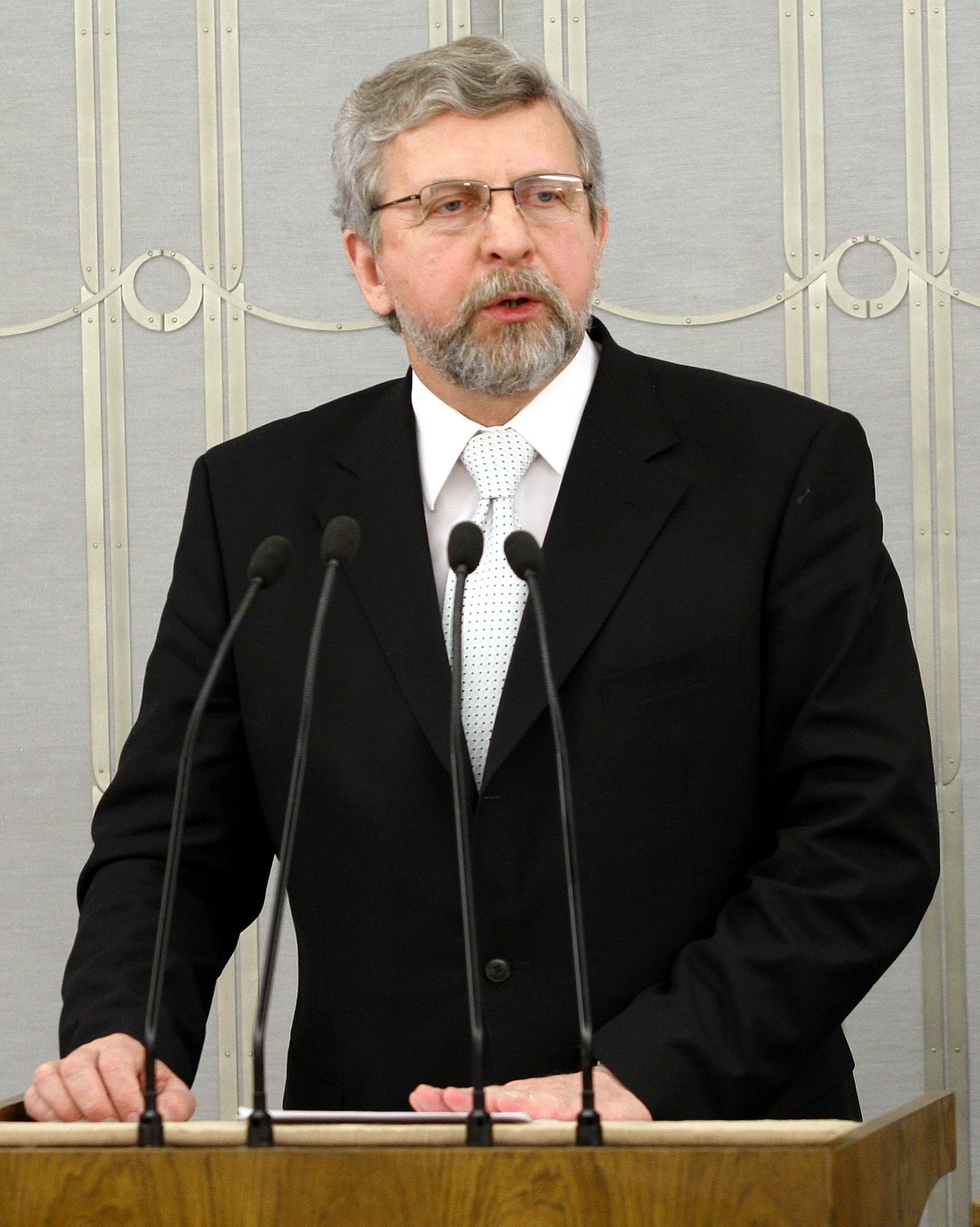
Alaksandar Milinkievič was the seventh recipient of the HRE Citizenship Award.

Alaksandar Milinkievič became involved in the local politics of his home city, Hrodna, in the 1980s. Four years in Algiers setting up the Faculty of Physics at Sétif University, had given him a wider experience of the world than his contemporaries. After the fall of the Soviet Union, he entered national politics, becoming Chief of Staff to one of the opposition leaders. In 2005 he was chosen by the United Democratic Forces of Belarus as joint candidate of the opposition in the presidential elections of 2006, to stand against the authoritarian Alexander Lukashenko. He was held by the police before and after the elections on false charges of drunken driving, forgery, drug trafficking and leaving Belarus illegally.

==== Financial component donated to Pavel Sieviarynets ====
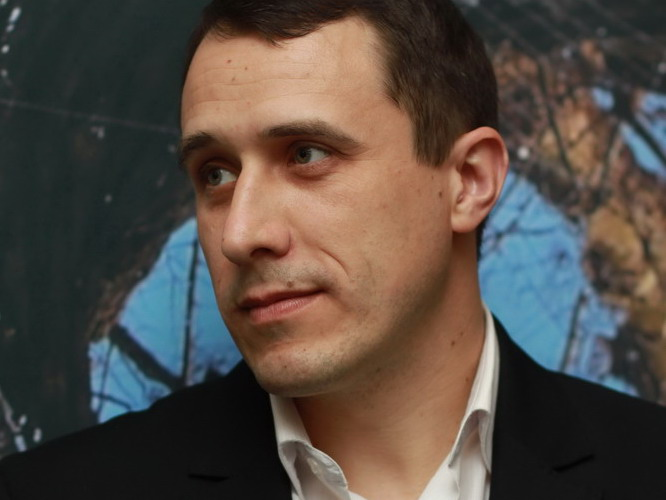
Paval Sieviaryniec was the seventh financial recipient of the HRE Citizenship Award.

Paval Sieviaryniec is a Belarusian politician, a leader of the Christian Democratic Party, and the founder of the Young Front. He is a publicist and author of books and articles concerning his political views and opposition to the current government.

=== Eighth – in honor of Desmond Mullan ===
In honor of Desmond Mullan (in memoriam). Mullan, managing director of Volvo Auto Czech 2000-2006, was one of the Prague Society's main supporters. He was involved in many fields during his time in the Czech Republic: Vice-Chairman of the British Chamber of Commerce, he was also well known for his support of the International School of Prague, and an active member of the congregation of the Roman Catholic Church of St Thomas in Mala Strana. Hundreds of friends attended his funeral in St Thomas's. For his warm heart, generosity, and for all the good deeds he and his wife Helen did while they lived in Prague, the Prague Society had the honor to make him a special recipient of the HRE Citizenship Award in memoriam. This was a special award with no secondary nominee.

=== Ninth – the 14th Dalai Lama ===
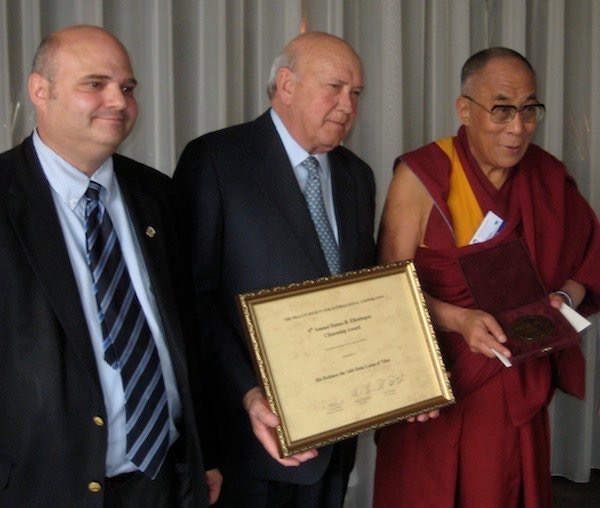
The 14th Dalai Lama receiving the Hanno R. Ellenbogen Citizenship Award in the appearance of Nobel Laureate F.W. De Klerk and Marc Ellenbogen

The 14th Dalai Lama Tenzin Gyatso, is both the head of state and the spiritual leader of Tibet. In 1950 the Dalai Lama was called upon to assume full political power after China's invasion of Tibet in 1949. In 1954, he went to Beijing for peace talks with Mao Zedong and other Chinese leaders, including Deng Xiaoping and Zhou Enlai. Since the Chinese invasion of Tibet, the Dalai Lama has appealed to the United Nations on the question of Tibet. The General Assembly adopted three resolutions on Tibet in 1959, 1961 and 1965. In September 1987 the Dalai Lama proposed the Five Point Peace Plan for Tibet as the first step towards a peaceful solution to the worsening situation in Tibet. In 1989 he was awarded the Nobel Peace Prize for his non-violent struggle for the liberation of Tibet. He has consistently advocated policies of non-violence, even in the face of extreme aggression. He also became the first Nobel Laureate to be recognized for his concern for global environmental problems.

Financial component donated to Dobrý Anjel

The 14th Dalai Lama donated the financial part to the Slovak charity "Dobrý anjel" (Good Angel) which helps families of children that suffer from cancer or other insidious diseases such as: cerebral palsy, cystic fibrosis, chronic renal failure, muscular dystrophy or down syndrome. Donations are made to families based on financial need. The charity was founded by Igor Brossmann and Andrej Kiska.

=== Tenth – Adam Michnik ===
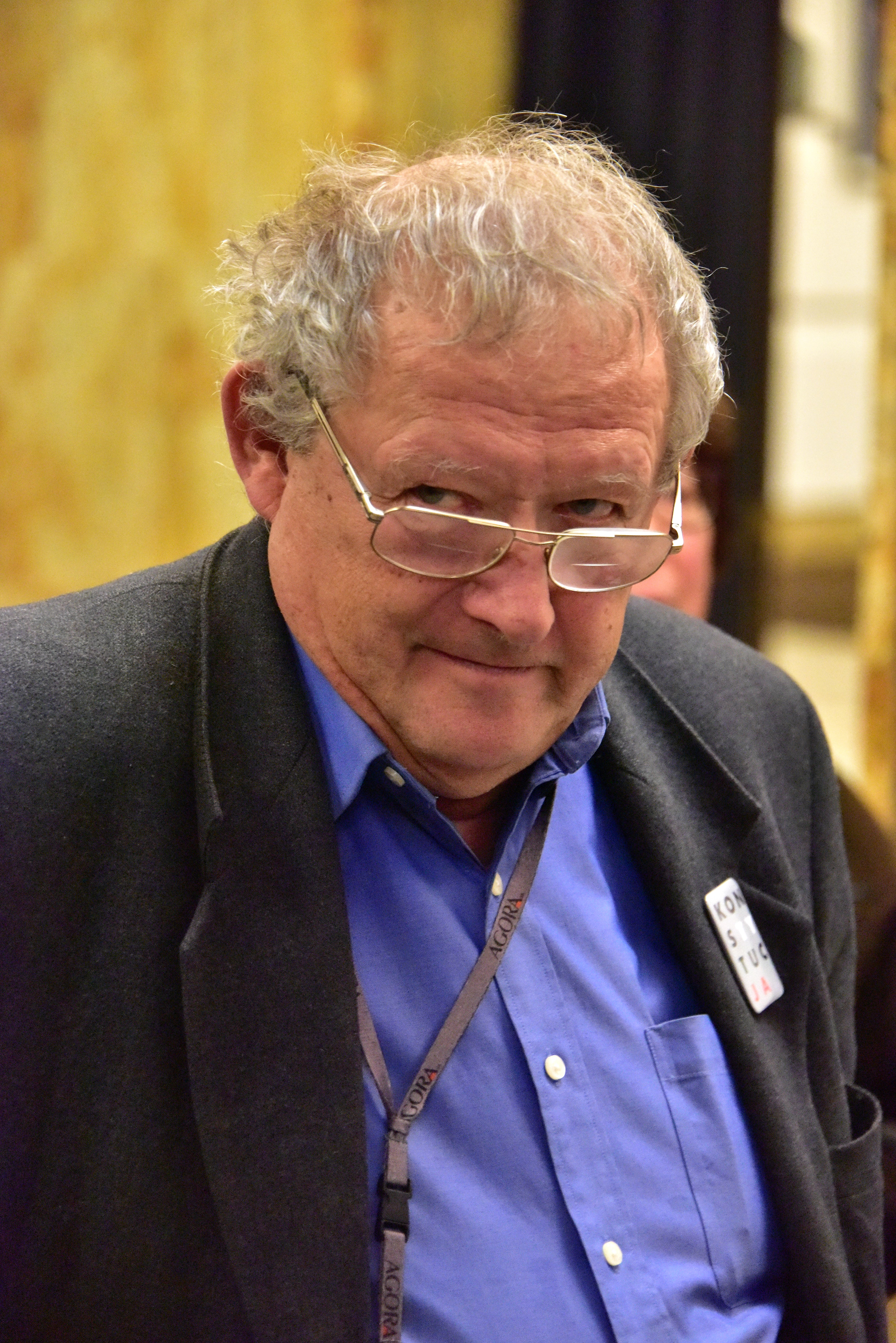
Adam Michnik was the tenth recipient of the HRE Citizenship Award.

Adam Michnik is the editor-in-chief of Gazeta Wyborcza, the biggest daily in Poland and the first independent news daily after Communism. A historian and co-founder of KOR (Committee for the Defense of Workers) 1976, he was detained many times during 1965-1980 and was a prominent Solidarity activist during the 80s, and spent a total of six years in Polish prisons for activities opposing the communist regime. Member of the Round Table Talks in 1989; member of the first non-communist parliament 1989-1991. He is the Laureat of many prizes and titles: Robert F. Kennedy Human Rights Award; The Erasmus Prize; The Francisco Cerecedo Journalist Prize as a first non-Spanish author; Grand Prince Giedymin Order; Chevalier de la Légion d'honneur; recipient of a doctorate honoris causa from The New School for Social Research in New York, from the University of Minnesota, University of Michigan and from Connecticut College; honorary senator of the University of Ljubljana; and honorary professor of the Kyiv Mohyla Academy.

Financial component donated to Young Journalists

Michnik presented the financial portion of the award to two young journalists at the Polish daily Gazeta Wyborcza, Juliusz Kurkiewicz and Aleksandra Klich-Siewiorek.

=== Eleventh – Wesley Clark, Jiří Dienstbier, and Andrés Pastrana ===
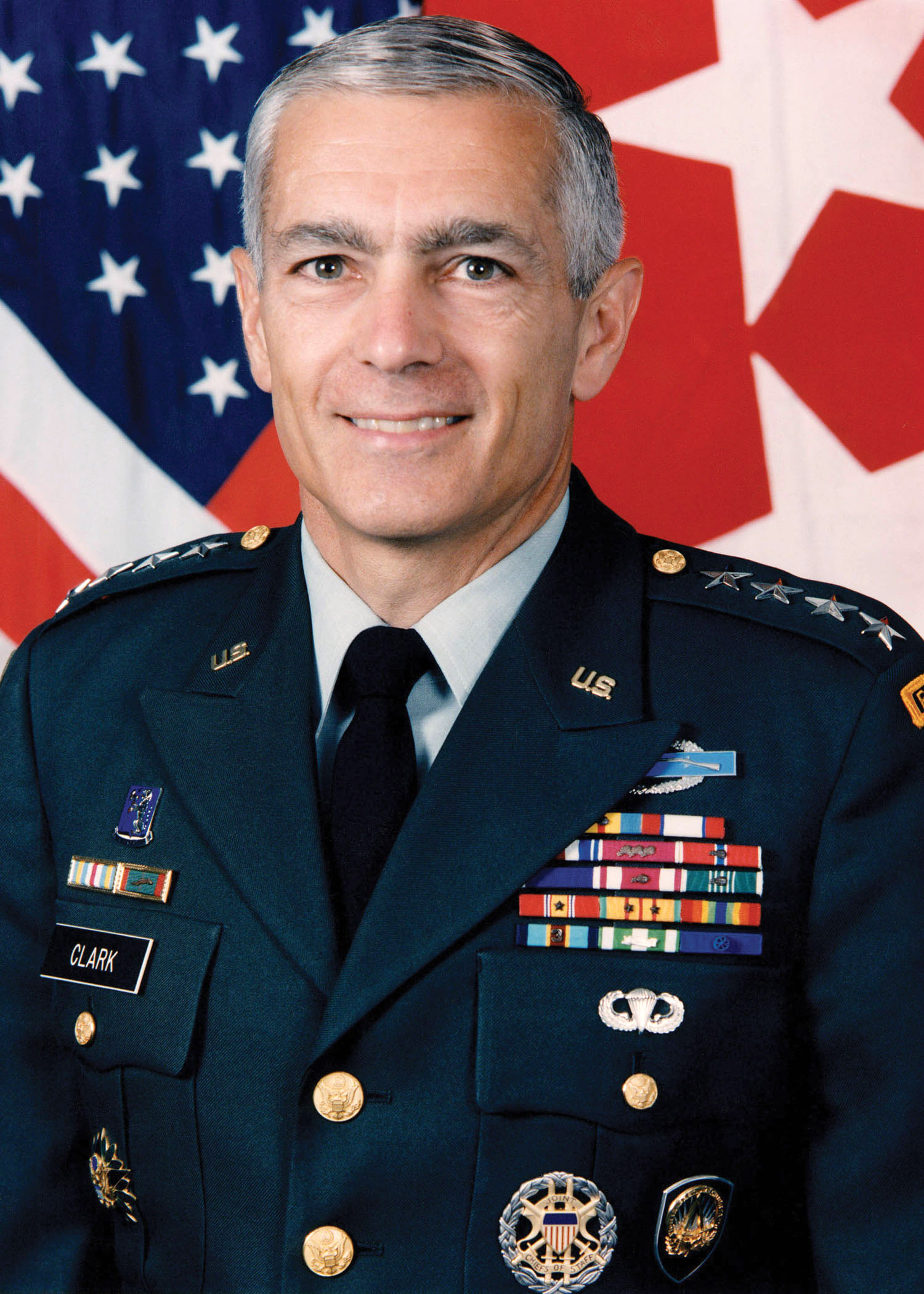
Wesley Clark was the eleventh recipient of the HRE Citizenship Award.

Wesley Clark served the United States with honor for 34 years. He was the Supreme Allied Commander of NATO (SACEUR) and a US presidential candidate in 2004. Almost immediately after becoming SACEUR Clark started pushing for NATO membership for Hungary, Poland and the Czech Republic. He became the first NATO commander to visit Prague after the fall of Communism. His legacy in the region is marked by these efforts and Kosovo.

=== Twelfth - Wesley Clark, Jiří Dienstbier and Andrés Pastrana ===
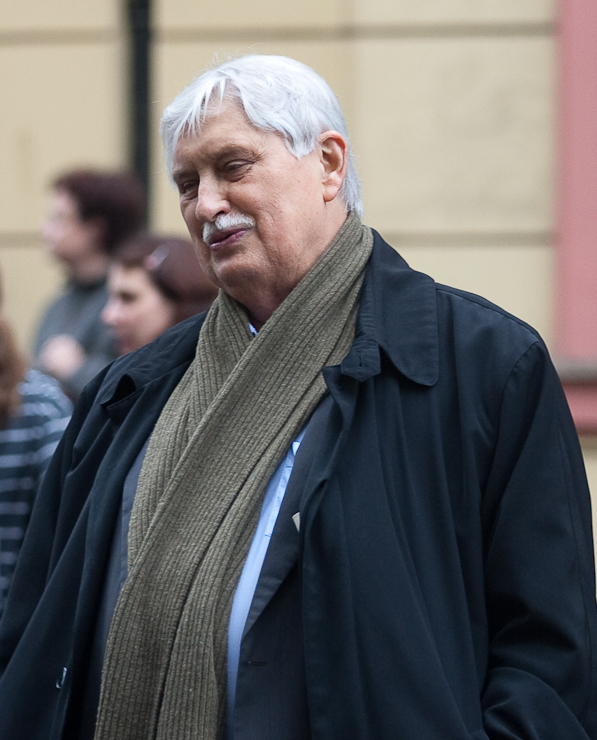
Jiří Dienstbier was twelfth recipient of the HRE Citizenship Award.

As one of Czechoslovakia's most respected foreign correspondents, Jiří Dienstbier lost his job after the end of Prague Spring and had menial jobs for the following two decades. During this time he became a signatory of Charta 77, helped to restart Lidové Noviny, one of the country's major newspapers. Later he reemerged with the Velvet Revolution, becoming the first Foreign Minister of post-Communist Czechoslovakia in 1989.

Dienstbier became a hero to millions when, together with then German Foreign Minister Hans-Dietrich Genscher and Austrian Foreign Minister Alois Mock, he cut the "iron curtain." The images spread across the world.

As a politician he played a pre-eminent role in shaping post-Communist foreign policy in a democratic Czechoslovakia between 1989 and 1993 and from Central Europe to Asia to the Middle East. When the Czech Republic and Slovakia separated as states, he played a leading role as a commentator and thoughtful rebel. Finally he entered politics again in the 21st century as a Senator and Chair of the Senate Foreign Relations Committee.

==== Financial component donated to Jiřina Dienstbierová ====
The financial component of Jiří Dienstbier's award was donated to fund the design and publishing of a new book, "Jiří Dienstbier – rozhlasový zpravodaj."

=== Thirteenth – Wesley Clark, Jiří Dienstbier and Andrés Pastrana Arango ===
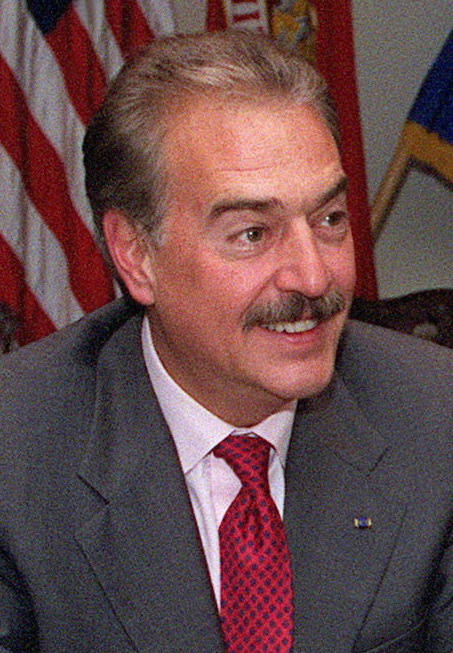
Andrés Pastrana Arango was the thirteenth recipient of the HRE Cititzenship Award.

Andrés Pastrana Arango was President of Colombia from 1998-2002. As a lawyer and journalist, Pastrana had been dedicated to fighting corruption and the Colombian drug trade that lies at the root of his country's civil conflict already before he became president. As President he was determined to solve the armed conflict - through negotiation rather than force. While Colombia has not found peace to this day, its army found itself in a much better position to face the major guerrilla organizations after Pastrana's term. During his administration Colombia regained the support of the international community that previously had turned its back on it and the country gained economic support and military aid. At the same time he left Colombia's guerrilla organizations politically undermined with Colombians regarding them as terrorists rather than freedom fighters.

=== Fourteenth – Věra Čáslavská ===
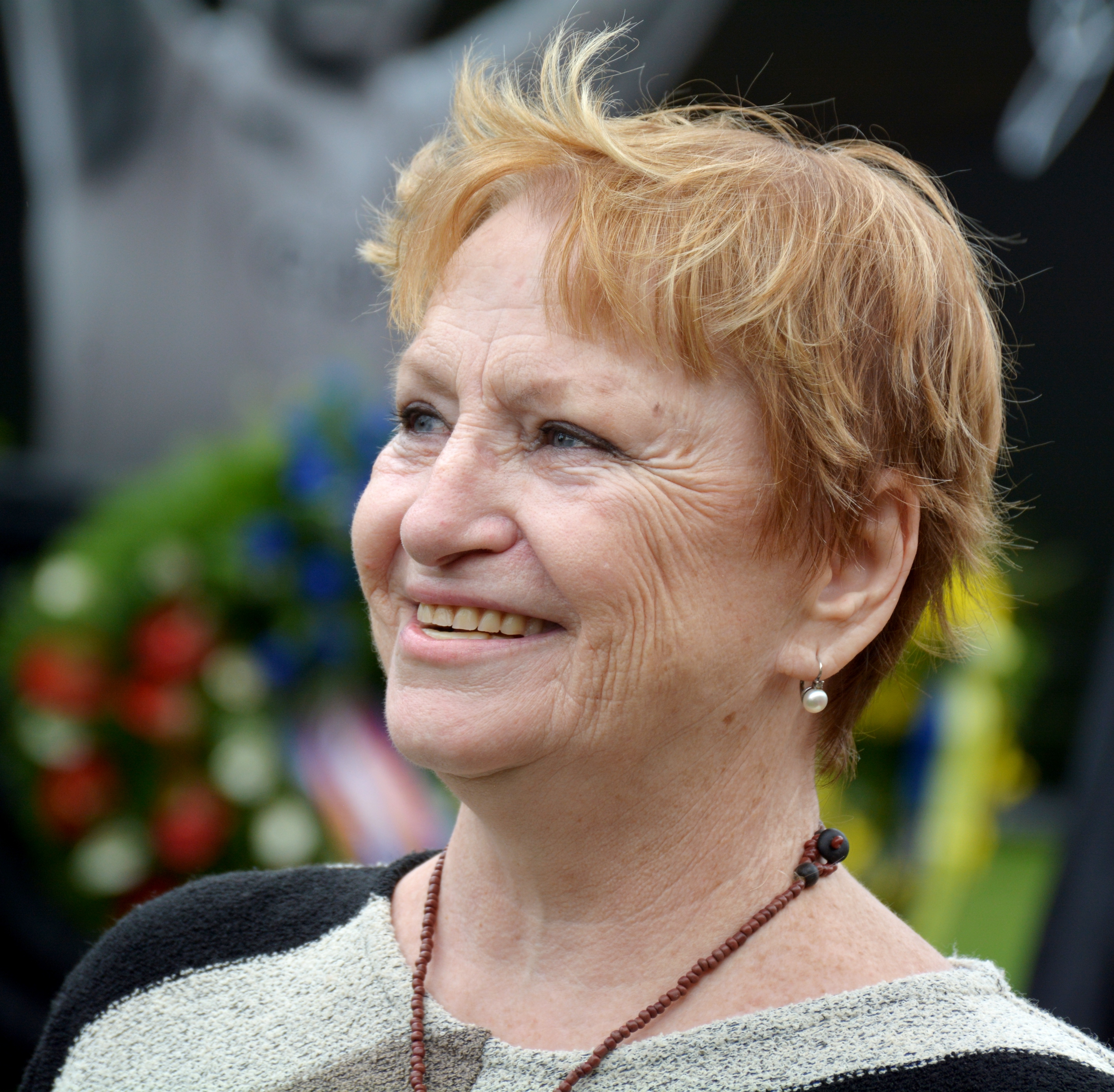
Věra Čáslavská was the fourteenth recipient of the HRE Citizenship Award.

Věra Čáslavská won seven Olympic gold medals before she was forced into retirement and for many years was denied the right to travel, work and attend sporting events following her protest against the Soviet-led occupation of Czechoslovakia in 1968. A signatory of The Two Thousand Words manifesto, Čáslavská was known for her outspoken support of the Czechoslovak democratization movement. At the 1968 Olympics in Mexico City she quietly looked down and away while the Soviet national anthem was played during medal ceremonies. Her subtle but highly public and widely understood protest resulted in her becoming a persona non grata in the new regime.

==== Financial component donated to the primary school in Černošice ====
The financial component of Věra Čáslavská's award was donated to eight hundred children, and to support construction of a sports hall at Primary School in Černošice.

=== Fifteenth – Iva Drápalová ===
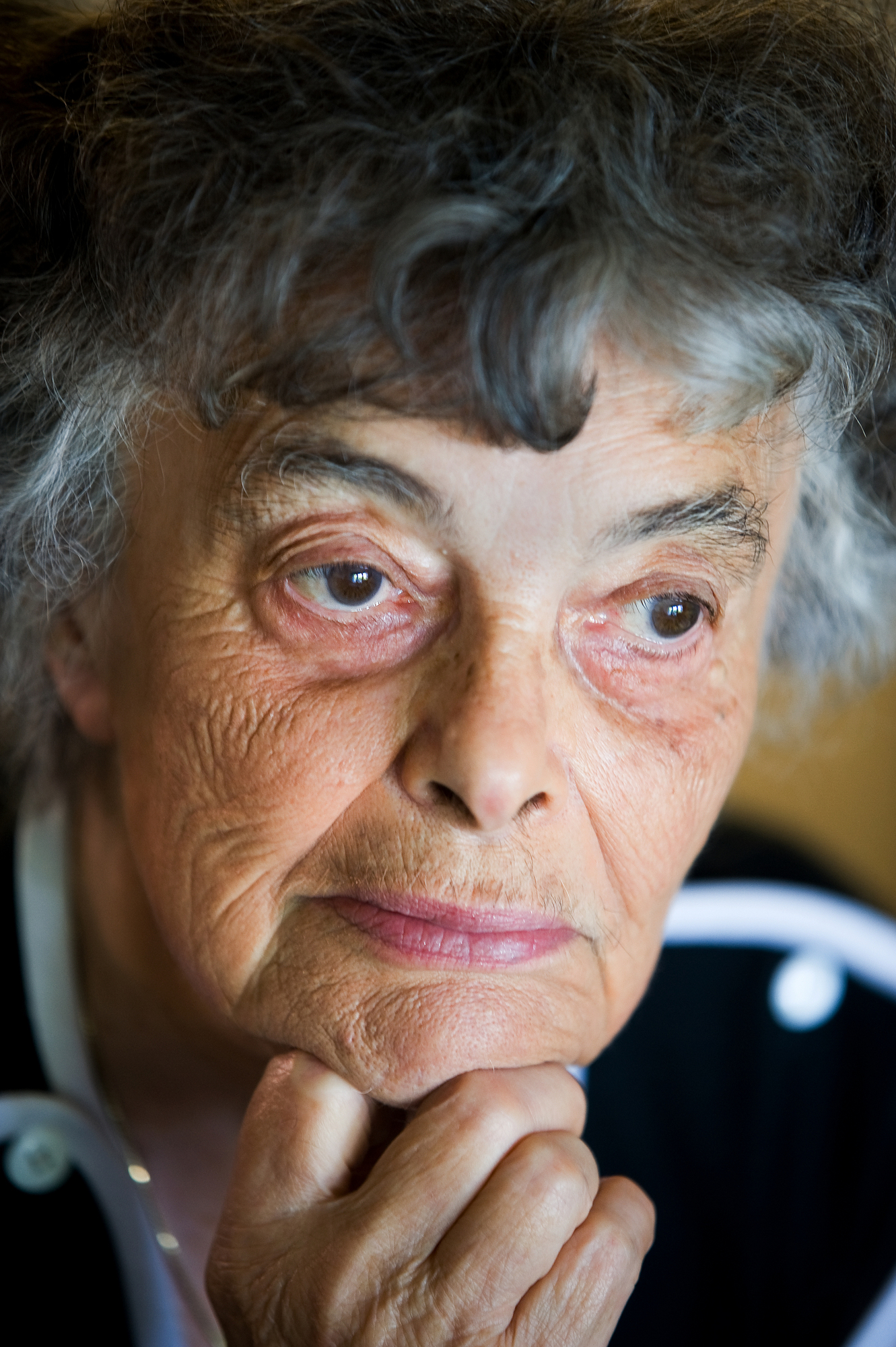
Iva Drapalova was the fifteenth recipient of the HRE Citizenship Award.

Iva Drápalová refused to cooperate with the StB, the Communist secret police, even when she and her family were threatened. In 1968 she started working for the Associated Press bureau in Prague when, following the crushing of the Prague Spring, nobody else wanted the job. Initially she only agreed to help out as a translator for one week. Two years later she had become AP's Prague correspondent. After she retired in 1988 she was a translator at Velvet Revolution press conferences and later she worked as a consultant for the L.A. Times.

==== Financial component donated to Štěpán Ripka ====
The financial part of Iva Drápalová was given to Štěpán Ripka as the recipient of the monetary part of her award. Štěpán Ripka is a social researcher and policy analyst who studies Roma communities, advises the Open Society Institute and the Czech Government he also chairs the Platform for Social Housing and pursues a PhD in social anthropology at Charles University in Prague.

=== Sixteenth – Tony Fitzjohn and Souad Mekhennet ===
Tony Fitzjohn was a conservationist who worked extensively with George Adamson (of "Born Free" fame) and ran a successful sanctuary for rhinos and African wild dogs in Mkomazi National Park in Tanzania. Fitzjohn left for Africa in his early twenties and immediately fell in love with the continent. He spent 18 years in Kora in northern Kenya releasing lions and other big cats back into the wild. In the late 1980s he was invited by Tanzanian government to help to establish a new national park in the area that was then Mkomazi Game Reserve. He led the building of the infrastructure and later established and stocked the first successful rhinoceros sanctuary in Tanzania for which he developed dedicated anti-poaching units. He emphasized the close cooperation with neighboring communities, and developed special programmes that allow local children and students to visit Mkomazi National Park and a rhino sanctuary.

The Sanctuary provides local communities with clean water supplies, dispensary and Flying Doctor services - with the notable achievement of completing construction of a new secondary school for 400 children. In 2006, Tony Fitzjohn was recognized as an Officer of the Order of the British Empire for his life-time commitment to conservation. He died of cancer at 76 in 2022.

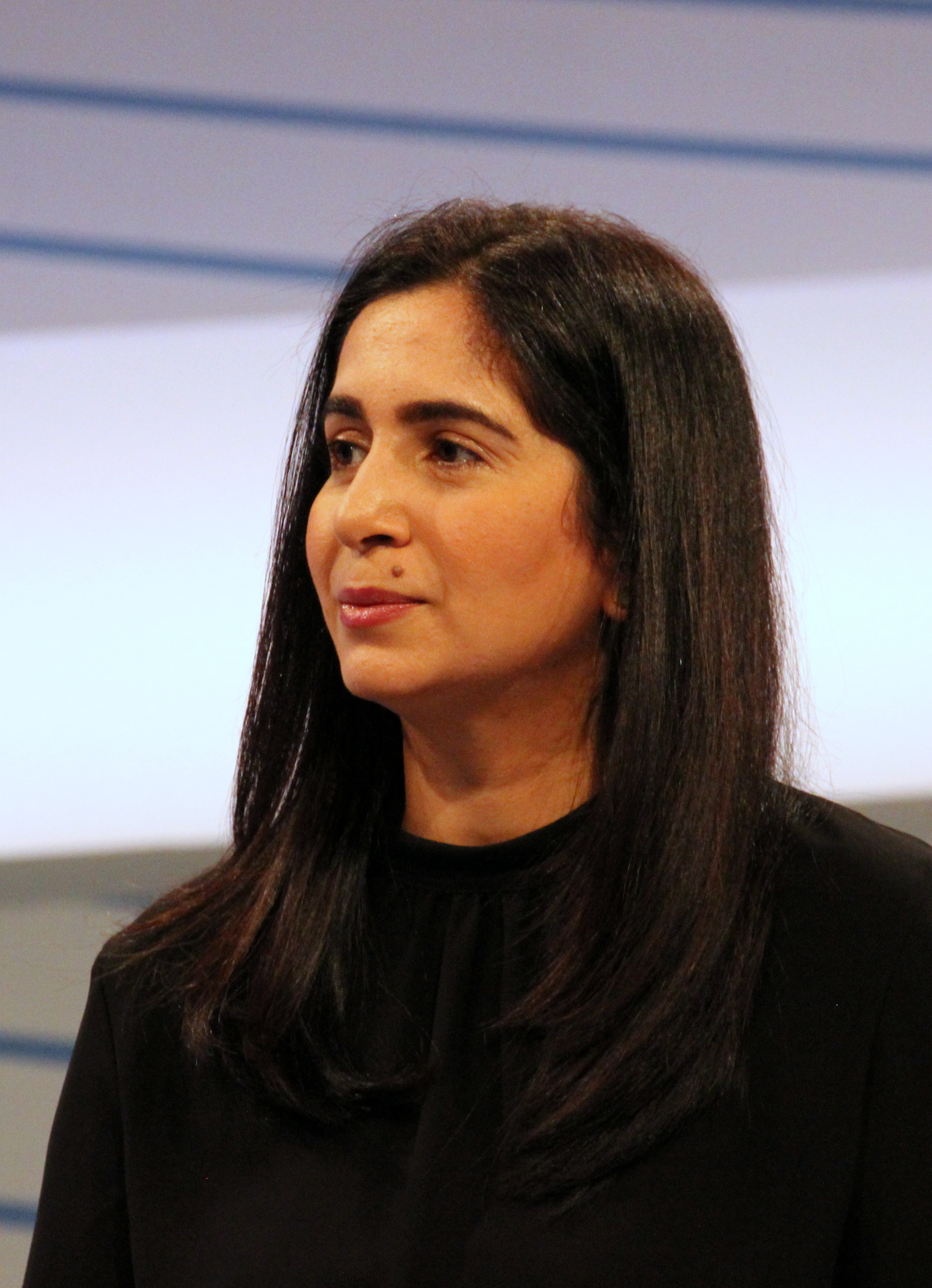
Souad Mekhennet was the sixteenth recipient of the HRE Citizenship Award.

Souad Mekhennet has long been recognized for her coverage of the Arabic-speaking world - especially women's issues. She was born in Germany - the daughter of a Turkish mother and Moroccan father. She studied international relations, political science, sociology, psychology and history at the University of Frankfurt. She also attended the Henri-Nannen School of Journalism in Hamburg, later taking courses at the City University of New York - School of Journalism. That led to her career as a reporter for The New York Times. Since shortly after 11 September, she has been reporting about radical Islamic movements. Her articles tell stories of hope, fear and the real life of Muslims throughout the world as Muslim countries undergo dramatic and traumatic changes. Currently she is a moderator and public speaker and works for The Washington Post, German TV channel ZDF and The Daily Beast. Mekhennet has been interviewed for various TV and radio shows in the US and Europe. She is a visiting fellow at the Weatherhead Centre at Harvard University, and at the School for Advanced and International Studies (SAIS), at Johns Hopkins University. Under great threat to herself, Mekhennet has continued to pursue the plight of peoples in conflict zones.

==== Financial component donated to Praunheimer Werkstätten and Arthur F. Sniegon ====
The financial parts were divided as Souad Mekhennet nominated organizations Praunheimer Werkstätten (working with challenged people) and Die Weisser Ring (Helping the victims of crimes), Tony Fitzjohn nominated Arthur F. Sniegon which is an aspiring conservationist from Czech Republic.

=== Seventeenth – Magda Vášáryová and Zdeněk Tůma ===
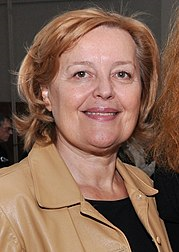
Magda Vášáryová was the sixteenth recipient of the HRE Citizenship Award.

Magda Vášáryová born 26 August—of mixed German, Hungarian and Slovak origins - is known for being one of Czechoslovakia's great actresses. Vaclav Havel wanted her to become the Vice President of democratic Czechoslovakia after 1989 - but she declined. In 1999, she became the first female presidential candidate in Slovakia. In 1971 she completed her studies at Bratislava's Comenius University. Until 1989, she acted in several theaters including the Slovak National Theatre after a long movies career. She was the Ambassador of Czechoslovakia in Austria (1990– 1993). After the split of Czechia and Slovakia, she became Ambassador to Poland (2000–2005). From February 2005 to July 2006 she held the position of State Secretary of the Ministry of Foreign Affairs of Slovakia. In the 2006 parliamentary elections, she was elected to the National Council of the Slovak Republic for Slovak Democratic and Christian Union - Democratic Party. She spent here entire career fighting Communism and corruption.

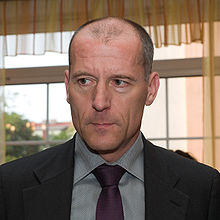
Zdeněk Tůma received the 18th HRE Citizenship Award.

Zdeněk Tůma (born České Budějovice, 1960) was Governor of the Czech Central Bank for 10 years. He graduated from the University of Economics, Prague, later finishing his postgraduate studies at the Czechoslovak Academy of Sciences. He was the Chief Economist at Patria Finance Investment Bank in the 90's. In 1998 he moved to the European Bank for Reconstruction and Development where he became a member of the Executive Board. In early 1999, Tuma was appointed Vice-Governor of the Czech National Bank. In December 2000, he was made Governor which he held until 2010. In this capacity he sat on the Boards of the European Central Bank, International Monetary Fund, and Bank for International Settlement. He is currently a partner in KPMG Czech Republic. He is an external Lecturer at the Institute of Economic Studies of Charles University, where he covers monetary policy and financial regulation. He is a member of the Scientific Boards of the Czech Technical University (CVUT) and the University of South Bohemia. He is on the Statutory Boards of the Prague-based Academy of Performing Arts, the University of Economics and CERGE-EI Foundation. He is on the Board of Governors of English College and the Supervisory Board of Výbor dobré vůle – Foundation of Olga Havlová. He was the president of the Czech Economic Society from 1999 to 2001. During his tenure, Tuma was consistently recognized as one of the World's top-ten Central Bankers.

Financial component donated to Petr Koukal and Živena

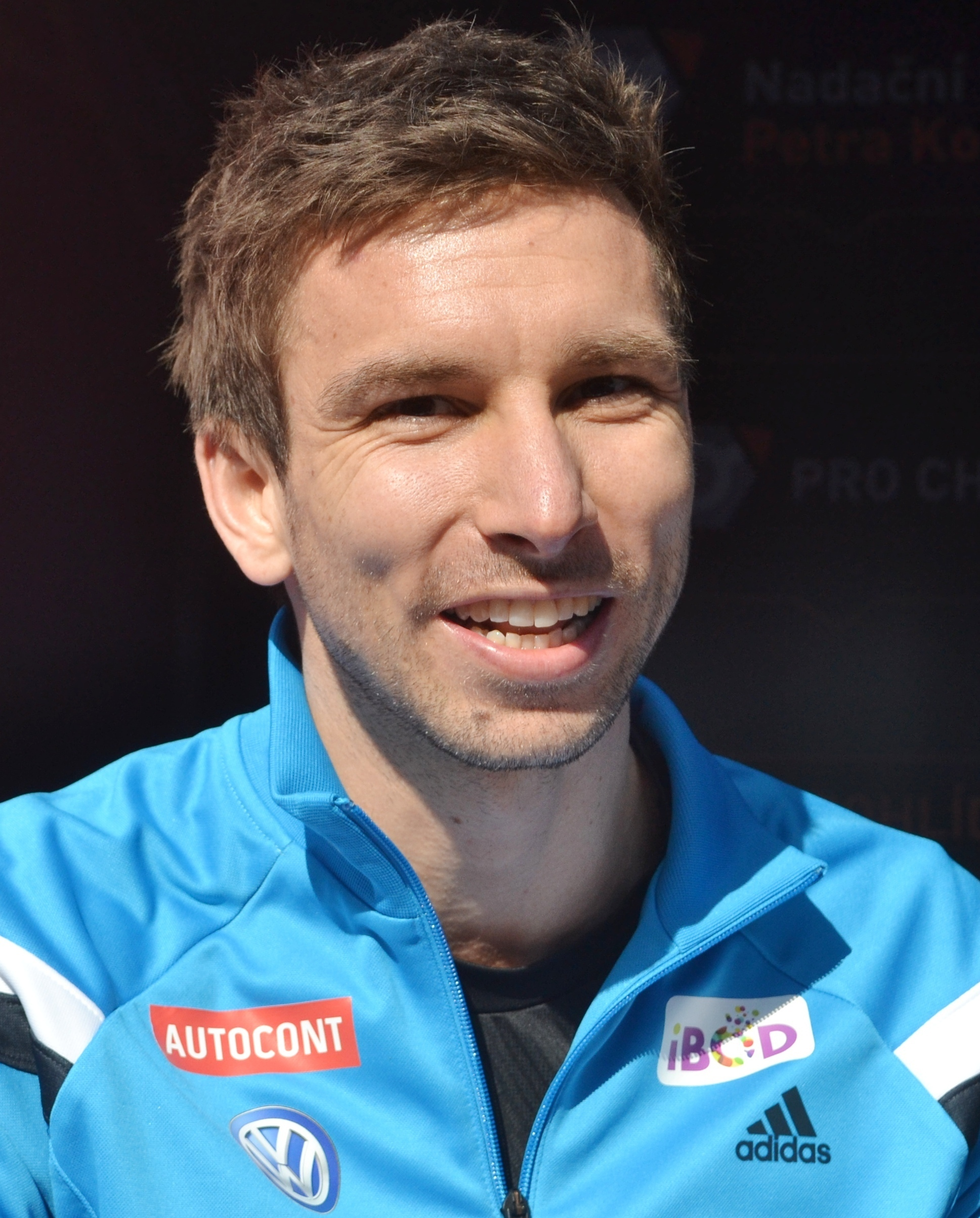
Petr Koukal and Živena were the 14th financial recipient of the HRE Citizenship Award.

The financial part was divided into 2 parts as Magda Vášáryova has chosen the oldest women organization in Europe - Živena and its activity towards females from the Roma community in Slovakia and Zdeněk Tuma has chosen Petr Koukal (badminton), Czech Olympic winner and his foundation which is helping men with testicle cancer.

=== Eighteenth – The Santa Marta Group and its president, Cardinal Vincent Nichols ===
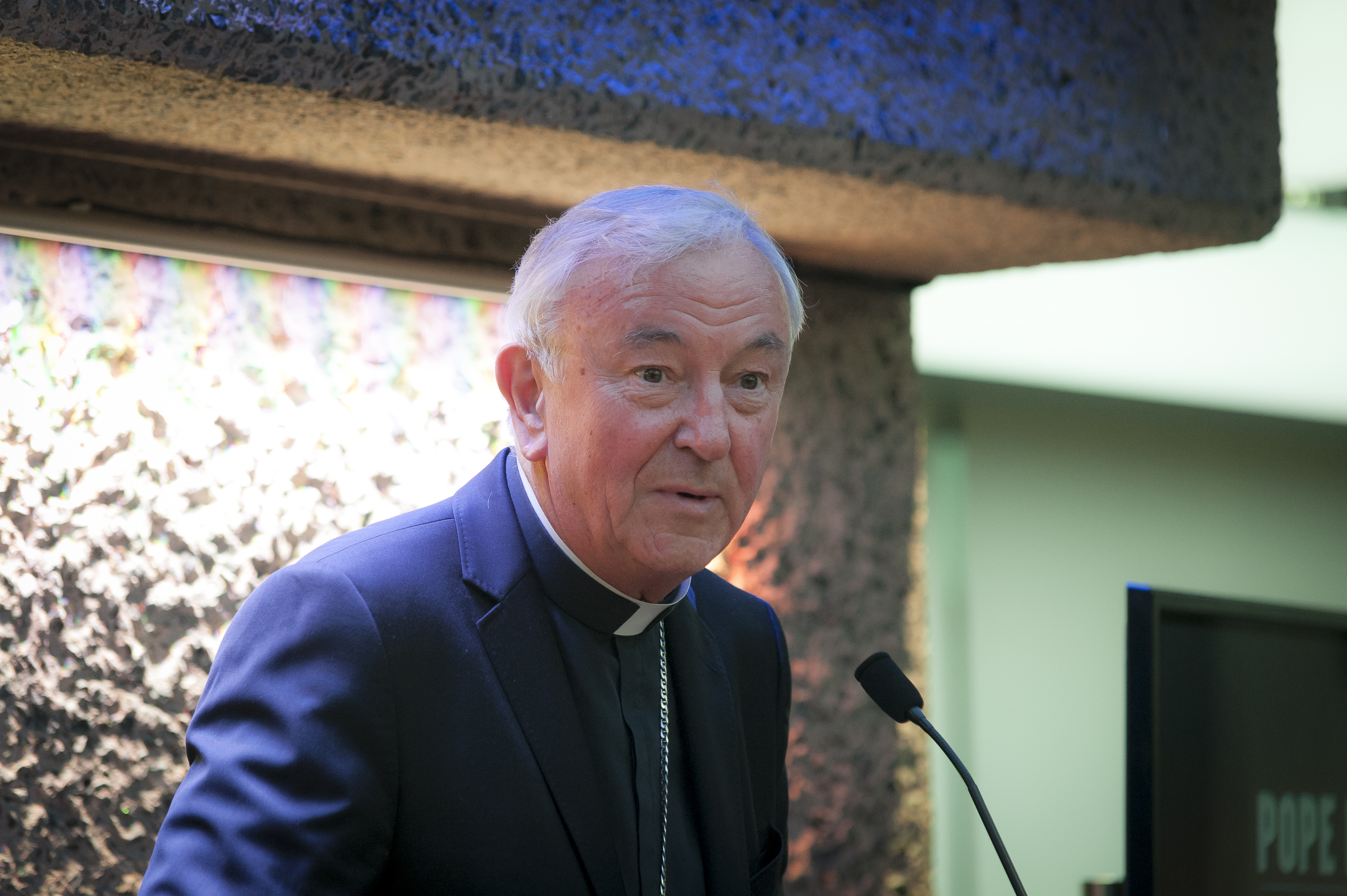
Cardinal Vincent Nichols was the seventeenth recipient of HRE Citizenship Award.

The Santa Marta Group combats modern slavery and human trafficking globally. In particular it focuses on bringing together the heads of national and international police and law enforcement agencies along with international organisations to look at how they can work with the Catholic Church to help victims. The Santa Marta Group is named after the home of Pope Francis and was initiated by the Catholic Bishops' Conference for England and Wales. It was established in Rome in 2014 when police chiefs and Catholic bishops came together in the presence of Pope Francis. Cardinal Vincent Nichols is the president of the Santa Marta Group, Archbishop of Westminster and President of the Catholic Bishops' Conference of England and Wale. Modern slavery is one of the gravest criminal challenges confronting the international community. The scale of the problem is such that now, according to some studies, it ranks as the second most profitable worldwide criminal enterprise after the illegal arms trade. This exploitation can take many forms including forced labour, sexual exploitation, domestic servitude, forced criminality and organ harvesting. Both Pope Benedict and Pope Francis continually drew the attention of the Church and wider world to the moral and human crisis evident in this widespread human exploit

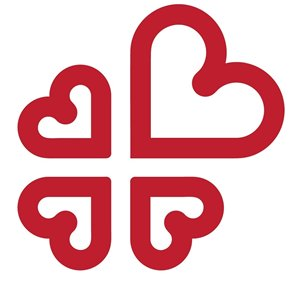
Secondary Recipient Caritas Bakhita House

==== Financial part donated to Caritas Bakhita House ====
Cardinal Vincent Nicols intends to donate the money from the award to Caritas Bakhita House in the Diocese of Westminster for their work to help victims of trafficking get back on their feet, whether they wish to return home or find suitability in this country.

=== "Special Commemorative Award" to Ján Kuciak & Martina Kušnírová (Slovakia) and Tom Nicholson (Canada) ===
Ján Kuciak and Martina Kušnírová received a Special Commemorative Award for their courageous commitment to Kuciak's work as an investigative reporter. The couple were murdered in their home in February 2018 in an attempt to silence them. Kuciak, in his work, focused on politically related fraud. At the time of his death he had been working on a story on the influence of the Calabrian mafia, the 'Ndrangheta,' on business and politics in Slovakia.

The murders caused mass protests and a lasting political crisis in Slovakia. They led to the resignation of the prime minister and his cabinet, as well as the head of police. At the time of writing no one has been charged with the murders.

Tom Nicholson is an investigative journalist who has covered Slovakia for the past 20 years. He was editor-in-chief at the Slovak Spectator and head of investigative reporting at the SME daily. Later he worked for the weekly Trend.

He is best known for making public the "Gorilla" scandal in Slovakia in 2012. 'Gorilla' is considered by many the biggest corruption story in Slovak history. It is named after a Slovak Secret Service wiretap file which alleges massive fraud at the highest level of Slovak politics and business. It exposed politicians, public officials and business representatives discussing kickbacks in return for procurement and privatization contracts and rocked the Slovak political scene.

Nicholson lives in Canada and is finishing a book on ties between politics and organized crime.

=== Nineteenth – Ivan M. Havel and Ivan Chvatik ===
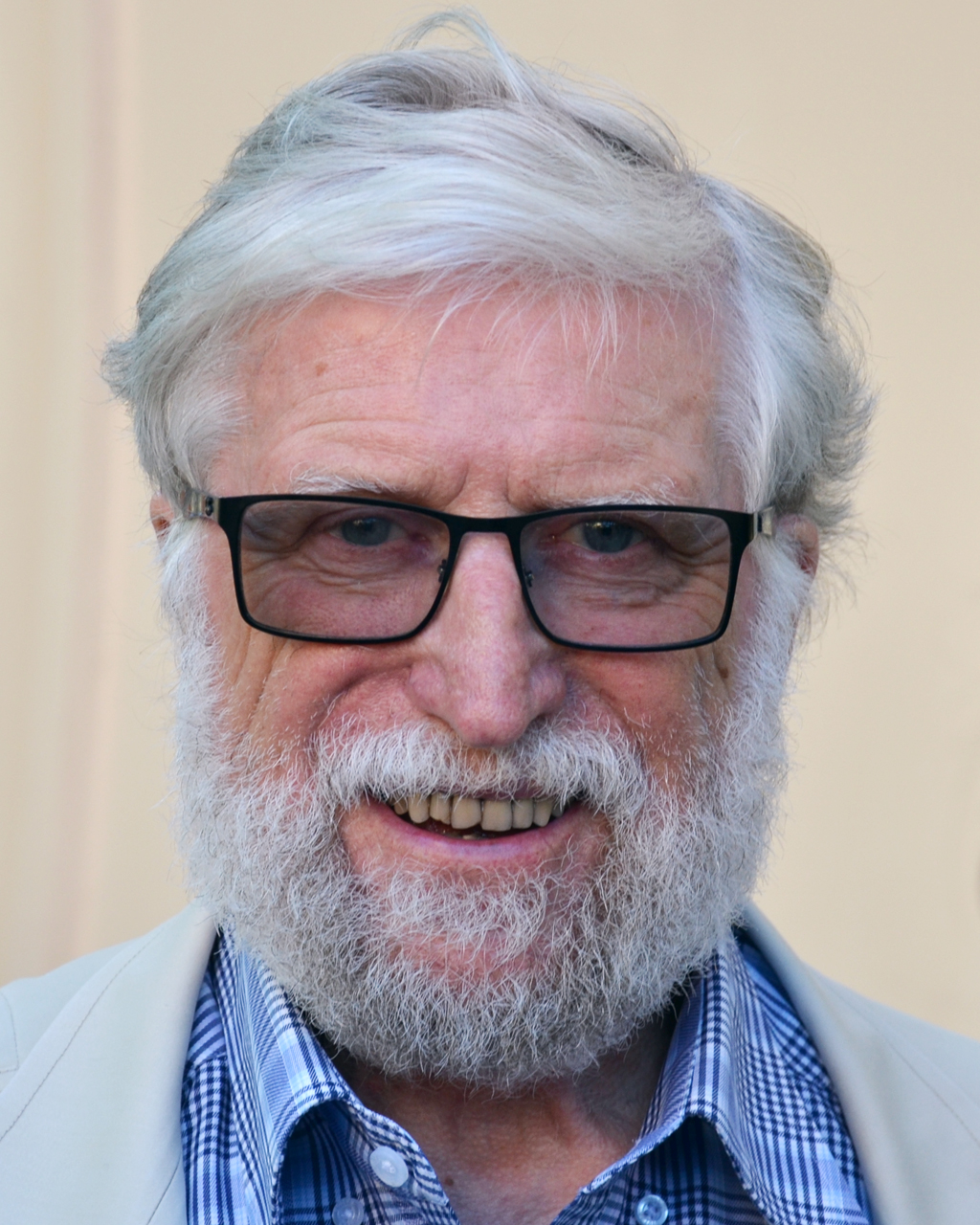
Ivan M. Havel was the nineteenth recipient of the HRE Citizenship Award.

Born in 1938, Ivan Havel was a dissident and one of the outstanding figures of the scientific community in the Czech Republic of the past decades. He dedicated his life to academics and research in the field of computer science. After leaving Czechoslovakia in 1969 for doctoral studies at the University of California, Berkeley, not many believed that he would ever come back. Before the communist regime collapsed in 1989, he was engaged in semi-official scientific work and often hosted discussion groups inviting dissidents and academics in his apartment overlooking the River Vltava in Prague. He also cooperated with samizdat editions, for which he was harassed and briefly detained on several occasions by the StB. After the Velvet Revolution he decided to distance himself from politics and turned his focus to science and academia. He later co-founded the Center of Theoretical Studies (jointly with Ivan Chvatik) in Prague and held the position of Editor-in-Chief of the esteemed scientific journal Vesmír for over two decades. He was a member of Academia Europaea and several other professional societies, and served on boards of various academic institutions and cultural foundations.

Ivan Chvatík was born in Olomouc on 15 September 1941. He graduated in nuclear physics from the Czech Technical University in Prague. After being briefly employed at the Department of Logic at Aritma, he worked for more than twenty years as the head of the Technical Department of the Computer Centre of the Machine Technology Factories in Prague (1967-1989). He was in charge of the Swedish computer Datasaab, which he mastered, allowing him to demand and receive flexible working hours. That gave him enough time to focus on philosophy, to which he was mainly introduced by Jan Patočka. From autumn 1968 Chavtik attended Patočka's lectures at the Faculty of Arts of Charles University, and a year later he became Patočka's external research candidate. When Patočka was forced to leave the faculty in 1972. After Patočka's death in March 1977, he and his friends saved the philosophers writings, which they gradually worked on releasing in samizdat. They managed to publish 27 volumes in blue binding, now called the Archival Series of Jan Patočka's Works, before the Velvet Revolution.

=== Twentieth – Hans-Dietrich Genscher and Markus Meckel ===
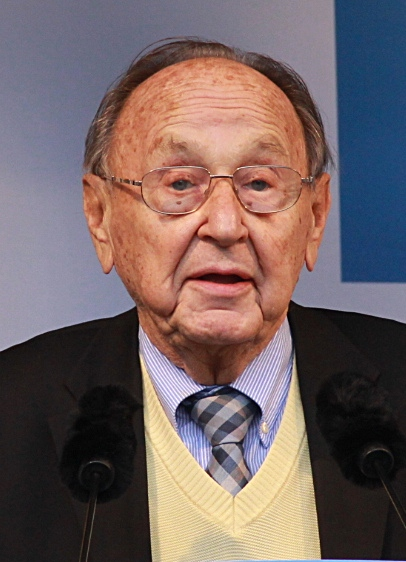
Hans-Dietrich Genscher is the twentieth recipient of the HRE Citizenship Award.

Born on 21 March 1927, Hans-Dietrich Genscher was a German politician of the liberal Free Democratic Party (FDP). He served as Foreign Minister and Vice Chancellor of Germany from 1974 to 1992, making him the longest-tenured holder of either post. Amongst many of his achievements, he is greatly respected for his significant efforts that helped spell the end of the Cold War in the late 1980s, when Communist eastern European governments toppled leading to German reunification. During his time in office, he focused on maintaining stability and balance between the West and the Soviet bloc. From the beginning, he argued that the West should seek cooperation with Communist governments rather than treat them as implacably hostile. In 1991, he played a pivotal role in international diplomacy surrounding the breakup of Yugoslavia by successfully pushing for international recognition of Croatia, Slovenia and other republics declaring independence. After leaving office, he worked as a lawyer and international consultant. Genscher died at his home outside Bonn in Wachtberg on 31 March 2016, one week and three days after his 89th birthday. The HRE Award will be received by his widow Barbara Genscher.

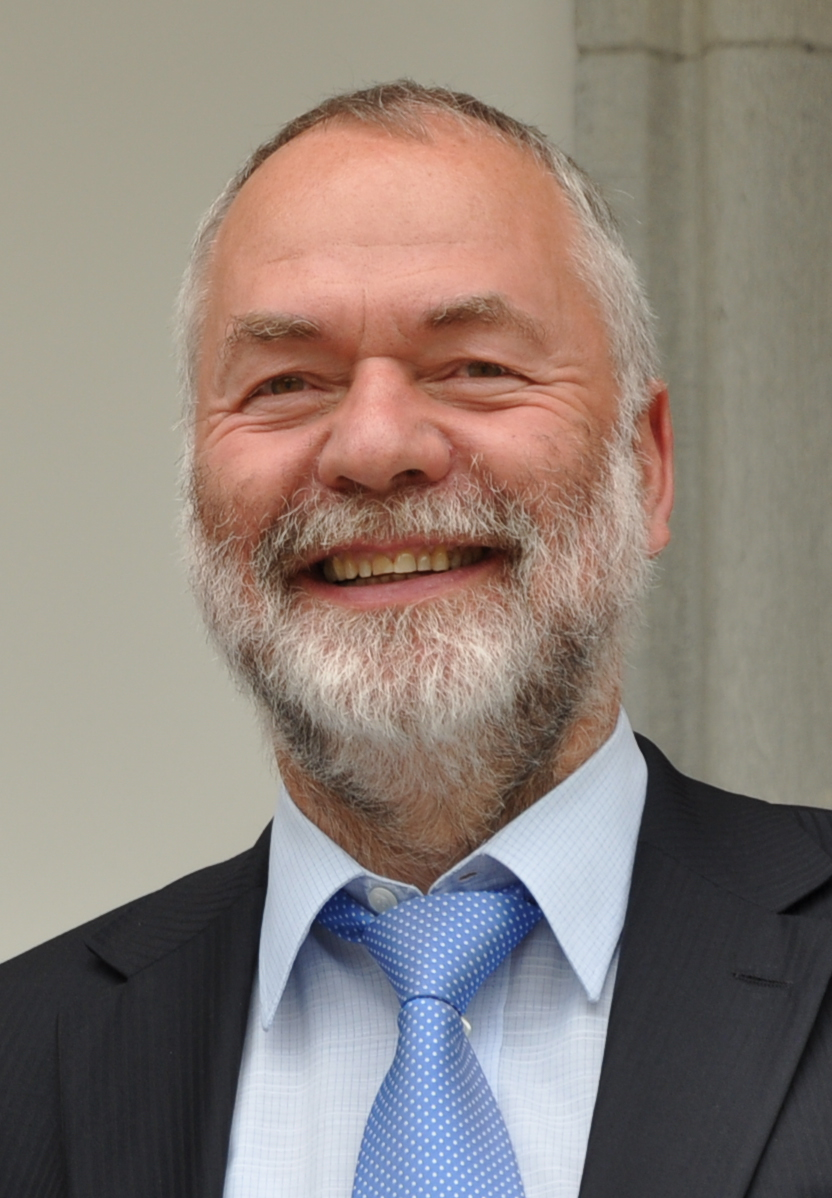
Markus Meckel is also the twentieth recipient of the HRE Citizenship Award.

Markus Meckel is a theologian and politician who was involved with the opposition in the German Democratic Republic (GDR) from the 1970s. During the last phase of the East-German state, he co-founded the Social Democratic Party in the GDR, which later transformed into the Social Democratic Party of Germany, one of the two major parties in the country today. Just before the dissolution of the GDR, he became its first democratically elected Foreign Minister. As member of the German Bundestag (1990-2009), he focused on European politics, security issues and Eastern Partnership. He was Vice-Spokesman of the Social Democrats for foreign policy and Spokesman in two commissions dealing with the SED dictatorship and its consequences. Serving as President of the German War Graves Commission from 2013 to 2016, he has been an advocate for the remembrance of the casualties of war by conserving cemeteries and organizing international work camps for young people. Currently Mr. Meckel is chairman of the Council of the Federal Foundation for the Reappraisal of the SED Dictatorship, co-chairman of the Council of the Foundation for German-Polish Cooperation and member of the Advisory Board of European Network Remembrance and Solidarity.

=== Twenty-first – Ivo Josipović ===
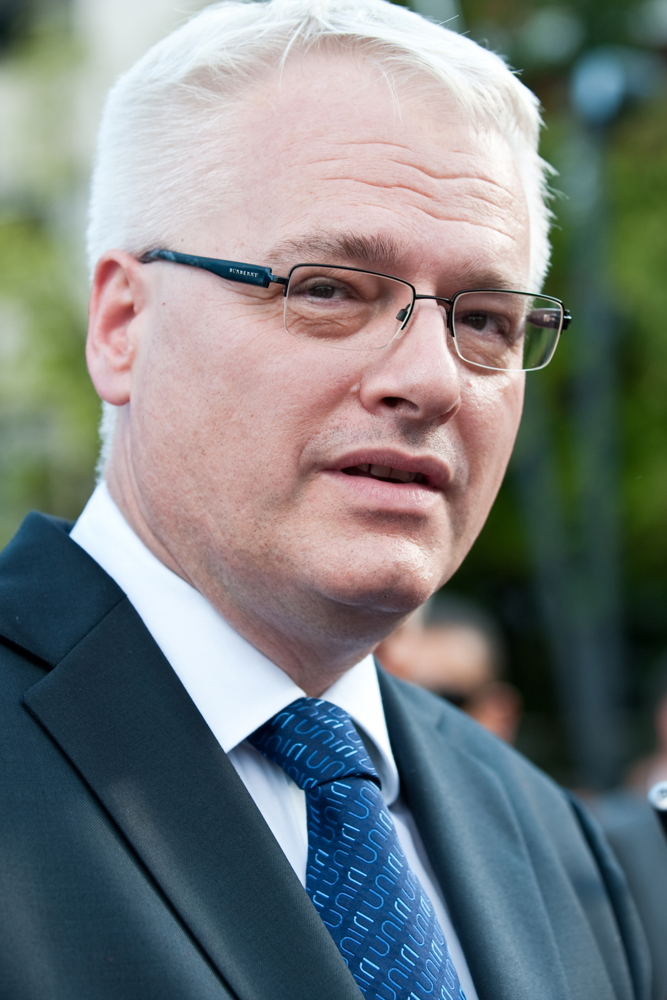
Ivo Josipović is the twenty-first recipient of the HRE Citizenship Award.

Born on 28. August 1957, Ivo Josipović was President of Croatia from 2010-2015. He gained prominence by working reconciliation between the factions of former Yugoslavia. He has worked as a university professor, legal expert, musician, and composer. He holds a Ph.D. in Law and advanced degrees in music composition. In 2003 he won a seat in the Croatian Parliament running as an independent candidate on the SDP party list. He won re-election to parliament as a member of the SDP in 2007 Titled "Nova pravednost" (New Justice). His presidential campaign called for a new legal framework to address deep social injustice, corruption, and organized crime. Ivo Josipović was inaugurated on 18 February 2010, at St. Mark's Square in Zagreb. Some 50 compositions for various ensembles (symphonic orchestra, chamber orchestra, soloists) have been composed by him, which are performed by eminent Croatian and foreign artists. His professional interest focuses on criminal law, criminal procedure, misdemeanors, international criminal law, war crimes, international courts & tribunals, human rights, the fight against corruption and organized crime. During his presidency, he led the Republic of Croatia to become a member of the European Union.

=== Twenty-second – Ma Thida ===
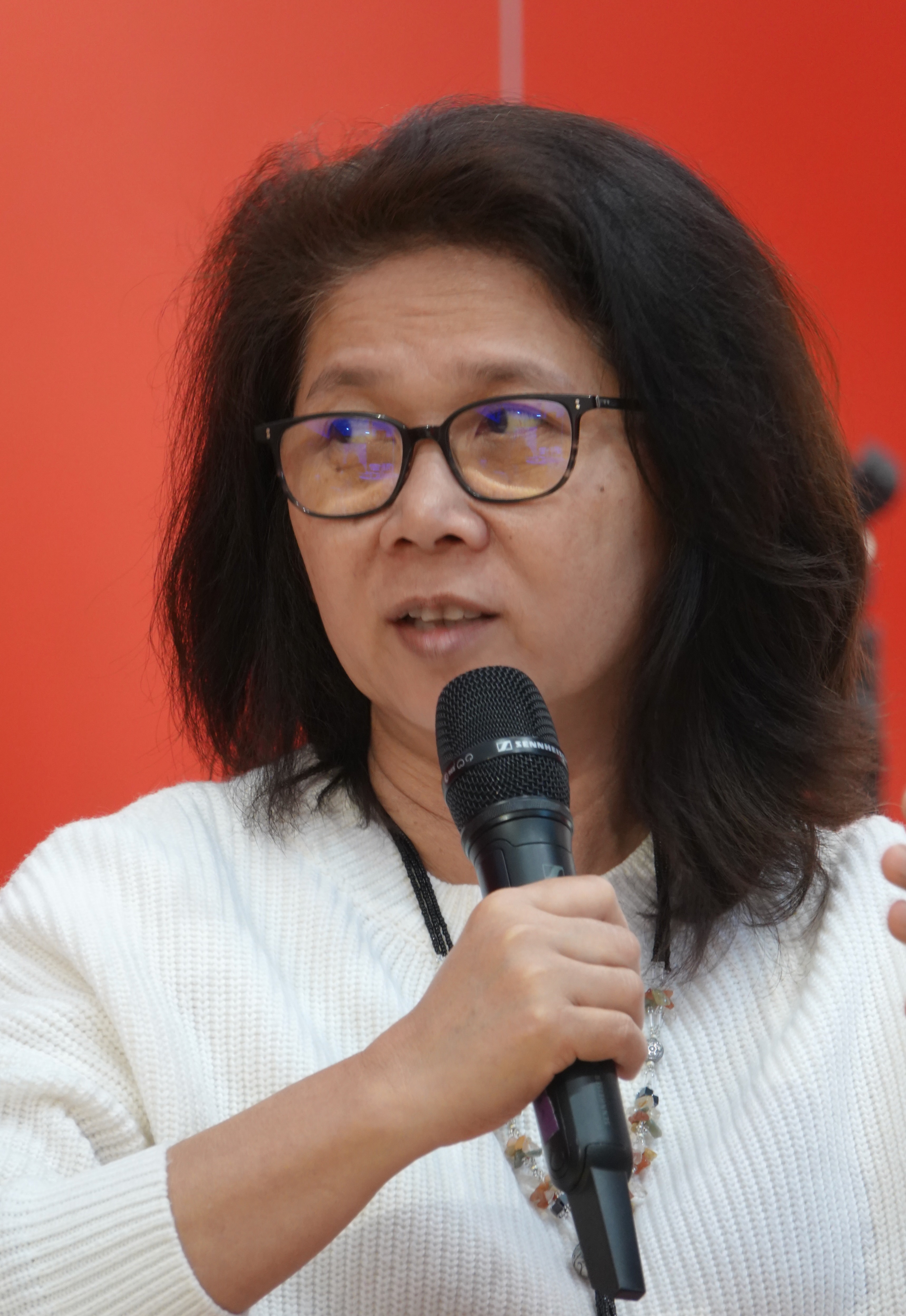
Ma Thida is the twenty-second recipient of the HRE Citizenship Award.

Ma Thida, a Burmese human rights activist, surgeon, writer, and former prisoner of conscience, was arrested in October 1994 and sentenced to 20 years in Insein Prison on charges of "endangering public peace, having contact with illegal organizations, and distributing unlawful literature." Despite being the recipient of the PEN/Barbara Goldsmith Freedom to Write Award in 1996, she was not released until 1999, having served six years in harsh conditions. Her release was granted on humanitarian grounds, partly due to her declining health, international pressure, and advocacy from human rights organizations such as Amnesty International and the PEN network. Turning to the Buddhist meditation technique of Vipassana during her incarceration, she developed a reluctance to harbor resentment towards the regime for imprisoning her. She believes her prison experiences contributed to gaining recognition for her writing. Until 2016, Ma Thida served as president of PEN Myanmar, an organization dedicated to monitoring freedom of expression issues. Released only in Burma in 1999, her first book, "The Sunflower," had been banned internationally in the early 1990s upon its release.

=== Twenty-third – Yevgeniya Chirikova ===
Yevgeniya Chirikova is a prominent Russian activist, based in Estonia since 2015. Chirikova was primarily known for opposing the building of a motorway through Khimki Forest near Moscow. She managed to upgrade this local campaign to an environmental movement of national scale. Later Chirikova played a prominent role in the 2011–2013 Russian protests following disputed parliamentary elections in Russia. In recent years, Chirikova has advocated for aid to Ukraine focusing on support of Ukrainian civilian prisoners and Russian regiments fighting within the Ukrainian military forces. The Kremlin have initiated several criminal lawsuits against Chirikova labelling her as a "foreign agent", an "extremist" and a "terrorist". On 19 November 2024, she received the 23rd Hanno R. Ellenbogen Citizenship Award.

=== Twenty-fourth – Milan Kňažko ===
Milan Kňažko, born in 1945 in Horné Plachtinice, has had a varied career, starting as a theatre stage technician and miner before rising to fame as a film and television actor. He studied at the National Academy of Arts in Bratislava and performed with the Slovak National Theatre. Politically active, Kňažko co-founded Public Against Violence, the first democratic party after the 1989 revolution, and later helped establish the Movement for a Democratic Slovakia (HZDS), which he left in 1993 when Vladimir Mečiar became leader. Kňažko served as an advisor to Czech President Václav Havel and was a deputy in the Czechoslovak Parliament. After Slovakia's independence in 1993, he held roles in the Slovak government, including as a minister without portfolio, vice-chairman of the Cabinet, and briefly as Foreign Minister in 1994. He has been a parliamentary deputy for the Democratic Union, now part of the SDK coalition, and served as Minister of Culture in 1998–2002. On 19 November 2024, he received the 24th Hanno R. Ellenbogen Citizenship Award.

=== Twenty-fifth – Cardinal Dominik Duka ===
Dominik Jaroslav Duka, born in 1943, is a prominent Czech Catholic leader who served as Archbishop of Prague from 2010 to 2022 and became a cardinal in 2012. Duka's early life was shaped by challenges; his father, an army officer, was imprisoned under Czechoslovakia's communist regime. Ordained as a Dominican priest in 1970, Duka faced restrictions when his priestly authorization was revoked in 1975, forcing him to work secretly in ministry and at the Škoda factory. He was briefly imprisoned in the 1980s due to his involvement in underground religious activities. In 1998, Duka became Bishop of Hradec Králové, later appointed Archbishop of Prague by Pope Benedict XVI. He advocated for the restitution of church property seized during communism and presided over the funeral of Václav Havel in 2011. Pope Francis accepted his resignation as Archbishop of Prague in May 2022, concluding a notable tenure. On 19 November 2024, he received the 25th Hanno R. Ellenbogen Citizenship Award.
