= The Journal of Entrepreneurial Finance =

- Discipline: Finance, entrepreneurship
- Language: English
- Edited by: James C. Brau

Publication details
- Former names: The Journal of Small Business Finance, The Journal of Entrepreneurial and Small Business Finance, The Journal of Entrepreneurial Finance and Business Ventures
- History: 1991-present
- Publisher: Pepperdine University (United States)
- Frequency: Biannually
- Open access: Yes

Standard abbreviations
- ISO 4: J. Entrep. Finance

Indexing
- ISSN: 2373-1753 (print); 2373-1761 (web)
- LCCN: 2014202568
- OCLC no.: 880432695

Links
- Journal homepage

The Journal of Entrepreneurial Finance is a biannual peer-reviewed open-access academic journal published by Pepperdine University. It was established in 1991 as The Journal of Small Business Finance. From 1996 to 2000 it had the title The Journal of Entrepreneurial and Small Business Finance with Bill Petty (Baylor University) as the editor. In 2001, the journal was renamed The Journal of Entrepreneurial Finance with Jacky So (Southern Illinois University) as the editor. From 2002 to 2007 the journal was housed at Syracuse University under the name The Journal of Entrepreneurial Finance and Business Ventures with Allan Young as editor. Since 2008 The editor-in-chief has been James C. Brau (Brigham Young University). The journal covers topics related to finance, entrepreneurship, new ventures, and small business finance. It is abstracted and indexed in ProQuest databases, EconPapers, Cabell's International, and RePEc.
