= James C. Brau =

American economist

- Born: February 6, 1969 (age 57); Freeport, Bahamas
- Education: United States Military Academy (B.S.); Florida State University (Ph.D.)
- Occupation: Finance Professor at the Marriott School of Management at Brigham Young University

James Carl Brau (born February 6, 1969) is an American economist, focusing in issues pertaining to initial public offerings, entrepreneurial finance, and real estate, currently the Joel C. Peterson Professor of Finance at Marriott School of Management, Brigham Young University.

== Education ==
Brau is a 1991 graduate of the United States Military Academy. While serving in the guard and reserves, he earned a PhD in finance and business administration at Florida State University. His doctoral thesis was entitled Three essays on the going public process.

== Career ==
Brau was hired by Brigham Young University in 1999. He was promoted to associate professor after six years at BYU and then to full professor after an additional six. He is currently the Joel C. Peterson Professor of Finance. He is also the Editor-in-Chief of The Journal of Entrepreneurial Finance. He earned the Chartered Financial Analyst designation in 2004 and the Certified Financial Planner designation in 2019.

Brau is a weightlifter and has competed in amateur bodybuilding shows. He has been married since 1991 and has four children. Brau was raised as a Roman Catholic and converted to the Church of Jesus Christ of Latter-day Saints in 1990 while a cadet at West Point. He has served in many leadership positions in the church.
