= Yuri Schmidt =

Russian human rights lawyer

Yuri Markovich Schmidt (Russian: Ю́рий Ма́ркович Шмидт; 10 May 1937 – 12 January 2013) was a Russian human rights lawyer.

Schmidt was born in Leningrad. He was a member of the Mikhail Khodorkovsky defense team from 2004, and headed the legal team for several years. He died of cancer in 2013, aged 75, in St. Petersburg.

== Early life ==
Yuri Schmidt was born in Leningrad on May 10, 1937, while the USSR was going through the period of the Stalinist great purge. His father, declared as the "enemy of the people", was imprisoned in the gulag for 19 years shortly after Schmidt was born. Schmidt began studying law and graduated from Saint Petersburg State University in 1960.

== Career ==
He was not one of the lawyers considered "reliable" by the regime and pleaded in criminal proceedings for 30 years. In 1986, Schmidt was struck off the bar association. After pleading his case, he was reinstated a year later.

He began representing prisoners charged with political crimes in the late 1980s. His clients included jailed leaders of political independence movements in the ethnic enclaves of Nagorno-Karabakh and South Ossetia, a journalist charged with defaming President Islam Karimov of Uzbekistan. His most resounding victory was the acquittal of Aleksandr Nikitin, a former Soviet submarine captain who had been charged with espionage and high treason after he wrote a series of reports detailing radioactive pollution by Russia’s navy. He was a member of the Mikhail Khodorkovsky defense team from 2004, and headed the legal team for several years.
