= Heidelberg High School =

Heidelberg American High School (HAHS)

Location
- Mark Twain Village; Heidelberg; Germany; 49°23′27″N 8°41′00″E

Information
- School type: Department of Defense Dependents Schools
- Established: 20 October 1946
- Status: Closed
- Closed: June 2013
- Grades: 9–12
- Colors: Blue and gold
- Mascot: Lions
- Website: web.archive.org/web/20061019093410/http://www.heid-hs.eu.dodea.edu/

Heidelberg American High School was a school operated by the Department of Defense Dependents Schools (DoDDS) located on the premises of Mark Twain Village, a housing area for American military members and their families in the Südstadt district of Heidelberg, Germany. The school served 9–12 grade students (originally 7–12 until 1976 when Heidelberg Middle School, built for grades 6–8, was built on Patrick Henry Village) and offered a variety of high school courses. In at least 1970–1971, the school served 10-12 grade students only.

Heidelberg High School graduated its final class in 2013. Since 2017, Julius-Springer-Schule has occupied the old Heidelberg High School building at Mark-Twain-Straße 1.

== Media ==
Heidelberg High School was featured in the 21 July 1947 issue of Life magazine.

== Notable alumni ==
- Nina Arianda – actress, graduated from Heidelberg High School in 2002
- Frederic J. Brown III – U.S. Army lieutenant general, graduated from Heidelberg High School in 1952
- Marc S. Ellenbogen – diplomat, philanthropist, president, Prague Society for International Cooperation, graduated from Heidelberg High School in 1981
- Ron George – former NFL linebacker
- Rory Ogle – member of the New Mexico House of Representatives
- William A. Roosma – U.S. Army major general
- Norman Schwarzkopf – commander, Operation Desert Storm attended Heidelberg for a year in 1950
- Elizabeth Vargas – ABC news anchor, graduated from Heidelberg High School in 1980
- Eric Zeier – former quarterback in the NFL, started his career as a freshman at Heidelberg High School, but did not graduate
