= United States Army Garrison Heidelberg =

American military installation in Germany

The U.S. Army Garrison Heidelberg was made up of a number of United States military installations in and around Heidelberg, Germany in the state of Baden-Württemberg, along with Germersheim Depot in the neighboring German state of Rhineland-Palatinate. In addition, some NATO facilities were present on the installations. In June 2010, USAG Heidelberg was inactivated and consolidated into its parent unit, U.S. Army Garrison Baden-Wuerttemberg. This was a preparatory move for a complete relocation away from Heidelberg: From 2012 to 2015 the relocation of all U.S. military units (many to Wiesbaden, Germany) marked an end point in the history of the U.S. Army Garrison Heidelberg. The U.S. Army, Europe (USAREUR) headquarters, located in Heidelberg since 1952 as part of the garrison, was moved to Wiesbaden to a newly built installation at Lucius D. Clay Kaserne in 2012. All military installations in Heidelberg were handed over to the German state by 2015 for conversion to civilian use.

Installations of U.S. Army Garrison Heidelberg included Campbell Barracks (the former Wehrmacht Großdeutschland-Kaserne) where headquarters for several units were located until 2013, including U.S. Army, Europe (USAREUR). Campbell Barracks and Mark Twain Village were both located in Heidelberg-Südstadt; Patton Barracks in nearby Heidelberg-Kirchheim was home to the U.S. Army Garrison Baden-Württemberg. Nachrichten Kaserne in Heidelberg-Rohrbach was home to the former 130th Station Hospital, later designated the Heidelberg Health Center, and Headquarters, Seventh Medical Command (HQ, 7th MEDCOM), which was the parent unit to 264 subordinate US and NATO medical, dental and veterinary units located from Norway to the Mediterranean Sea, from Spain to Germany. Patrick Henry Village, the largest U.S. military housing area in the Heidelberg area, was located west of Heidelberg-Kirchheim. Tompkins Barracks and Kilbourne Kaserne were located in Schwetzingen. The former U.S. Army Air Field (Heidelberg AAF) was later converted to a heliport.

== Former United States military installations in the Heidelberg area ==
- Campbell Barracks (HQ USAREUR) (Heidelberg-Rohrbach)
- Mark Twain Village (Heidelberg-Südstadt)
- Patton Barracks (Heidelberg-Kirchheim)
- Patrick Henry Village (South of Eppelheim, west of Heidelberg-Kirchheim)
- Heidelberg Shopping Center (Southwest of the Heidelberg central train station, German: Hauptbahnhof)
- Tompkins Barracks (Schwetzingen)
- Kilbourne Kaserne (Schwetzingen)
- Nachrichten Kaserne (Heidelberg-Rohrbach)
- Heidelberg Army Airfield (Southeast of Heidelberg-Pfaffengrund, northwest of Heidelberg-Kirchheim)
- Hammonds Barracks (Mannheim-Seckenheim)

== See also ==
- List of United States Army installations in Germany
