= Mark Twain Village =

Quarter of Heidelberg, Baden-Württemberg, Germany

Coordinates: 49°23′11″N 8°41′5″E

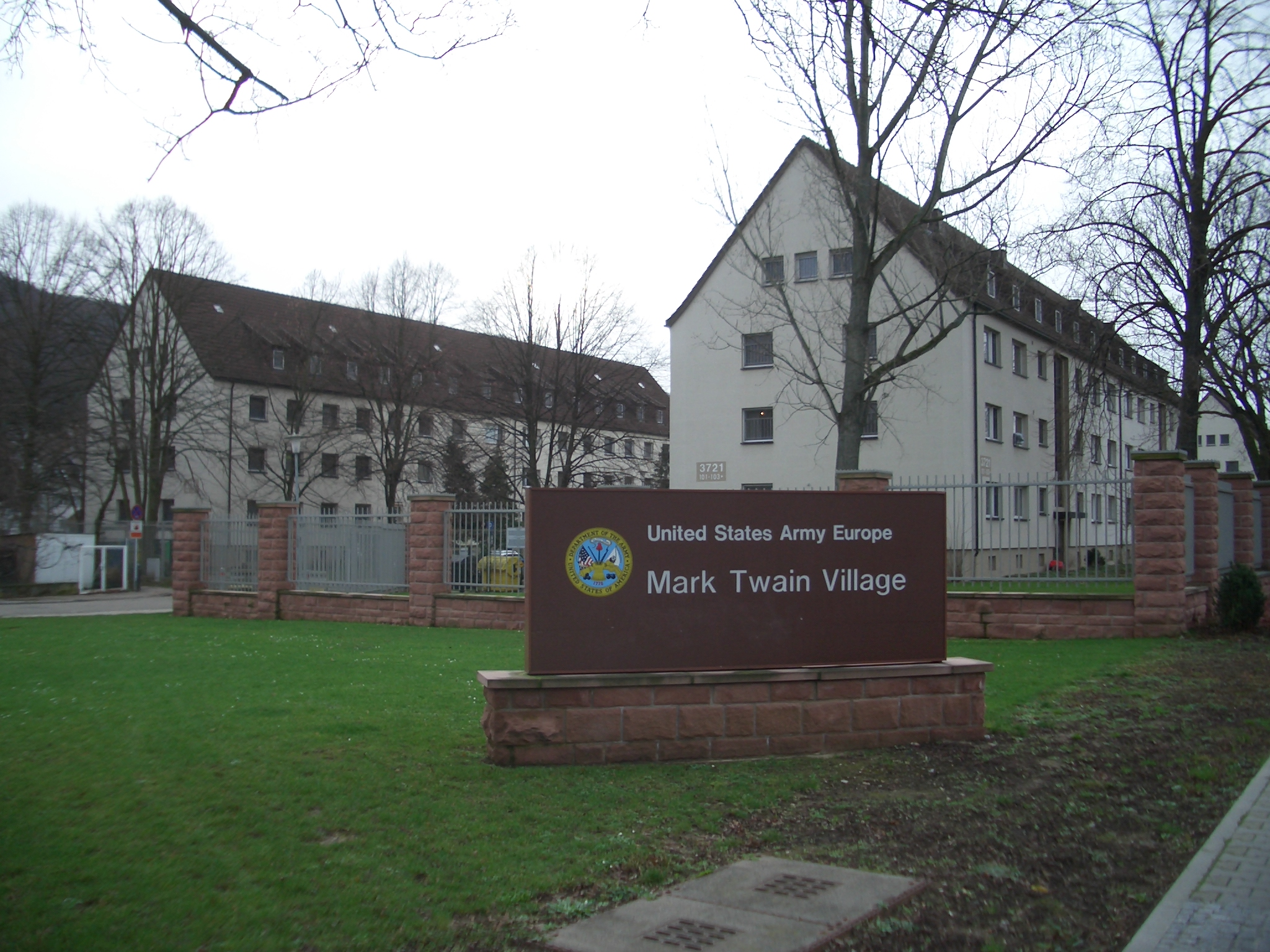
Mark Twain Village

Mark Twain Village (MTV) was a United States Army military family housing area located in the Südstadt district of Heidelberg, Germany. It was one of the two main American family housing areas in the United States Army Garrison Heidelberg that provided quarters for American military personnel, authorized civilian employees, and their families (the other being Patrick Henry Village). MTV was located adjacent to Campbell Barracks, which served as the home to the Headquarters of United States Army Europe (USAREUR), the Headquarters for NATO's Allied Land Forces Central Europe (LANDCENT), and the Installation Management Command Europe Region (IMCOM-E). MTV was separated by a main thoroughfare.

Located within the housing area was an Army and Air Force Exchange Service (AAFES) shoppette, a library, a chapel, the Mark Twain Elementary School, and the Heidelberg High School, which both served American military dependent children living in the surrounding area. The high school served students from Mark Twain Village, nearby Patrick Henry Village, and their respective surrounding areas. Heidelberg High was one of the largest DoDDS schools in Germany. It, along with all the other schools in the Heidelberg area, was closed in 2013.

Most of MTV's housing area has been shut down (the area across the street from Campbell Barracks) and given back to the City of Heidelberg. Because the closed area had severed access from Campbell Barracks, the decision was made that this would be the first portion returned to the City of Heidelberg. In 2016, it was renovated with some buildings already accommodating German civilians. Since 2017, Julius-Springer-Schule has occupied the former Heidelberg High School building at Mark-Twain-Straße 1. Another part of MTV's housing area is now being used by NATO personnel.

For most of its existence, MTV was indistinguishable from the surrounding public residential buildings and was not fenced, gated, or otherwise closed to the general public until 2003, when a fence was installed around MTV and all other United States Army installations in Heidelberg. The entire compound, along with Campbell Barracks, was gated and required United States military ID to enter.
