= St. Bonifatius, Heidelberg =

Coordinates: 49.40395°N 8.68749°E

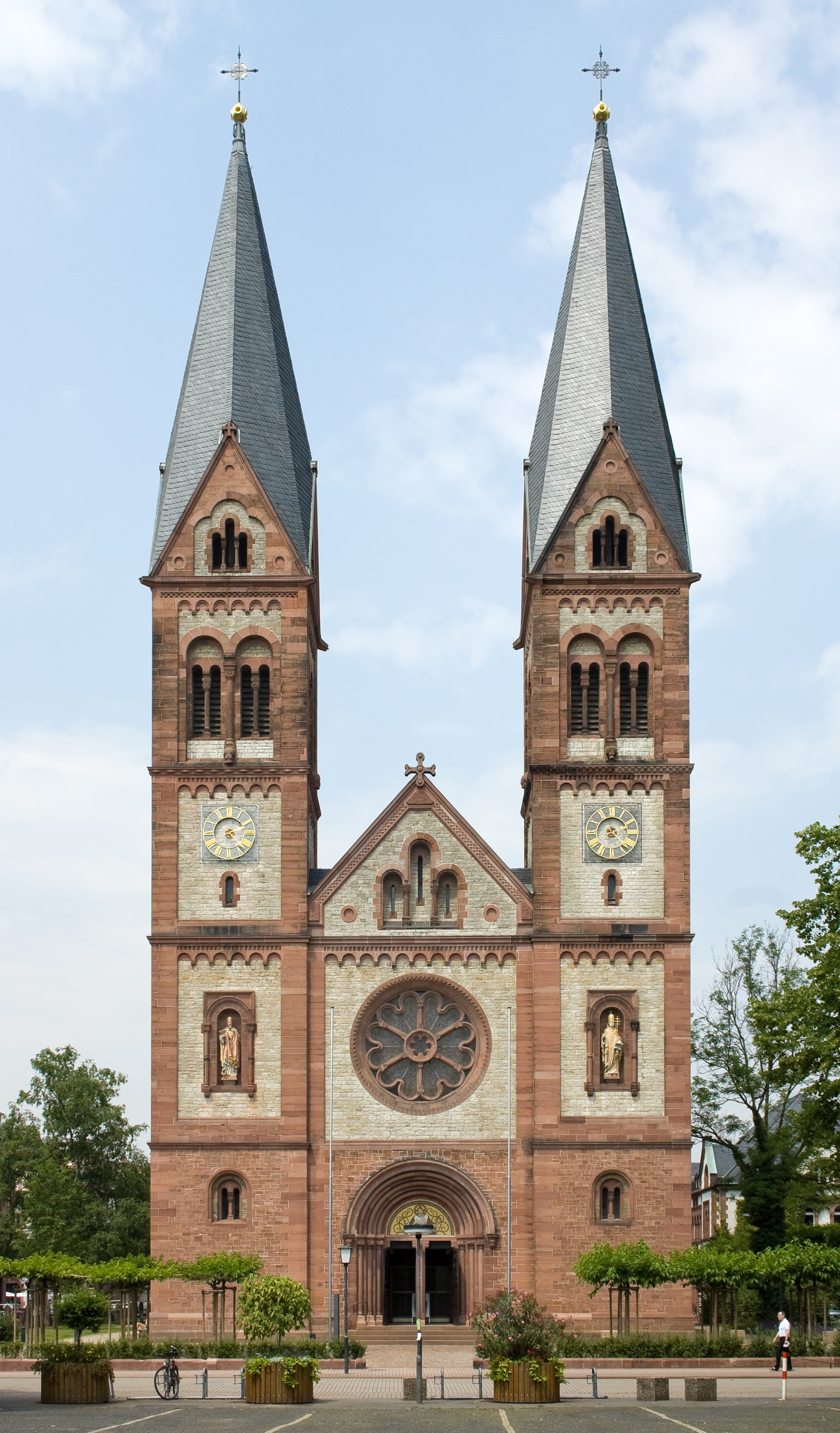
St. Bonifatius in Heidelberg

St. Bonifatius is a Catholic church in the Weststadt of Heidelberg. It is a Romanesque Revival basilica with a transept and a facade with double towers, which was designed by Ludwig Maier and built between 1899 and 1903.

The church is part of the parish of Philipp Neri in the pastoral unit of Heidelberg within the deaconate of Heidelberg-Weinheim, in the Archdiocese of Freiburg.

== History ==
In Heidelberg, which had been a centre of the Reformation, the Jesuit Church was the only Catholic church until the 19th century. At the end of the 19th century, a new suburb, the Weststadt, was established to the west of the Altstadt. From the beginning, it was planned that the suburb would have both a protestant and a Catholic church, with a marketplace in front of the churches.

St. Bonfatius was dedicated on 19 October 1903. The curate was only appointed in 1909 - August Dietrich, who served in the role until 1950.

By 1925, the parish had grown to over 8000 members, so that in 1934, the new parish of St. Albert was split off for the suburb of Bergheim. In 1962, Heidelberg-Südstadt also received its own parish, based at St. Michael's. In 2005, the three parishes were once again united, as a single pastoral unit, and since 2015 they are once again a single parish. Priests from the Oratory of Saint Philip Neri lead the community, so it is called the parish of Philipp Neri.

In 1976, the interior was renovated. From 2005 to 2009, the exterior was cleaned, restoring the contrast between the light limestone and red buntsandstein, which characterise both the interior and exterior of the church.

== Description ==
The three-aisled basilica is based on Rhineland Romanesque models, such as the Basilica of St. Castor in Koblenz. The exterior is structured around the interaction between red buntsandstein blocks and light limestone masonry. The nave is divided - internally and externally - into four sections. The decorated and painted coffered ceiling is modelled on that of St. Michael's Church in Hildesheim and covers the main nave, the octagon at the crossing, the choir and the transepts. The side-aisles and apse are vaulted.

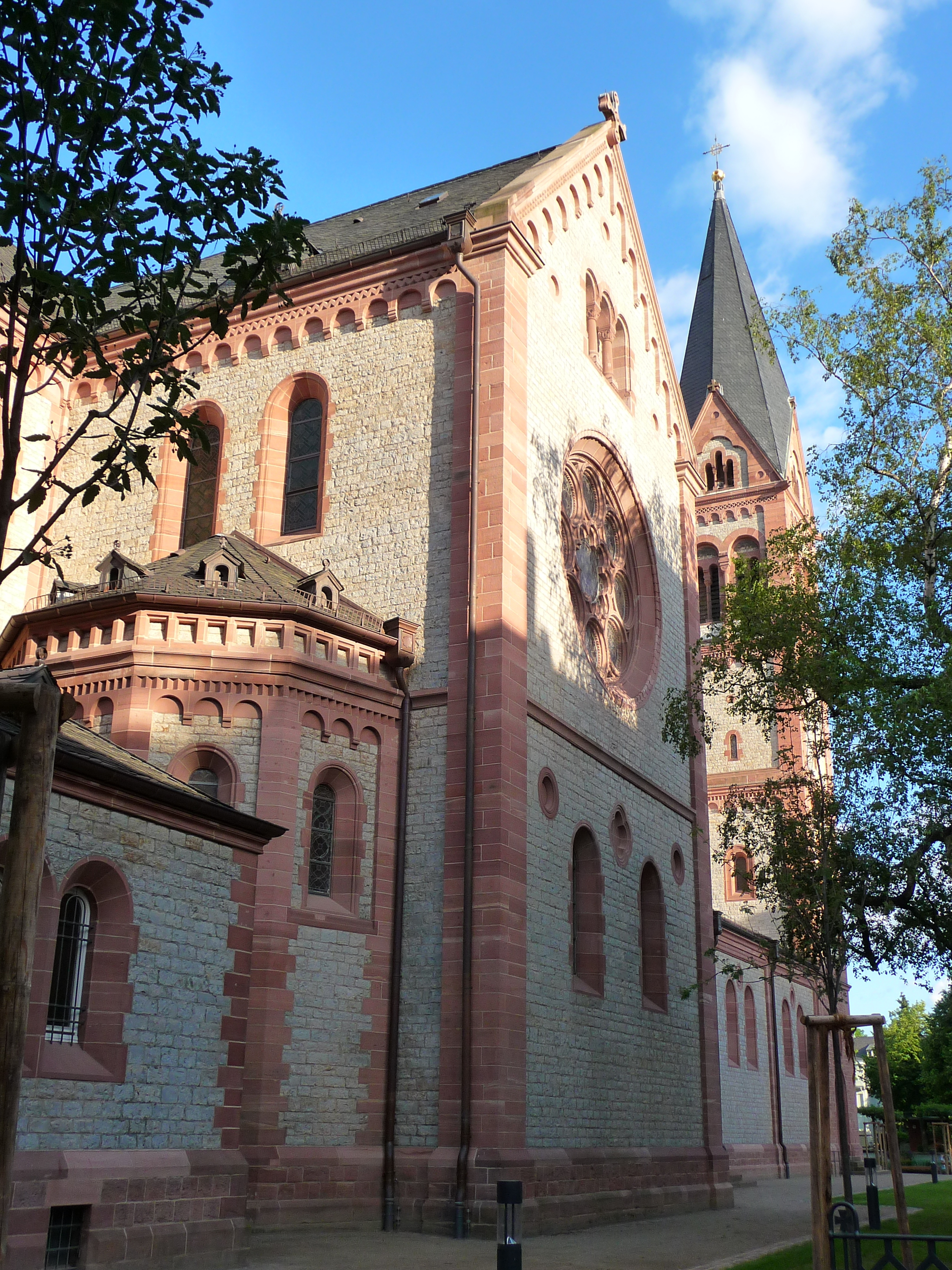
View from northwest in the evening

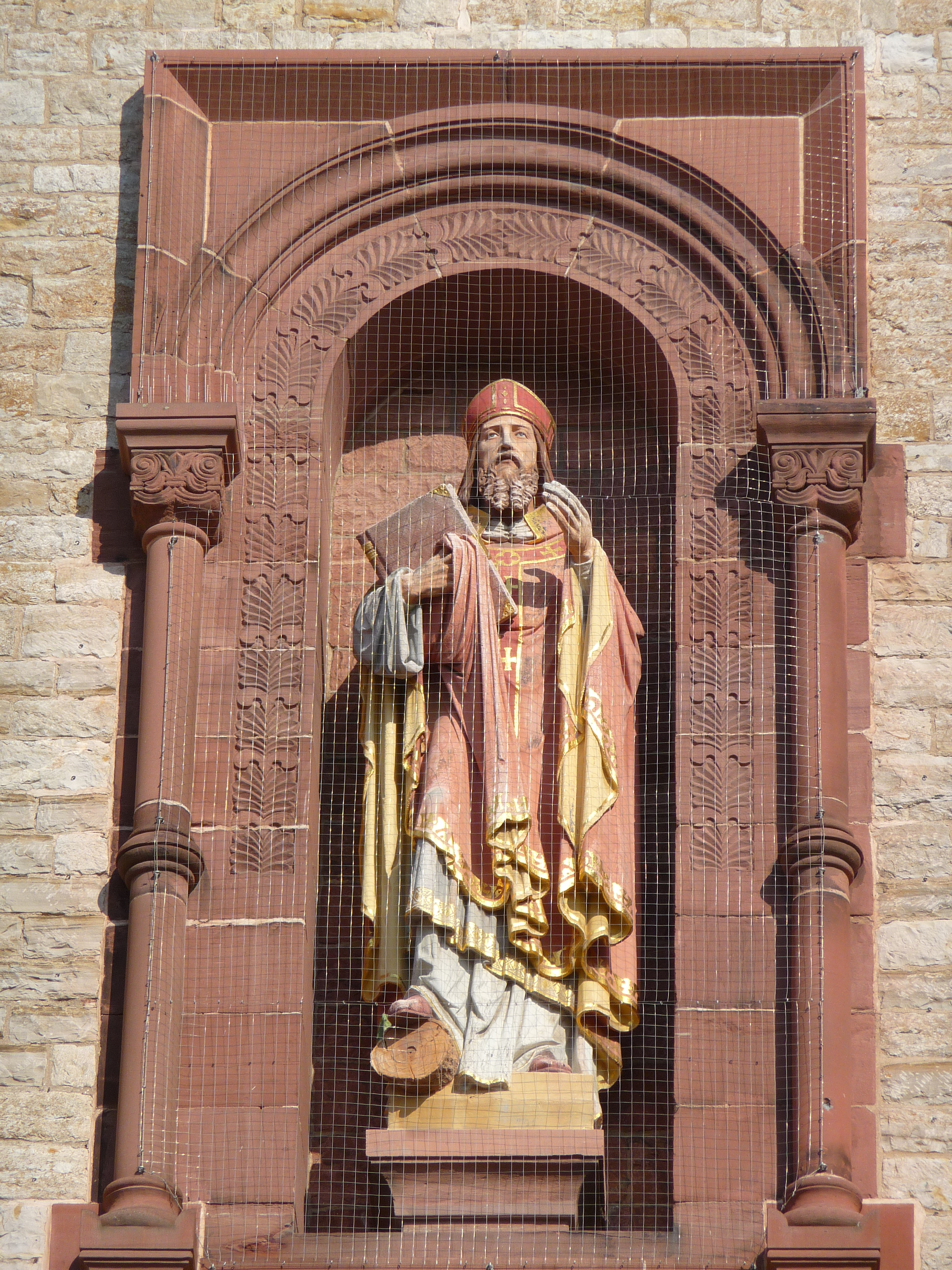
Statue of Bonifatius
on the left tower

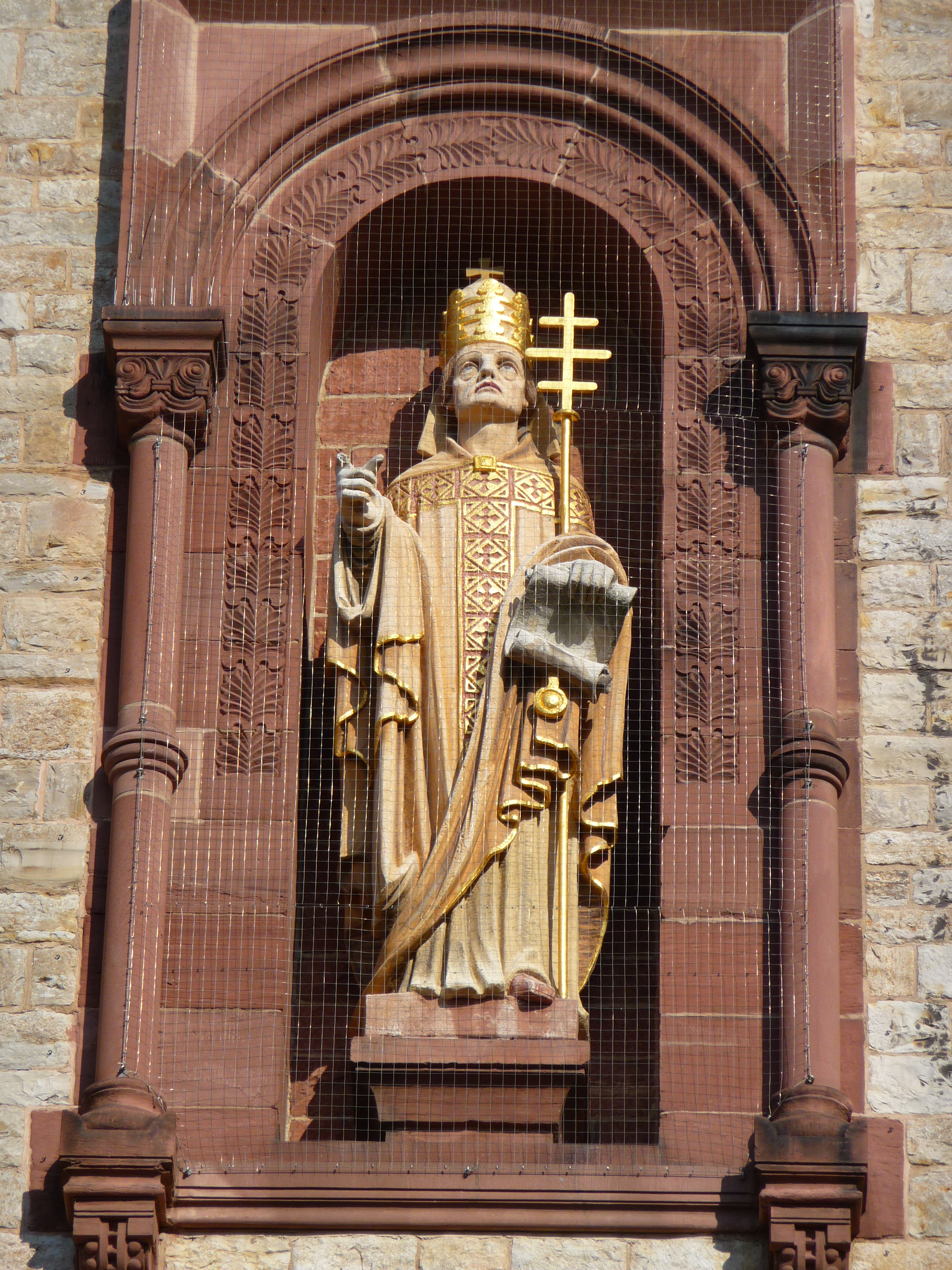
Statue of Pope Gregory II
on the right tower

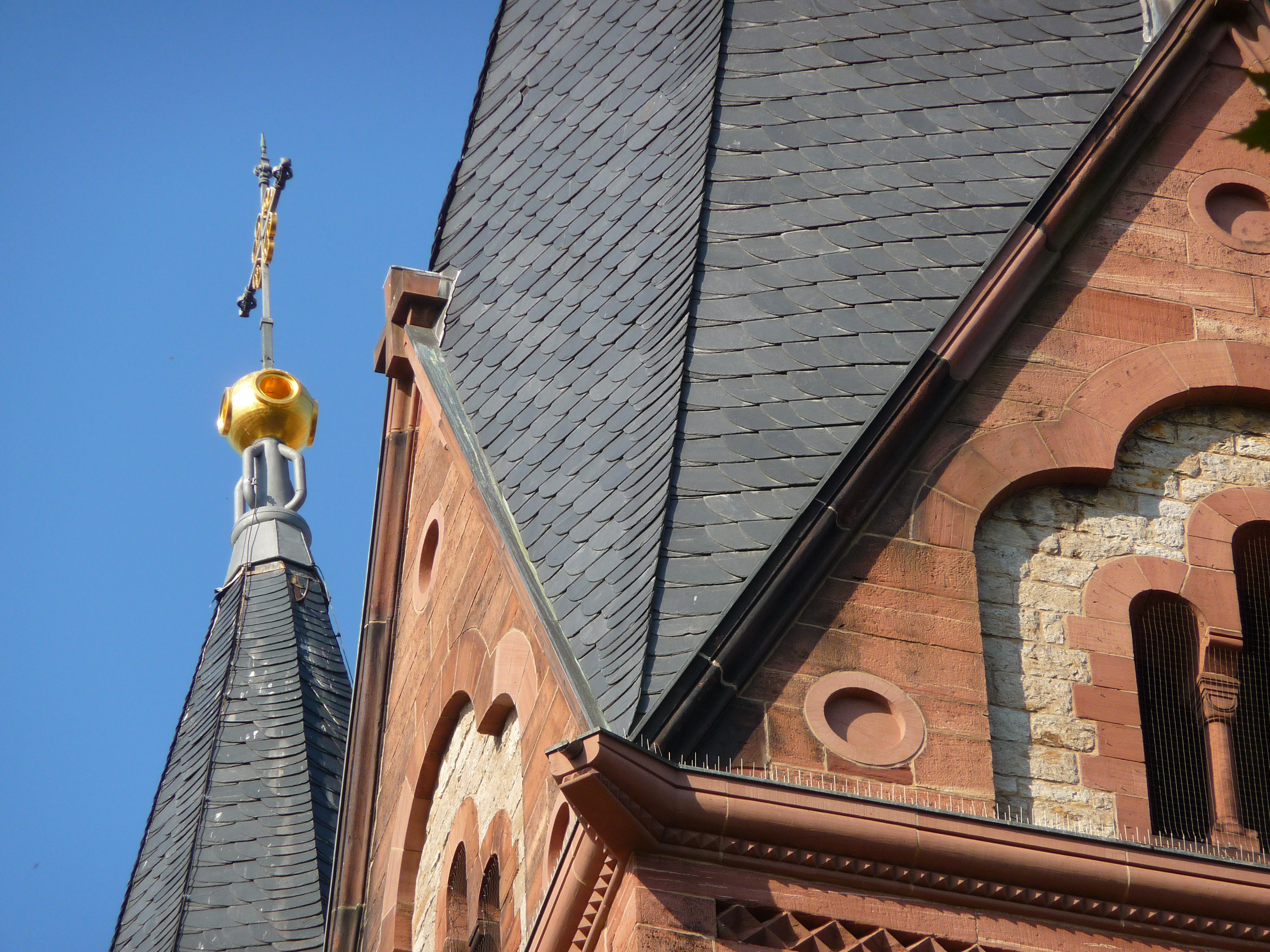
Roof detail

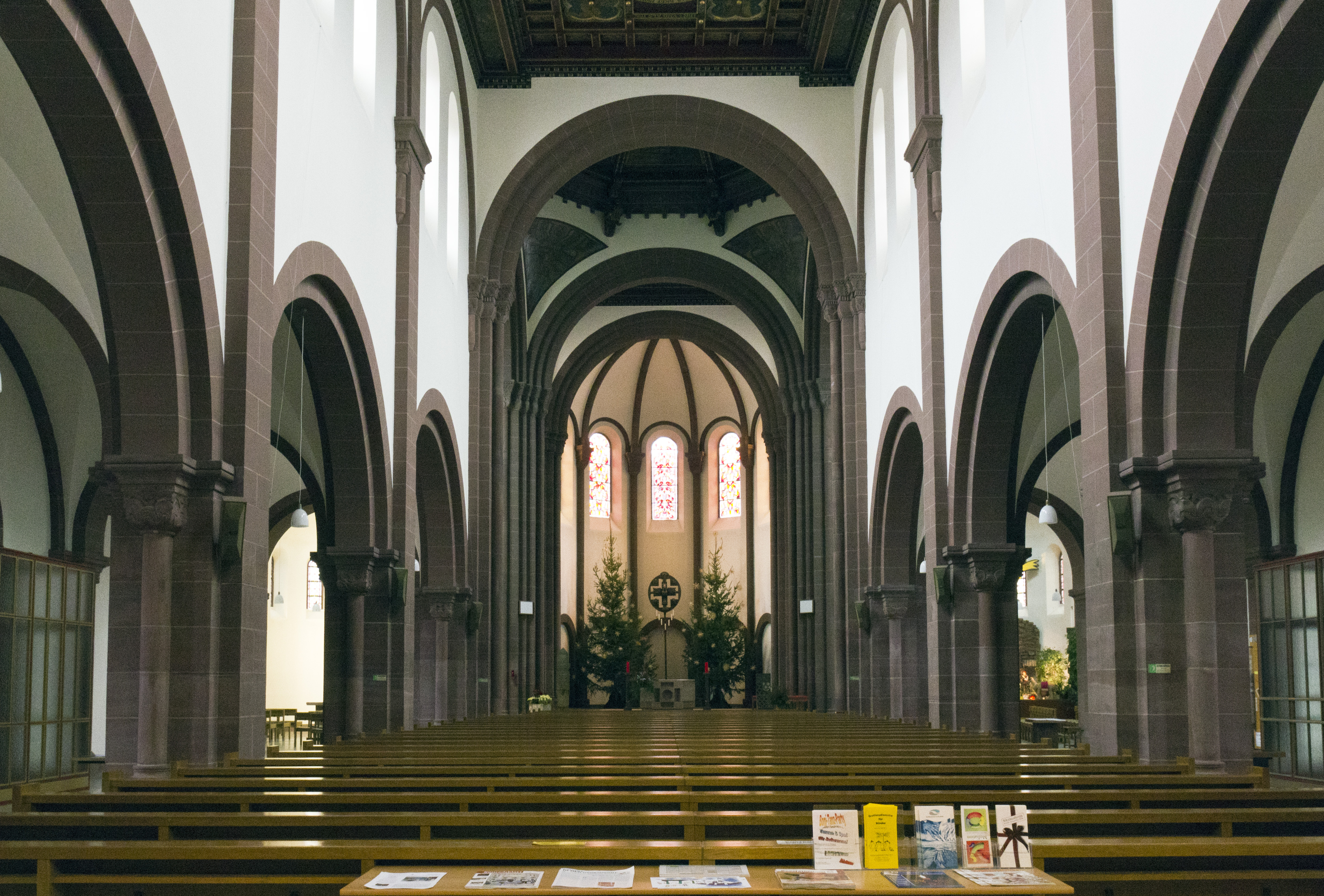
Interior view

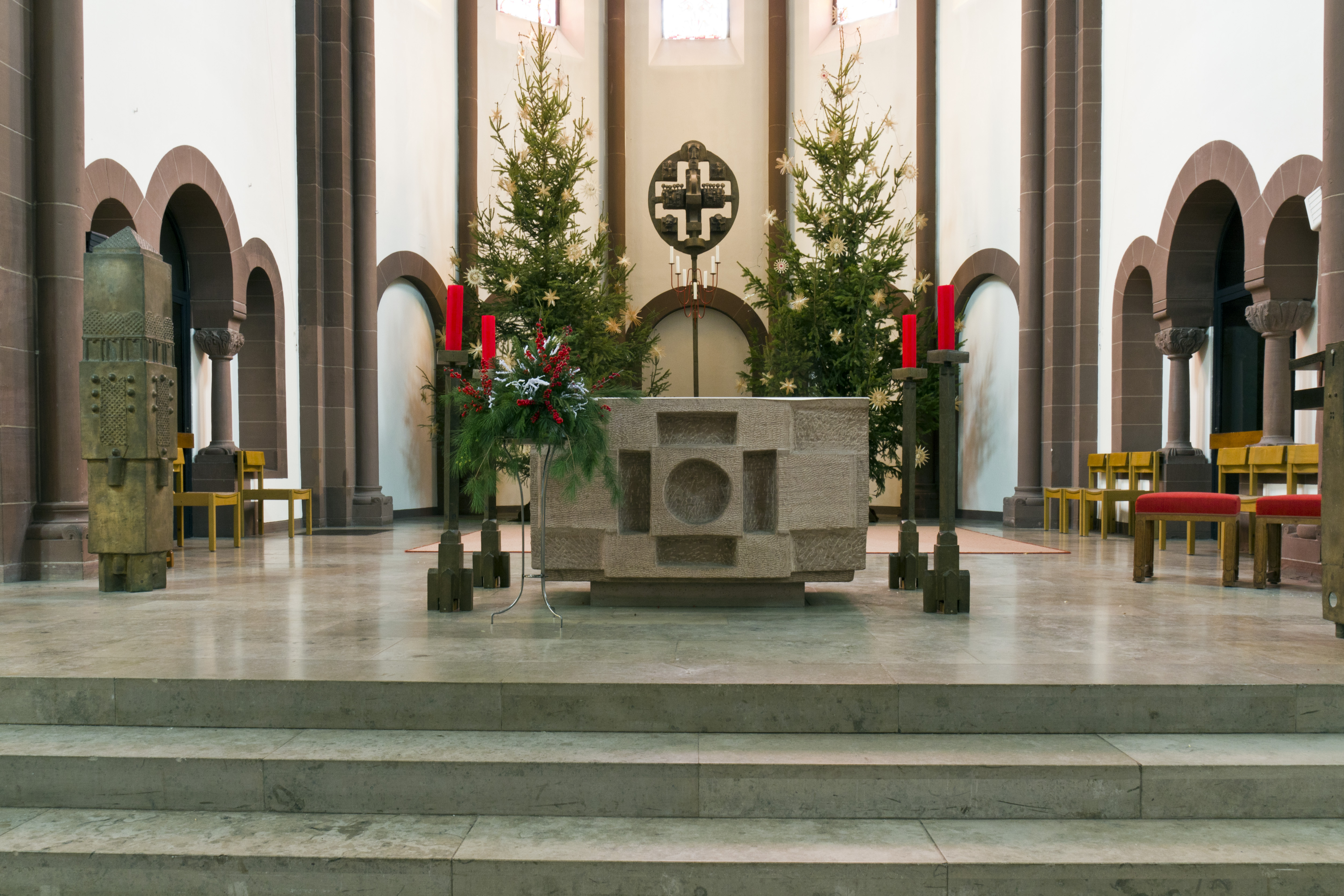
Altar

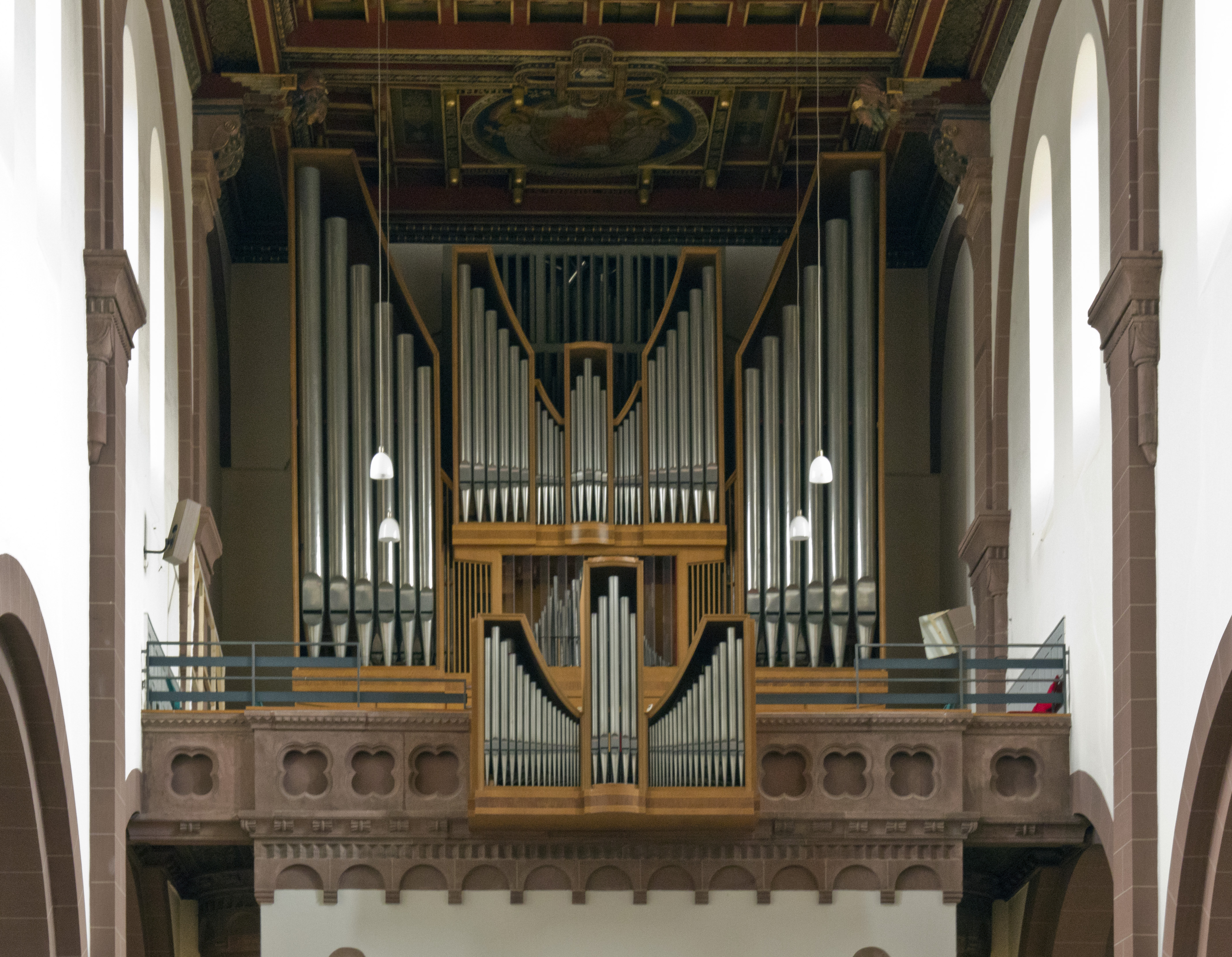
Organ case mit Rückpositiv

== Organ ==
The organ was built in 1964 by the Mönch organworks in Überlingen and expanded by the same firm in 1991–1992. It has 52 stops (3526 pipes).

== Bells ==
The two towers hold a total of five bells. Four of them are cast steel and were made by Bochumer Verein in 1922. The fifth and smallest bell is made of bronze and was created by Friedrich Wilhelm Schilling in 1952. The latter is mainly used for the daily angelus.

Bell	Diameter	Weight	Strike tone	Location
1	1880 mm	2770 kg	b°+1	West tower
2	1493 mm	1395 kg	d’+4	East tower
3	1328 mm	1010 kg	f’+2	East tower
4	1176 mm	732 kg	g’±0	West tower
5	888 mm	464 kg	b’+1	West tower

== Bibliography ==
- Sabine Bruss: Das Werk des Architekten Ludwig Maier (1848–1915). Kiel 1999, ISBN 3-933598-04-4, pp. 70–87.
- Hans Gercke: Katholische Pfarrkirche St. Bonifatius Heidelberg. Schnell und Steiner, Regensburg 2006, ISBN 3-7954-4888-3.
