= 7th Combat Weather Squadron =

7th Combat Weather Squadron

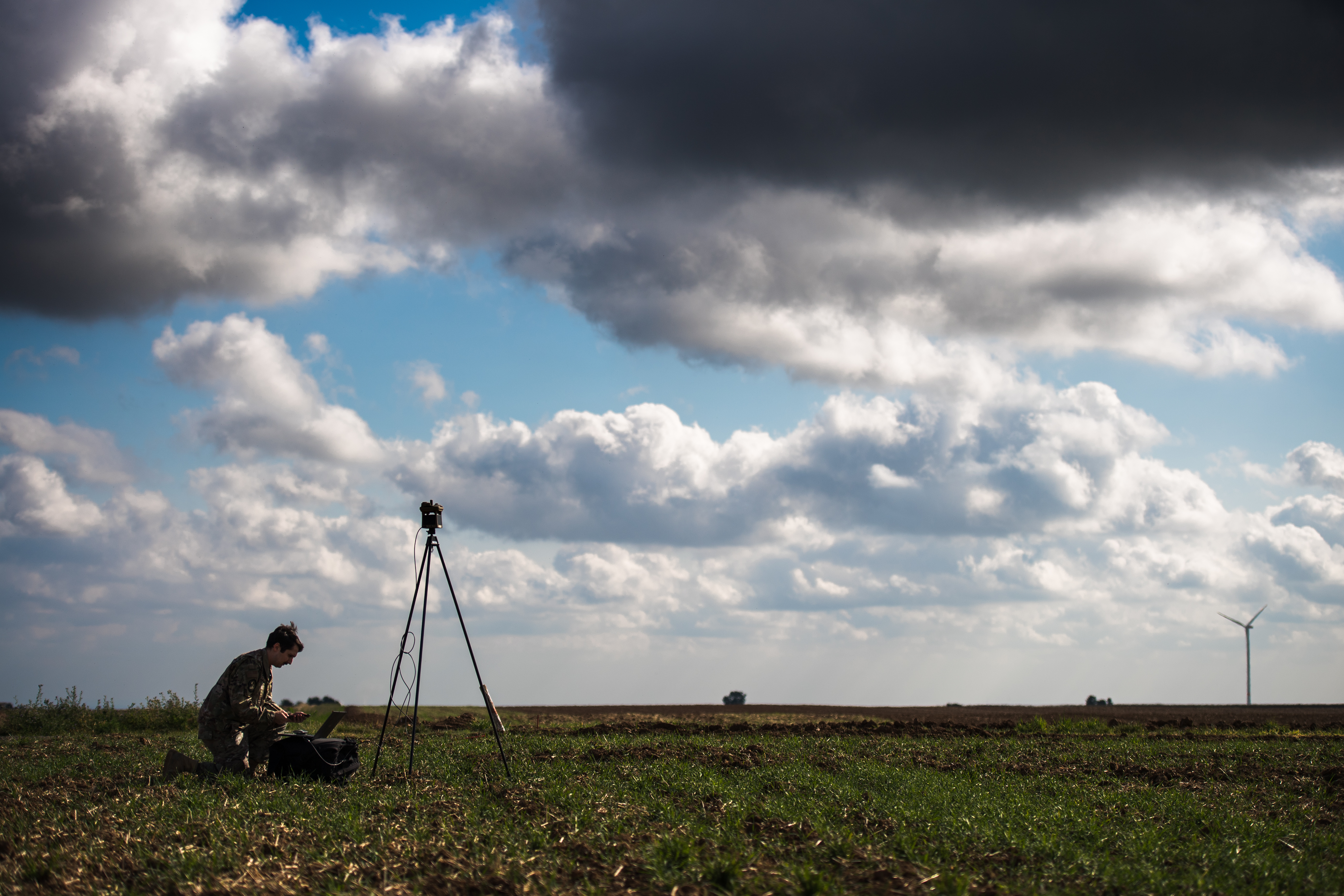
- A squadron airman collects weather data prior to an airborne insertion exercise in Germany, 2020
- Active: 1941–1945; 1959–1994; 1996–present
- Country: United States
- Branch: United States Air Force
- Type: Squadron
- Role: Weather Exploitation
- Part of: United States Air Forces in Europe – Air Forces Africa: Third Air Force; 435th Air Ground Operations Wing; 4th Air Support Operations Group
- Garrison/HQ: Lucius D. Clay Kaserne, Germany
- Mottos: E Nubibus Informatio (Latin: "From the Sky, Knowledge")

Insignia
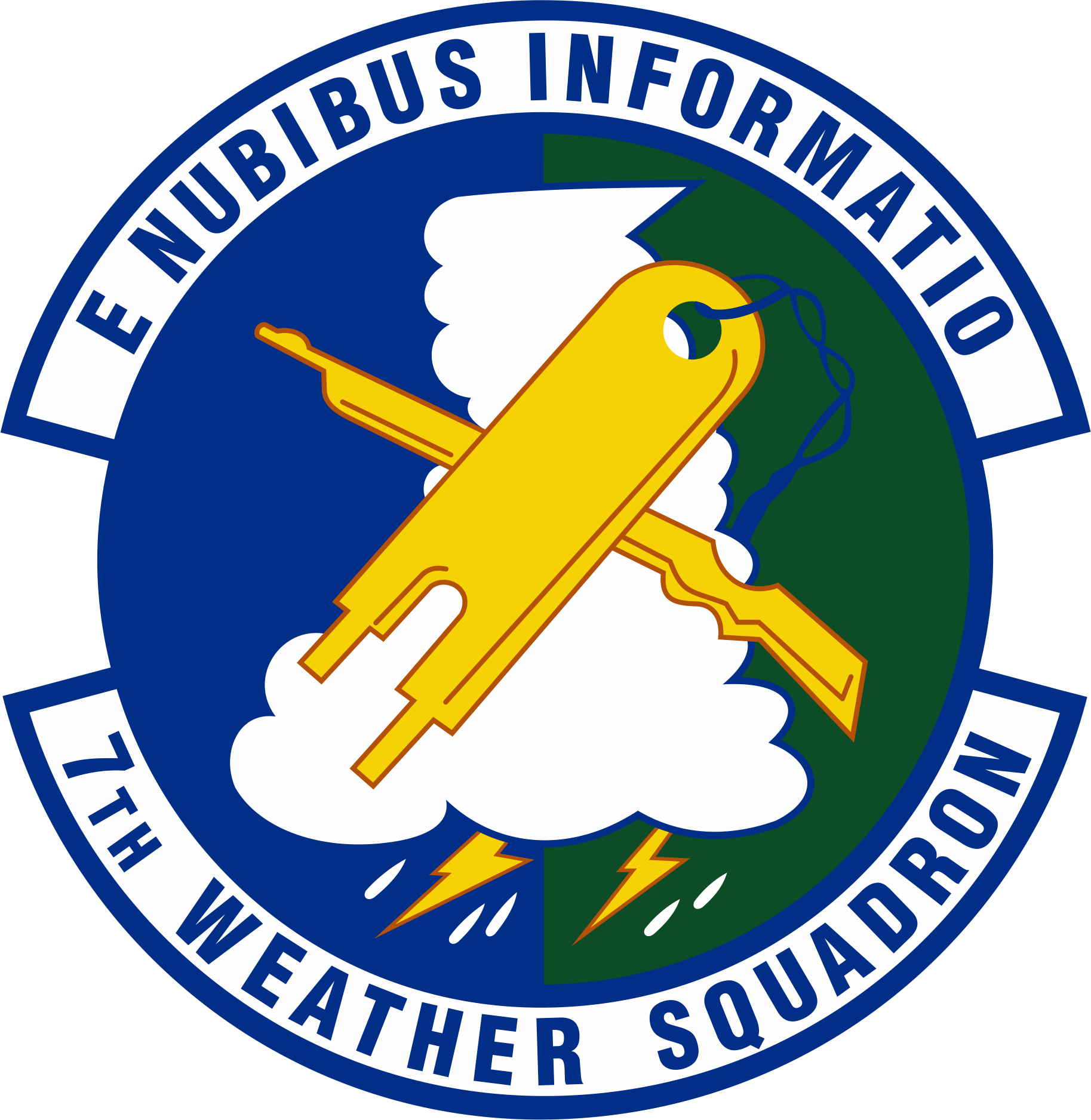
- 7th Combat Weather Squadron emblem

The 7th Combat Weather Squadron (7 CWS), based out of Wiesbaden, Germany, is a United States Air Force squadron providing weather intelligence to United States Army Europe and Africa (USAREUR-AF) forces across the United States European Command (USEUCOM) and United States Africa Command (USAFRICOM) domains. Its twin squadron, the 7th Expeditionary Combat Weather Squadron, was inactivated in 2021 and replaced by the 13th Expeditionary Combat Weather Squadron.

== Personnel and resources ==
There are currently 87 members in the 7th Combat Weather Squadron. They consist of AF meteorologists, airfield systems support staff, knowledge operations managers, and personnel managers. The squadron is responsible for over $4 million in resources and equipment, including the Kestrel 4000, TMOS (Tactical Meteorological Observation System), laser rangefinder, and Iridium phones.

== Lineage ==
- Constituted as Air Corps Detachment, Weather, Hawaii on 15 Nov 1940

Activated on 1 January 1941
Redesignated 7th Air Corps Squadron, Weather on 18 November 1941
Redesignated 7th AAF Squadron, Weather in March 1942
Redesignated 7th Weather Squadron in January 1943

- Disbanded 10 February 1945
- Reconstituted on 1 June 1959

Activated on 8 July 1959
Inactivated 1 July 1994 (Note: Mission, personnel, and equipment transferred to 617th Weather Squadron)
Activated 1 August 1996 (Note: Assumed mission, personnel, and equipment from 617th Weather Squadron)
Redesignated 7th Combat Weather Squadron on 1 October 2020

=== Assignments ===
- 17th Air Base Group, 1 January 1941
- Hawaiian Air Force, 18 Nov 1941
- Hawaiian Air Force Base Command (later 7th Air Force Base Command), 22 January 1942
- Seventh Air Force, 19 Apr 1943
- Army Air Forces, Central Pacific Area, 12 May 1944
- United States Army Air Force, Central Pacific Ocean Area, 1 Aug 1944
- 1st Weather Group (Provisional), 4 Sep 1944 – 10 February 1945
- 2d Weather Wing, 8 July 1959
- United States Air Forces Europe, 1 October 1991 (Note: Operational control was exercised by the Deputy Chief of Staff for Operations) – 1 July 1994
- 4th Air Support Operations Group, 1 August 1996
- United States Air Forces Europe, 3 March 1998 (Note: Operational control was exercised by the Weather Division of the Directorate of Operations) – 1 July 1994
- 4th Air Support Operations Group, 1 October 2005 – present

=== Stations ===
- Hickam Field, Hawaii, 1 January 1941 – 10 February 1945
- Heidelberg, Germany (Campbell Barracks) 8 July 1959 – 1 July 1994
- Heidelberg, Germany, 1 August 1996 – 1 April 2013
- Wiesbaden, Germany (Clay Kaserne), 31 March 2013 – Present

== Duty Assignments ==
=== Headquarters Clay Kaserne, Wiesbaden ===
The 7 CWS headquarters is located in Wiesbaden, Germany. It consists of the Commander and support staff as well as 5 sections. These sections include the Operations Superintendent (DOS), Current Operations (DOO), Logistics and Resources (DOL), Contingency Plans and Programs (DOX), and Education and Training (DOT). These sections, along with the Commander and support staff work in tandem to maximize the warfighting capabilities of the detachments assigned to the 7 CWS.

==== Weather Operations Flight – Clay Kaserne ====
The Weather Operations Flight (WOF), 7th Combat Weather Squadron is located at Clay Kaserne, Germany. Their mission is to provide and/or arrange for decision-scale environmental intelligence for the 1/214th General Support Aviation Battalion.

==== Detachment 2 – Grafenwoehr ====
Detachment 2, 7th Combat Weather Squadron, is located at Grafenwoehr Army Air Field, Germany. Their mission is to enhance warfighter capability by interpreting meteorological impact upon training and real-world operations with optimized staff weather liaison support to Joint Multinational Command Training Center (JMTC), Joint Multinational Readiness Center (JMRC), 2nd Cavalry Regiment (2CR), 1/214th Aviation Regiment, Charlie Company MEDEVAC, and NATO allies. As a secondary mission support role, Detachment 2 also hosts exercise CADRE FOCUS.

==== Detachment 3 – Vicenza ====
Detachment 3 is located in Vicenza, Italy. Detachment 3's airmen operate in support of US Army Africa and the 173rd Infantry Brigade Combat Team (Airborne) (173 IBCT(A)). Foremost is the monitoring of Army operations across Africa for weather impacts and seasonal trends (e.g. drought, flooding).

==== Detachment 4 – Katterbach ====
Detachment 4, 7th Combat Weather Squadron, is located on Katterbach Kaserne (Ansbach Army Heliport), Germany. Based in Bavaria, their mission is to support U.S. Army attack aviation, MEDEVAC, and cargo rotary-wing assets of the 12th Combat Aviation Brigade with area and location specific forecasts, as well as climatology and long-range forecasts to key headquarters staff.

==== Operating Location Alpha, Kapaun ====
Operating Location Alpha (OL-A), 7th Combat Weather Squadron, is located at Kapaun Air Station, Germany. Their mission is to provide all maintenance actions for 76 Air Traffic Control and Landing Systems worth $23 million at 26 installations throughout Europe, directly contributing to the operational effectiveness of 376 combat aircraft. OL-A joined the 7th Combat Weather Squadron team in December 2014. They were previously part of the 1st Communication Maintenance Squadron.

== Emblem ==
BLAZON

On a disc per pale Azure and Vert, a cumulonimbus cloud emitting raindrops all Argent and two lightning flashes to base Or, fimbriated Gold Brown, all surmounted by a rifle and psychrometer in saltire of the fourth, fimbriated and detailed of the fifth, a cord attached to the psychrometer of the first, all within a narrow border Blue.

Attached above the disc, a White scroll edged with a narrow Blue border and inscribed “E NUBIBUS INFORMATIO” in Blue letters.

Attached below the disc, a White scroll edged with a narrow Blue border and inscribed "7TH WEATHER SQUADRON" in Blue letters.

SIGNIFICANCE

Ultramarine blue and Air Force yellow are the Air Force colors. Blue alludes to the sky, the primary theater of Air Force operations. Yellow refers to the sun and the excellence required of Air Force personnel. The emblem is symbolic of the Squadron and its mission. Against a divided background (one side representing the sky and the other, land) to symbolize the Air Force and the Army, a rising cumulonimbus cloud emitting lightning and rain, indicates the mission of weather. The crossed rifle and psychrometer portray the cooperation of the Army and Air Force and the Squadron's mission of providing weather service to the United States Army. The Latin motto, "E NUBIBUS INFORMATIO", translates to "From the Sky, Knowledge" in English.

== Awards ==
Campaign Streamer, Asian Pacific Theater (7 Dec 41 – 6 Dec 43) Battle Credits (authority) Central Pacific (WDGO Dec 46) Philippine Islands (WDGO Dec 46) Western Pacific (WDGO Dec 46)

Campaign Streamer, Kosovo Air Campaign (24 Mar – 10 Jun 99)

Air Force Outstanding Unit Award

1 Jan 1968 – 31 Dec 1969
1 Jul 1972 – 30 Jun 1974
1 Jul 1975 – 30 Jun 1977
1 Jul 1977 – 30 Jun 1979
1 Jul 1982 – 30 Jun 1984
1 Jul 1984 – 30 Jun 1986
1 Jul 1990 – 30 Sep 1991
1 Jul 1995 – 30 Jun 1997
1 Jul 2002 – 30 Jun 2004 (with Valor)
1 Jul 2004 – 30 Sep 2005 (with Valor)
1 Jan 2006 – 31 Dec 2007
1 Jan 2011 – 31 Dec 2011
1 Jan 2015 - 31 Dec 2016
1 Jan 2017 – 31 Dec 2017

USAF Organizational Excellence Award 1 Jul 2000 - 30 Jun 2002
