= Weststadt, Heidelberg =

Weststadt
- Stadtteil of Heidelberg
- Location of Weststadt within Heidelberg
- Interactive map of Weststadt
- Location within Germany Location within Baden-Württemberg
- Coordinates: 49°24′N 08°41′E
- Country: Germany
- State: Baden-Württemberg
- City: Heidelberg

Area
  - Total: 1.74 km^{2} (0.67 sq mi)

Population
  - Total: 12,654
  - Density: 7,270/km^{2} (18,800/sq mi)
- Time zone: UTC+01:00 (CET)
  - Summer (DST): UTC+02:00 (CEST)
- Website: Stadt Heidelberg (PDF; 124 kB)

Weststadt ("West City") is a suburb of Heidelberg created during the 19th century, when Heidelberg expanded to the west along the railways during the Industrial Revolution. The development of Weststadt into the first suburb at the base of the Gaisberg hill is closely connected with Heidelberg's development into a metropolis. Following further expansion, the new suburbs of Südstadt and Bahnstadt were created to the south and west respectively.

The central square is Wilhelmsplatz, which is used for regular events, daily recreation and a farmer's market on Mondays and Thursdays.

== Description ==
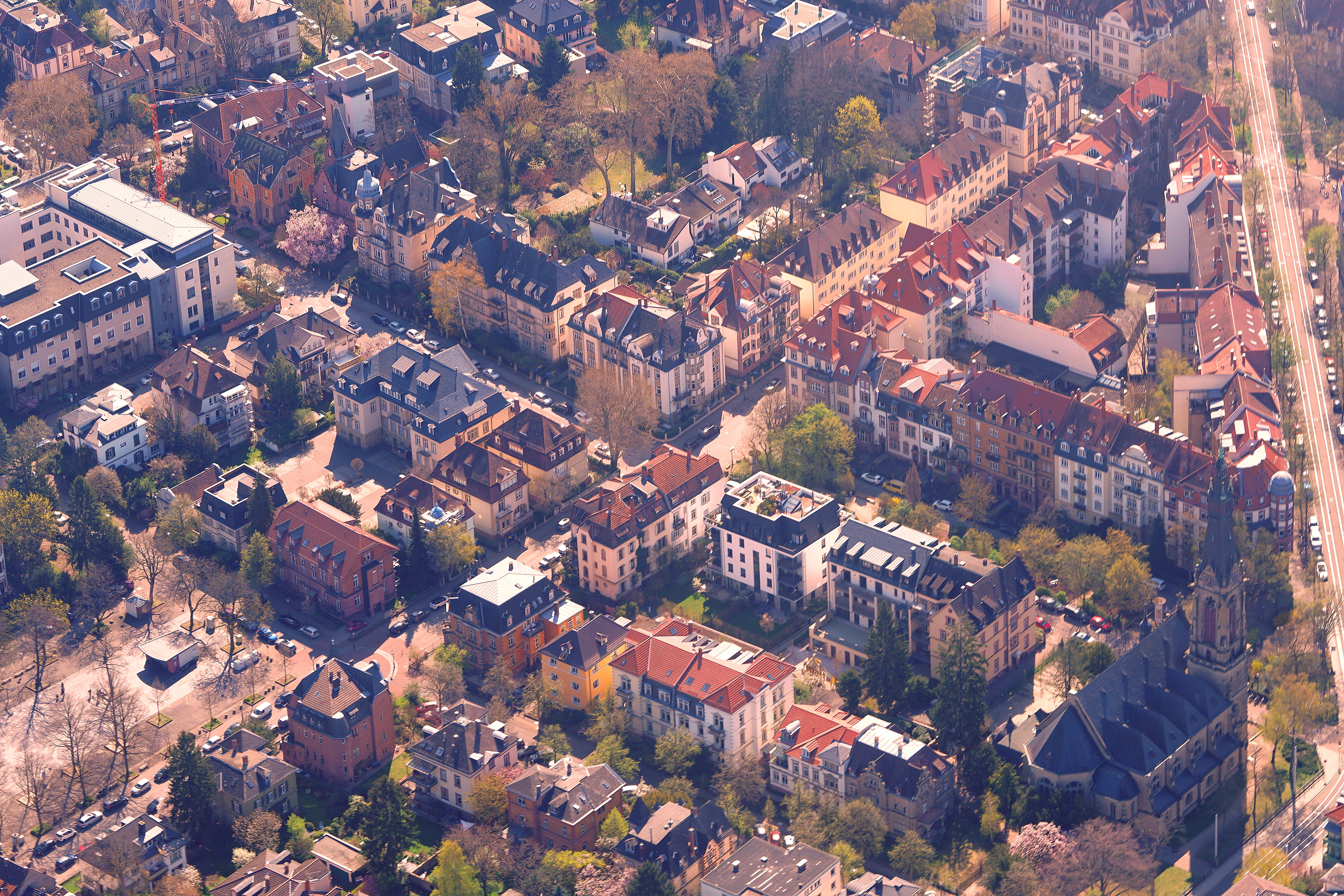
Heidelberg-Weststadt, Kleinschmidtstraße and Zähringerstraße

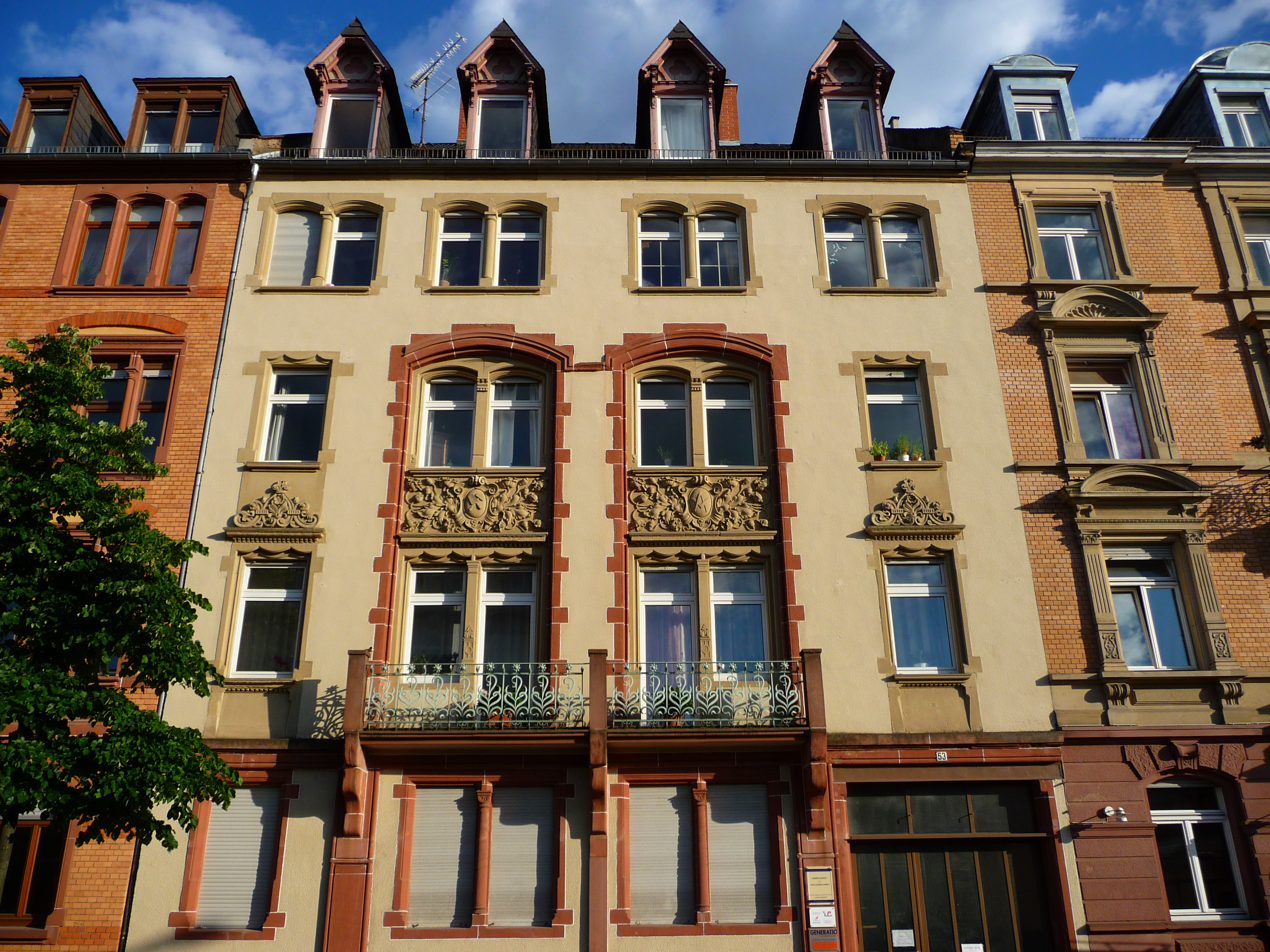
Characteristic dwelling at the edge of Weststadt

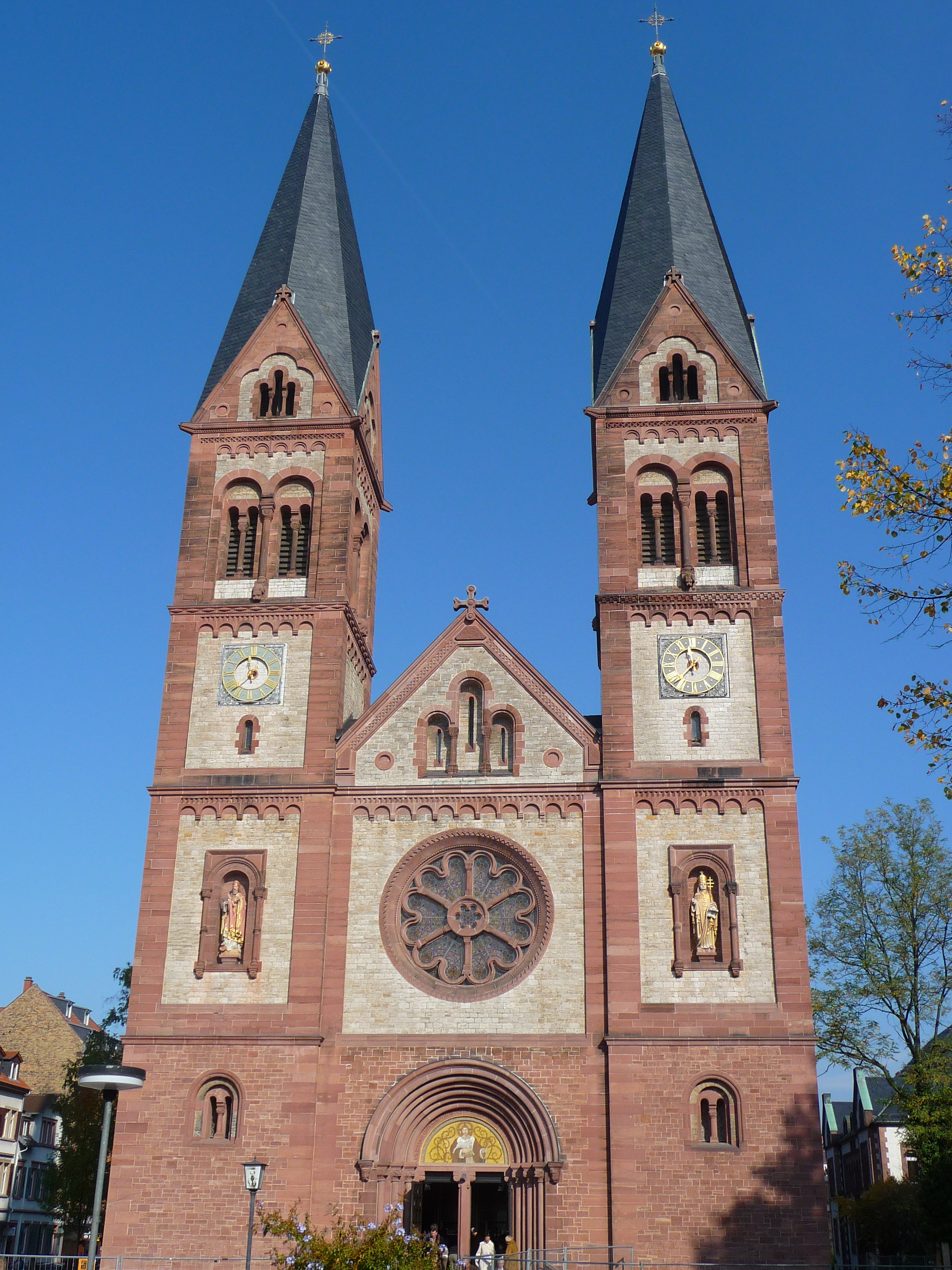
St. Bonifatius.

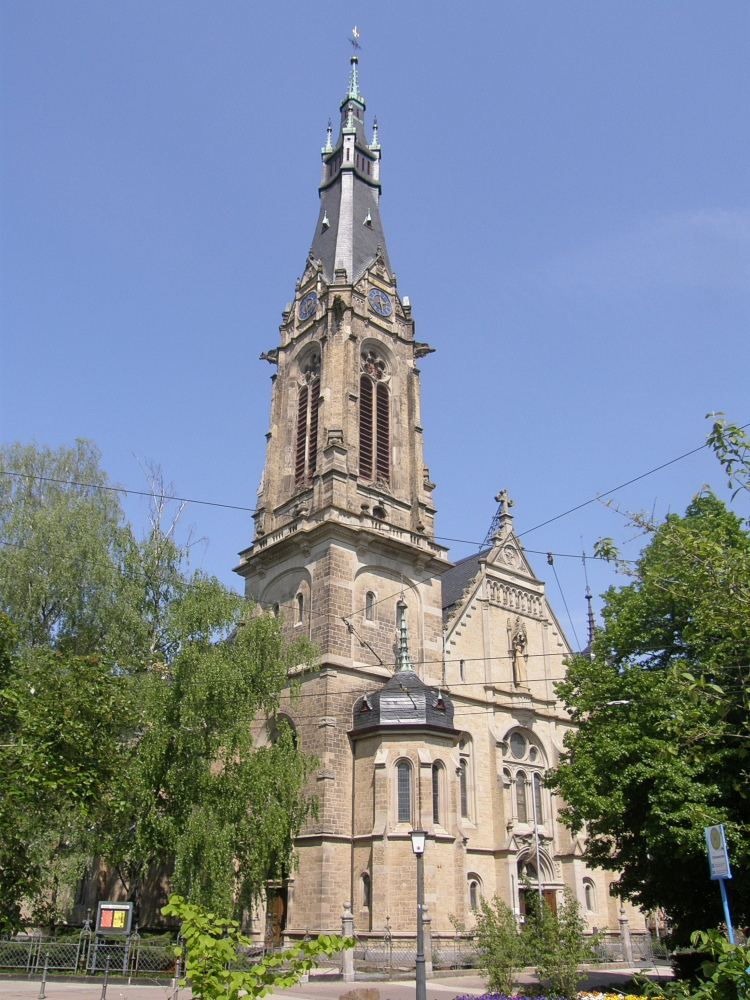
Christuskirche.

The cityscape consists partially of villas and partially of three-to-five story multi-family dwellings. Most houses were built before 1910 and remain in good structural condition. In the northwestern portion of the suburb and along Schiller und Römer streets, old stone constructions dominate. West of Römer street up to the train station, modern apartment blocks with four or five floors, built in the 1950s and 1970s predominate. The new Heidelberg Hauptbahnhof, which opened in 1955, is located in the suburb. Weststadt also used to contain the employment office, the freight train station, and the main post office. There are two churches dating back to the foundation of the suburb, the Catholic St. Bonifatius and the Protestant Christuskirche, whose 65 metre high tower is one of the major landmarks of western Heidelberg.

In the north, Weststadt is separated from Bergheim by the major transport artery of Kurfürstenanlage. This used to be the railway line, but after the 1960s it was converted into a street and the space used for several courthouses and a finance office, which was in turn demolished in 2014. To the east is the Gaisberg, a subsidiary of the Königstuhl in the southern Odenwald. Rohrbacher street runs in a north–south direction, separating a small part of the suburb on the slope of the hill from the rest of Weststadt. The southern border with Südstadt is marked by an old railway line for freight trains, running from the Königstuhl tunnel to the old freight train station, which was relatively recently rewilded. It is directly next to the Neckar Valley Railway (Heidelberg-Neckargemünd-Eberbach), which remains active.

The freight train line, along with the old freight station, the Hauptbahnhof, and the line from the Hauptbahnhof to the Königstuhl tunnel, form the so-called "Bahninsel" (railway island). This is primarily an industrial area. To the south of it is a new residential area, In Sand, consisting of two-to-three story houses and apartments. In the east, separated from the Hauptbahnhof by the railway lines to the south, is a school area. The Weststadt/Südstadt station of the Rhine-Neckar S-Bahn is located nearby.

Most of Bahninsel will part of the new suburb of Bahnstadt, which was still under construction as of 2021. The Hauptbahnhof will form the boundary between Weststadt and Bahnstadt and the border will continue south from there, separating off the industrial area and the residential area In Sand.

=== Infrastructure ===
There are several grocery stores, retail stores, hotels, and craftworkers. At the northern end of the suburb is the hub for the administration of justice and finance for the whole region. Heidelberg's main shopping centres are located at the northeastern corner of Weststadt in the area around Poststraße and Bismarckplatz.

There are several kindergartens and schools. The Landhausgrundschule (country house elementary school) is a stone structure which was used as a hospital during the First World War (Ernst Jünger was a patient in 1915). At the southern border with Südstadt is a school centre, consisting of the Pestalozzi elementary school, the Willy-Hellpach-Wirtschaftsgymnasium, and several buildings belonging to the Julius Springer vocational school. There is also a youth centre, the Haus der Jugend ("House of Youth"). Other buildings belonging to the Julius Springer school are located in Südstadt, on the other side of the old railway line, along with the Helmholtz-Gymnasium Heidelberg. Other secondary schools - both gymnasien and realschulen - are located in the surrounding suburbs. The Hochschule für Kirchenmusik Heidelberg, a tertiary institution devoted to church music, is also located in Weststadt.

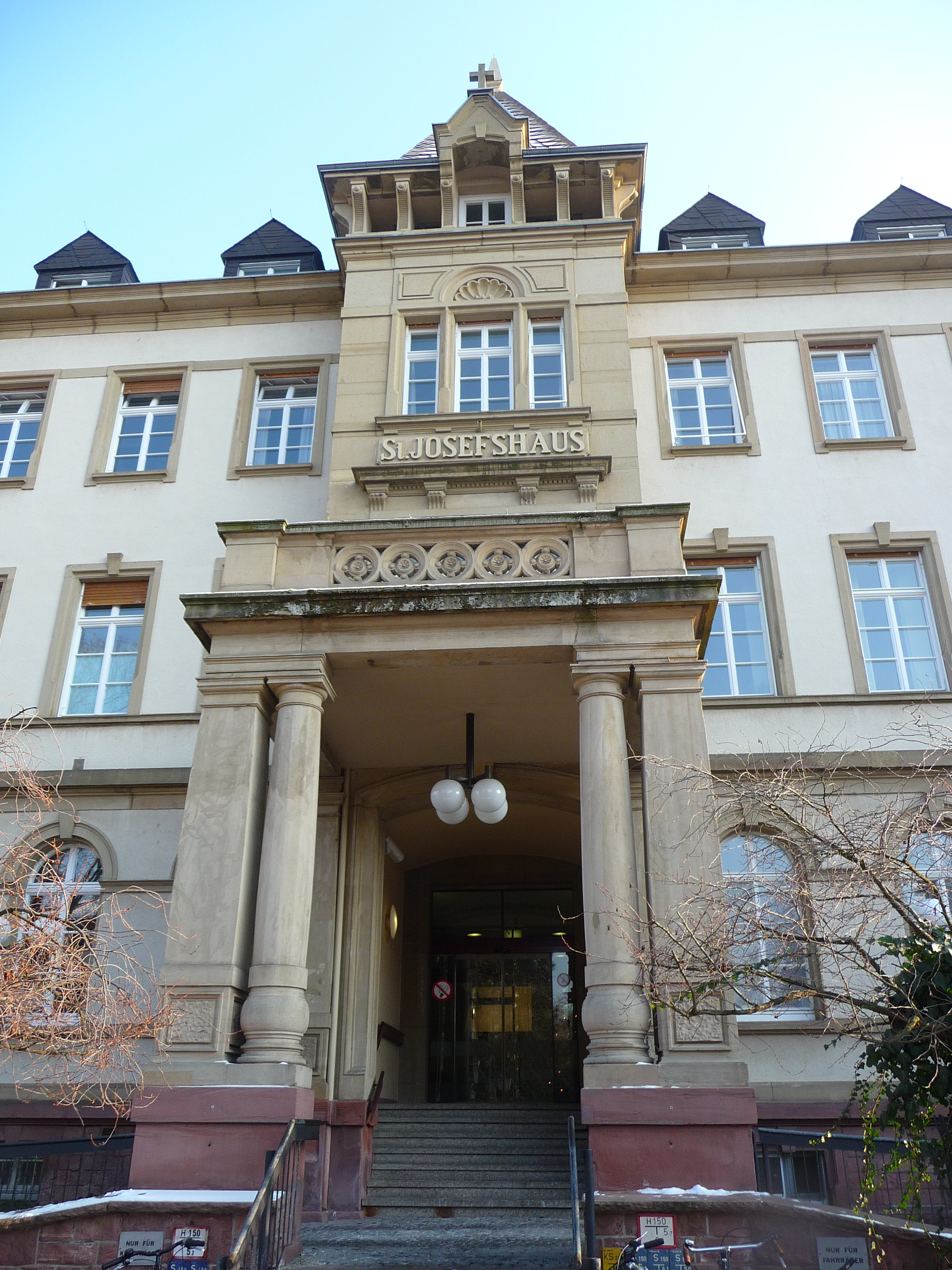
Main entrance to St. Josefskrankenhaus in Heidelberg

St Josefkrankenhaus is the hospital and hospice for the suburb and the wider area. The Bethany special hospital for geriatrics is located just over the border in Südstadt. It contains both apartments and a day hospital and also serves a wider area than just the surrounding suburbs.

The local cemetery is the Bergfriedhof, located on the lower slopes of Gaisberg in the neighbouring section of Südstadt.

== Flora and Fauna ==
- There is a wild population of rose-ringed parakeets around the Römerkreis.
- Horse chestnut, sweet chestnut and linded are typical trees.

== Politics ==
Internal representation of Weststadt is guaranteed by the district council. It is meant to ensure civic administration remains responsive to the will of the citizens. The members of the district council serve as contact points for problems relating to the suburb. They are kept informed and consulted by the city council on many issues. The district council consists of the following members:

Party/List	2019
Greens	7
CDU	2
SPD	2
The Left	1
"Die Heidelberger"	1
HiB	1
FDP	1
GAL	1
BL	1

== Notable residents ==
- Dietrich Hildebrandt (1944–2015), former Member of the Landtag (Alliance 90/The Greens)
- Angelika Köster-Loßack (born 1947), former Member of the Bundestag (Alliance 90/The Greens)
- Lothar Binding (born 1950), Member of the Bundestag (SPD) since 1998
- Horst Hasselbach, local historian
- The Stieber Twins, rappers

== Bibliography ==
- Elmar Mittler (ed.): Heidelberg. Geschichte und Gestalt. Universitätsverlag C. Winter, Heidelberg 1996.
- Heidelberg West. Entwicklung eines Stadtteils. Festbuch zum 70jährigen Bestehen des Vereins West-Heidelberg. Heidelberg 1962.
- Stadt Heidelberg (ed.): Stadtteilrahmenplan Weststadt/Südstadt. Bestandsaufnahme, Prognose und Bewertung. Heidelberg 1995.
- Heidelberger Geschichtsverein e. V. (ed.): Heidelberg. Jahrbuch zur Geschichte der Stadt.
- Timo Hagen, Daniel Keller: Gesamtanlage „Weststadt Heidelberg“. Ein exemplarisches Beispiel gründerzeitlicher Stadterweiterung. In: Denkmalpflege in Baden-Württemberg. 41. Jg. 2012, Heft 4, pp. 200–206. (PDF)
- Wolf Deiseroth: Die Weststadt von Heidelberg. Ein Beispiel gründerzeitlicher Stadtentwicklung. In: Denkmalpflege in Baden-Württemberg. 9. Jg. 1980, Heft 2, pp. 37–50. (PDF)
