= Heidelberg-Kirchheim =

Kirchheim
- Stadtteil of Heidelberg
- Coat of arms

- Location of Kirchheim within Heidelberg
- Interactive map of Kirchheim
- Location within Germany Location within Baden-Württemberg
- Coordinates: 49°20′53″N 08°41′28″E
- Country: Germany
- State: Baden-Württemberg
- District: Rhein-Neckar-Kreis
- City: Heidelberg

Population (2021)
  - Total: 16,469
- Time zone: UTC+01:00 (CET)
  - Summer (DST): UTC+02:00 (CEST)
- Postal codes: 69124
- Dialling codes: 06221
- Website: www.hd-kirchheim.de

Kirchheim (German pronunciation: [ˈkɪʁçhaɪm], literally German for "Churchville") is a southern district town of the city of Heidelberg in north-west Baden-Württemberg, Germany.

== History ==
First traces of a settlement here derive from vessels found dating back to 3500-1800 BC. Germanic tribes settled here during the early Roman period known as the "neckarsuebische". The town is first mentioned in the year 767 AD as Chirichheim in the Lorsch Codex. It belonged to the Kurpfalz and formed the heart of an administrative unit called Zent. The early medieval village was composed of three fields, where related settlements were combined by the formation of a central church of representatives of the "fraenisch" kingdom. Hence the name Kirchheim.

The village was largely destroyed in the Thirty Years' War. Reconstruction efforts were subsequently thwarted when the village was once again burned during the Palatine war of succession. Kirchheim repopulated slowly, with 350 people in 1766 and 2,000 in 1861. The building of a station on the Rhine Valley Railway in 1865 brought industry to the village. In 1920 Kirchheim was annexed to Heidelberg, at which point building boomed and the population swelled to 8,000.

Today, Kirchheim has five buslines and one tramline. With a population of 16,469 (2021), it is the second most populous district of Heidelberg.

== Neighboring towns ==
The following towns or districts border Kirchheim: Leimen, Sandhausen, Rohrbach and Pleikartsfoersterhof, all part of the Rhein-Neckar-Kreis.

== Climate ==
Kirchheim has an oceanic climate (Köppen climate classification Cfb), defined by the protected valley between the Pfälzerwald and the Odenwald. Year-round, the mild temperatures are determined by maritime air masses coming from the west. In comparison to the nearby Upper Rhine Plain, Kirchheim's position in the valley leads to more frequent easterly winds than average. The hillsides of the Odenwald favour clouding and precipitation. The warmest month is July, and the coldest is January. Temperatures rising to more than 30 °C in midsummer are no rarity. According to the German Meteorological Service, nearby Heidelberg was the warmest place in Germany in 2009.

== Demographics ==
Although the majority of the population is ethnically German, Kirchheim does have a significant immigrant population from Turkey and the Balkans, as well as Italians, Indians, and Americans.

== Economy ==
Kirchheim is home to many small businesses. This includes shops, bakeries, restaurants, and hotels; as well as the Holiday Inn Heidelberg which is located on the northern part of town across from the SG Kirchheim sport complex. There is also a tram line and the Heidelberg Kirchheim/Rohrbach train station.

== Art and culture ==
Hip hop had a large influence on the cultural development of Kirchheim in the 1980s and 1990s. Perhaps because of the presence of the American Forces Network which broadcast rap music to US service members stationed in Europe, youth in Kirchheim emulated the music, forming their own rap groups and taking up graffiti art.

The Stieber Twins, a rap duo consisting of brothers Martin (Marshall Mar, aka Martin Jekyll) and Christian (Luxus Chris, aka Christian Hyde) are from Kirchheim. Painter Crew Kirchheim, a graffiti troupe originating on one of the town's main streets (Schwartzwald Strasse) was known for creating vandalistic artwork in public spaces.

== Athletics ==
Kirchheim is home to the Heidelberg Sharks of the German Rugby League, as well as two sporting clubs: Sportgemeinschaft Heidelberg-Kirchheim (SGK Heidelberg) which is known for its football and basketball clubs, and Frien Turner (FT) Kirchheim. There is also a horse riding club, Reit und Fahrverein Heidelberg-Kirchheim e.V., as well as a shooting club, Schützenverein 1906 e.V.

== Notable people ==
Due to the location of the headquarters of United States Army Europe in the neighboring Südstadt district of Heidelberg, Kirchheim was home to many Americans, such as foreign policy expert Alberto Lucini.
