= Ron George (American football) =

German gridiron football player (born 1970)

No. 50, 55
- Position: Linebacker

Personal information
- Born: March 20, 1970 (age 56); Heidelberg, West Germany
- Listed height: 6 ft 2 in (1.88 m)
- Listed weight: 243 lb (110 kg)

Career information
- High school: Heidelberg
- College: Air Force (1988); Stanford (1990–1992)
- NFL draft: 1993: 5th round, 121st overall pick

Career history
- Atlanta Falcons (1993–1996); Minnesota Vikings (1997); Kansas City Chiefs (1998–2000)

Awards and highlights
- Third-team All-American (1992); 2× First-team All-Pac-10 (1991, 1992)

Career NFL statistics
- Tackles: 198
- Sacks: 3
- Fumble recoveries: 5
- Stats at Pro Football Reference

Ronald Laroi George (born March 20, 1970) is a German-born former professional American football linebacker who played in the National Football League (NFL) from 1993 through 2000. He played college football at Stanford University and the United States Air Force Academy. He was an All-American in 1992 as a senior at Stanford. He was selected by the Atlanta Falcons in the fifth round of the 1993 NFL draft with the 121st overall pick.
