= Rory Ogle =

American politician (1954–2013)

Member of the New Mexico House of Representatives from the 28th district
- In office 2003–2005
- Preceded by: Joseph Mohorovic
- Succeeded by: Jimmie C. Hall

Personal details
- Born: July 6, 1954 Stillwater, Oklahoma, U.S.
- Died: February 9, 2013 (aged 58) Albuquerque, New Mexico, U.S.
- Party: Republican
- Children: 1
- Education: University of Northern Colorado

Military service
- Allegiance: United States
- Branch/service: United States Army
- Rank: Captain

Rory Ogle (1954 – 2013) was an American politician who served as a member of the New Mexico House of Representatives from 2003 to 2005. A member of the Republican Party, Ogle represented the 28th district.

== Early life and education ==
Ogle was born in 1954, the son of John D. Ogle, a member of the United States Armed Forces. He graduated from Heidelberg High School in Heidelberg, Germany. He attended The Citadel and graduated from the University of Northern Colorado. He then served as a captain in the United States Army. Ogle was also an Eagle Scout.

== Career ==
After leaving the Army, Ogle worked as a defense contractor and analyst for the Science Applications International Corporation in Virginia.

Ogle was elected to the New Mexico House of Representatives in 2002 and served for one term. During his tenure, Ogle was arrested on charges of domestic violence and aggravated battery against his wife, Anita. After his arrest, Ogle resigned from office and was succeeded by Jimmie Hall.

== Death ==
Ogle died of pneumonia in February 9, 2013 at the age of 58.
