= Jimmie C. Hall =

Member of the New Mexico House of Representatives

Jimmie Hall

Member of the New Mexico House of Representatives from the 28th district
- In office January 2005 – January 2019
- Preceded by: Rory Ogle
- Succeeded by: Melanie Stansbury

Personal details
- Born: Jimmie Charles Hall; November 29, 1947 (age 78) McCamey, Texas, U.S.
- Party: Republican
- Education: West Texas State University (BS, MA)

Military service
- Branch/service: United States Army
- Years of service: 1975–1977
- Rank: Second lieutenant

Jimmie Charles Hall (born November 29, 1947) is an American politician who served as a member of the New Mexico House of Representatives for District 28 from January 2005 to January 2019.

== Early life and education ==
Hall was born in McCamey, Texas. He earned a Bachelor of Science degree in animal science and a Master of Arts in agriculture from West Texas State University (now West Texas A&M University).

== Career ==
Prior to entering politics, Hall served in the United States Army and was the CEO of a bank.

=== Elections ===
- In 2004, District 28 incumbent Rory Ogle was unopposed for the June 1, 2004 Republican primary but withdrew. Hall replaced him on the November 2, 2004 General election ballot and was unopposed, winning with 9,338 votes.
- In 2006, Hall was unopposed for the June 6, 2006 Republican primary, winning with 1,104 votes and won the November 7, 2006 general election with 5,916 votes (56.4%) against Democratic nominee Shay Rose.
- In 2008, Hall and returning 2006 Democratic challenger Shay Rose were both unopposed for their June 8, 2008 primaries. Hall won the November 4, 2008 General election, winning with 7,274 votes (53.6%) against Rose.
- In 2010, Hall was challenged in the June 1, 2010 Republican primary but won with 2,292 votes (84.2%) and won the November 2, 2010 general election with 6,170 votes (60.9%) against Democratic nominee Cornelia Wells Lange.
- In 2012, Hall was unopposed for both the June 5, 2012 Republican Primary, winning with 1,948 votes and the November 6, 2012 General election, winning with 10,815 votes.
