= Heidelberg Middle School =

American school in Heidelberg, Germany

Heidelberg Middle School (HMS) was an American school in Heidelberg, Germany. The students attending HMS were the children of Department of Defense employees. Heidelberg Middle School was located on Patrick Henry Village. It had 650 students in grades 6-8. One-third of the children at the school rotated out of the school each year with their parents’ moves.

Heidelberg Middle School closed in August 2013 together with the rest of the US military installations in Heidelberg.
