= Helmholtz-Gymnasium Heidelberg =

School in Heidelberg, Germany

Coordinates: 49.23°N 8.41°E

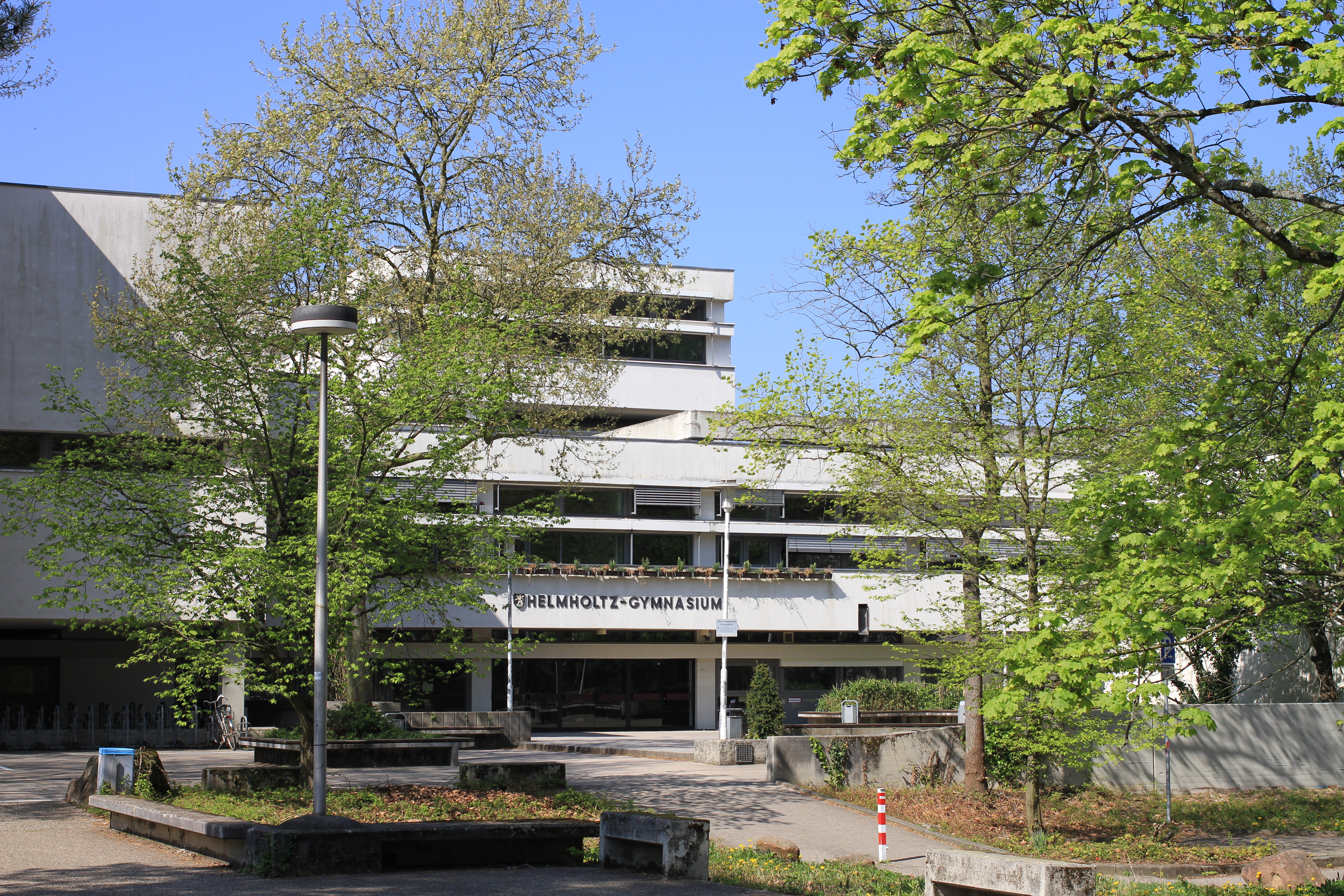
- Former names: Philipp Lenard Schule
- Type: Gymnasium
- Established: 23 November 1835; 190 years ago
- Students: 891 (as of 2018)
- Location: Südstadt, Heidelberg, Germany

Helmholtz-Gymnasium Heidelberg (HGH) is a state-funded gymnasium (grammar school) located on Rohrbacher Straße 102 in the Südstadt district of Heidelberg, Germany. Founded in 1835, it is now named Helmholtz-Gymnasium after Hermann von Helmholtz, but from 1927 until 1945 it was known as the Philipp Lenard Schule after Philipp Lenard. As of 2018, it had 891 pupils. In addition to its academic curriculum, it is designated by the German Olympic Sports Confederation as an "Eliteschule des Sports" (Elite Sports School).

== History ==
The school was founded on 23 November 1835 as a "Bürgerhochschule" (Higher Civic School), a new type of school designed to meet the needs of the merchant class by providing a broad-based education. It was housed in a building that had been constructed by the Jesuits in 1705 on Kettengasse in the old part of Heidelberg. Its first headmaster was Daniel Louis (1798–1848), a doctor of theology. Over the course of the 19th and early 20th centuries, more courses and year-levels were added until it reached Oberrealschule and then Gymnasium status in 1927. Girls were admitted to the school from 1905.

The school had no official name until 1937 when it was named Philipp Lenard Schule after the German physicist and Nobel Prize winner Philipp Lenard. The following year, under Nazi government education reforms, it was converted to an all-boys school. The school was closed during most of World War II. Many of its teachers and older pupils were serving in the army, and the school building itself was requisitioned by the German military. When the school reopened in September 1945, Philipp Lenard's name was removed. Lenard had been a prominent anti-Semite and an active proponent of Nazi ideology. The school's name was changed to Helmholtz-Gymnasium in honour of another German physicist, Hermann von Helmholtz, and it once again became co-educational.

During the post-war years, the school experienced increasing problems of over-crowding resulting in it having to operate on split sites and provide classes in shifts. The City of Heidelberg earmarked funds for a new school building in 1960. Construction began in 1965, and the new building opened on Rohrbacher Straße in 1969. As of 2018, 891 pupils were enrolled in the school.

== Curriculum ==
The school teaches the standard Gymnasium curriculum with specialties in languages and sports.

English, French, Spanish and Latin are taught as well as Turkish to students for whom it is their first language. Designated by the German Ministry of culture as a "Partnerschule für Europa" (Partner School for Europe), the school also provides bilingual English-German education in biology, geography, history and social studies for students who have been judged particularly gifted in languages.

Since 2003 Helmholtz-Gymnasium has been designated by the German Olympic Sports Confederation as an "Eliteschule des Sports" (Elite Sports School). The Eliteschule des Sports program is a network of schools which receive extra funding to combine training in competitive sports with education and housing. The program is designed to enable talented young athletes to train at a high level without sacrificing their education. The school's competitive sports program focuses on basketball, volleyball, rugby, hockey, gymnastics, swimming and athletics. It has a boarding facility for talented student athletes who come from outside Heidelberg, usually 25 to 30 each year.

Helmholtz-Gymnasium also has a "Landheim" (country home) in the Odenwald countryside near Waldbrunn. Acquired in the early 1960s and comprising three houses with classrooms, it is used by the school for residential field trips and nature study.

== Alumni ==
Notable alumni of Helmholtz-Gymnasium Heidelberg include:

- Boris Becker, tennis champion
- Theodor W. Hänsch, 2005 Nobel Prize laureate in physics
- Hansgünther Heyme, theatre director
- Albert Speer, architect and Reich Minister of Armaments and War Production for Nazi Germany
