= Heidelberg-Bergheim =

Bergheim
- Part of Heidelberg
- Interactive map of Bergheim
- Location within Germany Location within Baden-Württemberg
- Coordinates: 49°24′28″N 8°41′03″E
- Country: Germany
- State: Baden-Württemberg
- City: Heidelberg

Area
  - Total: 1.28 km^{2} (0.49 sq mi)

Population
  - Total: 6,872
  - Density: 5,370/km^{2} (13,900/sq mi)
- Time zone: UTC+01:00 (CET)
  - Summer (DST): UTC+02:00 (CEST)

Bergheim is a district of the German city of Heidelberg. It is bounded on the North by the Neckar River, the East by the Bismarkplatz, on the South by the Kurfürsten Anlage and the South by the city line. It is a mostly urban residential area, however the Bergheim Campus of the University of Heidelberg has numerous buildings in the district. Since March 2009 the Heidelberg University Faculty of Economics and Social Sciences has occupied the former Ludolf Krehl clinic (after Ludolf von Krehl). Bergheim also has a number of parks, both along the river and near the Stadtbücherei.

== Location ==
Bergheim is bordered by the Old Town to the east, the West Town to the south and the Neckar river to the north. To the west are Wieblingen-Süd with its rehab center (SRH) and Pfaffengrund. The settlement Ochsenkopf already belongs to Wieblingen.

Bergheim stretches along the banks of the Neckar. Bergheimer Strasse, which is centrally located and defines the district area with its starting and ending points, flows into the Federal Highway 656/Bundesstrasse 37 in the west and is bordered by Bismarckplatz in the east. It's one of Heidelberg's main traffic arteries.

The Bergheim district still contains areas of the so-called Alt Klinikum of the University Hospital (now partially converted into the Samariterhaus residential quarter) and Heidelberg Central Station. The largest employer here is the Stadtwerke Heidelberg. Furthermore, there are many office workplaces of other companies. Heidelberger Druckmaschinen AG maintained its headquarters in the Kurfürstenanlage for a long time, as well as its large research and development center in Bergheimer Strasse.

The southern boundary is the four- to six-lane Kurfürstenanlage, which begins at Bismarckplatz on the border with the old town and runs to the main train station.
