= Südstadt, Heidelberg =

Borough of Heidelberg, Germany

Südstadt
- Stadtteil of Heidelberg
- Coat of arms

- Location of Südstadt within Heidelberg
- Interactive map of Südstadt
- Location within Germany Location within Baden-Württemberg
- Coordinates: 49°23′37″N 08°41′9″E
- Country: Germany
- State: Baden-Württemberg
- City: Heidelberg

Area
  - Total: 1.73 km^{2} (0.67 sq mi)

Population (2021-12-31)
  - Total: 5,532
  - Density: 3,200/km^{2} (8,280/sq mi)
- Time zone: UTC+01:00 (CET)
  - Summer (DST): UTC+02:00 (CEST)
- Postal codes: 69126

Südstadt (German pronunciation: [ˈzyːtˌʃtat], lit. 'south city') is a district of the city of Heidelberg in Baden-Württemberg, Germany. It is a relatively young district and was established after World War II, by extending the Weststadt district to the south, and the Rohrbach district to the north. Today Südstadt has approximately 5,500 inhabitants making it the fourth smallest district in Heidelberg, after Bahnstadt , Boxberg , and Schlierbach.

== Location ==
Südstadt is divided into three main areas:

- East of Rohrbacher Straße (Südstadt-Ost). Developed with single-family detached houses and villas on the lower hillside.
- West of Rohrbacher Straße (Südstadt-West). Primarily developed with single-family homes and smaller apartment buildings, especially in the north and along the west side of Rohrbacher Straße. Also larger 3- to 6-story apartment buildings.
- To the west, the Campbell Barracks, once housing the Supreme Headquarters Allied Powers Europe and the Central European headquarters of NATO land forces. Also located here is former base housing for members of the US Armed Forces and their families (Mark Twain Village).

The areas formerly used by the US armed forces and NATO, including the Mark Twain Village, occupy about a third of Südstadt and significantly shape its character. Directly southwest of Campbell Barracks lies the small Bosseldorn industrial park with the remaining area west of the military sites containing allotment gardens and sports facilities. This area is known as the "Kirchheimer Loch" (Kirchheim Hole), being situated between several railway lines.

Südstadt also includes the park-like grounds of the Bergfriedhof cemetery, established in 1842, where numerous famous Heidelberg figures, such as Johann Heinrich Voss, Friedrich Ebert, Robert Bunsen, and Wilhelm Furtwängler are buried.

Südstadt is bordered to the North and West by railway lines. To the east, the boundary with the old town (Königstuhl district) follows several hiking trails on the southwestern foothills of Königstuhl hill. Since Rohrbach's incorporation into Heidelberg in 1929, the southern border with Rohrbach has been Sickingenstraße. Before 1929, the border between Heidelberg and Rohrbach lay approximately 200 meters to the north – along Saarstraße and Markscheide (boundary line), whose names still reflect the former border. Südstadt is politically represented by the Weststadt/Südstadt district council.

== History ==
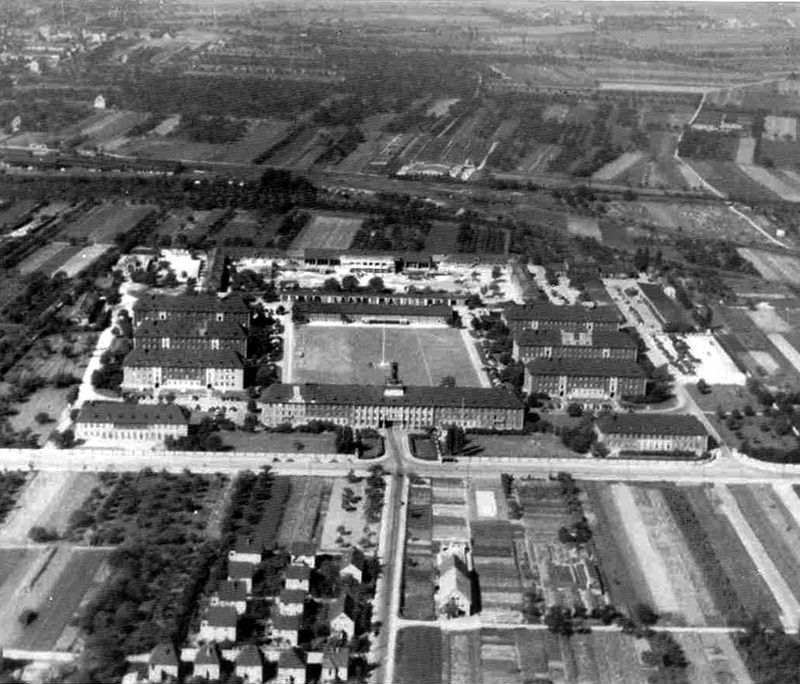
Großdeutschland-Kaserne/Campbell Barracks, 1945

Before World War II, the area between Weststadt and Rohrbach was used primarily for agriculture. Only a few buildings were constructed there, including Bethanien Hospital in 1931, some buildings on the hillside east of Rohrbacher Straße, and the Großdeutschland Barracks (now Campbell Barracks) in 1937. the After 1945, new residential areas were developed in the southern part of the city, partly as part of the 1950 Evacuation and Building Plan, as well as the residential areas of the Mark Twain Village around the Campbell Barracks. The renamed barracks were also expanded by the U.S. Military starting in this time. During the 1950s and 1960s, the southern part of the city thus developed into a distinct district.

Mark Twain Village was only clearly separated from the southern part of the city by fencing and other security measures in 2003, many of which still remain despite closure of the base.

== Infrastructure and schools ==
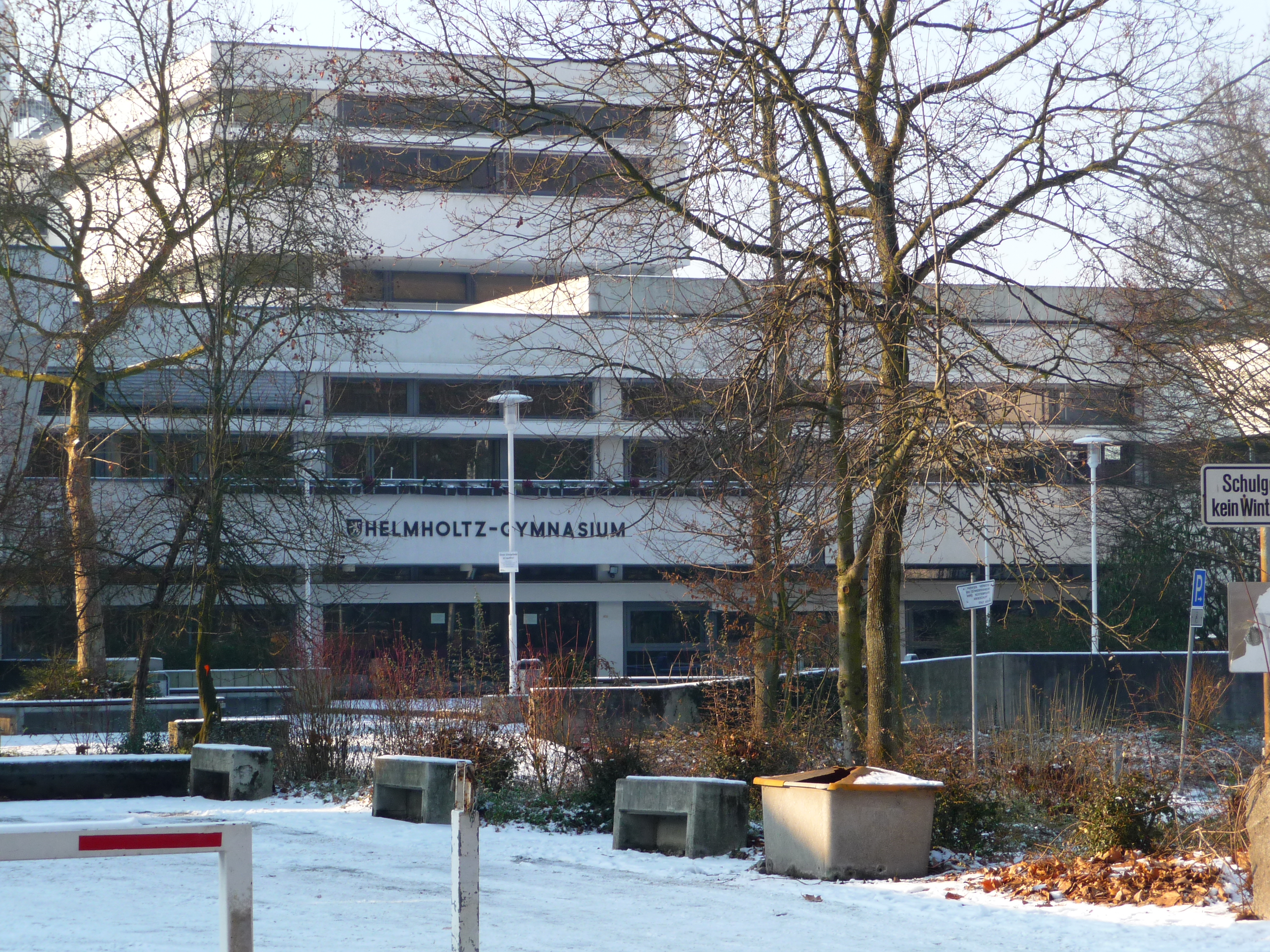
Helmholtz-Gymnasium

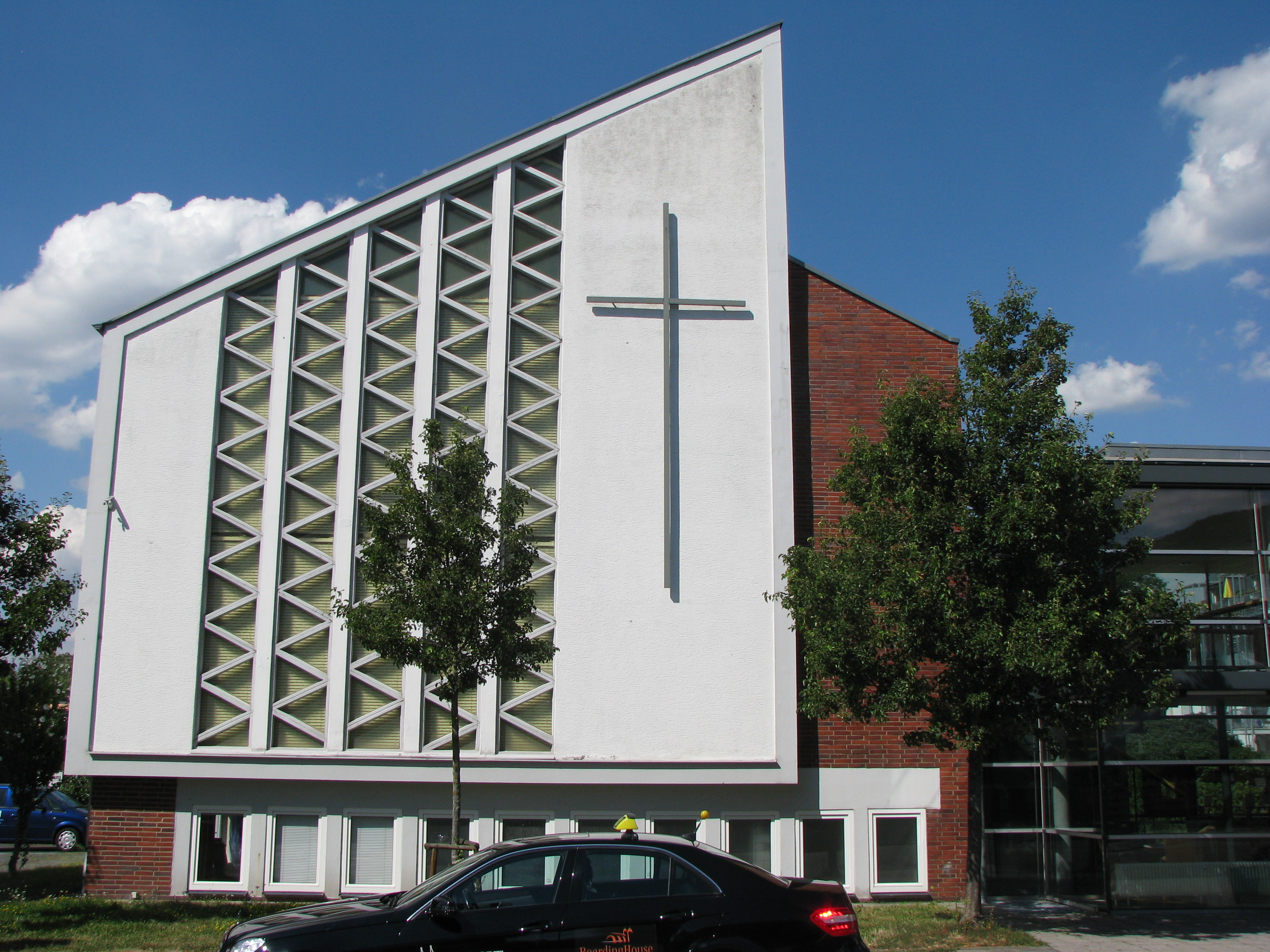
Hoffnungskirche

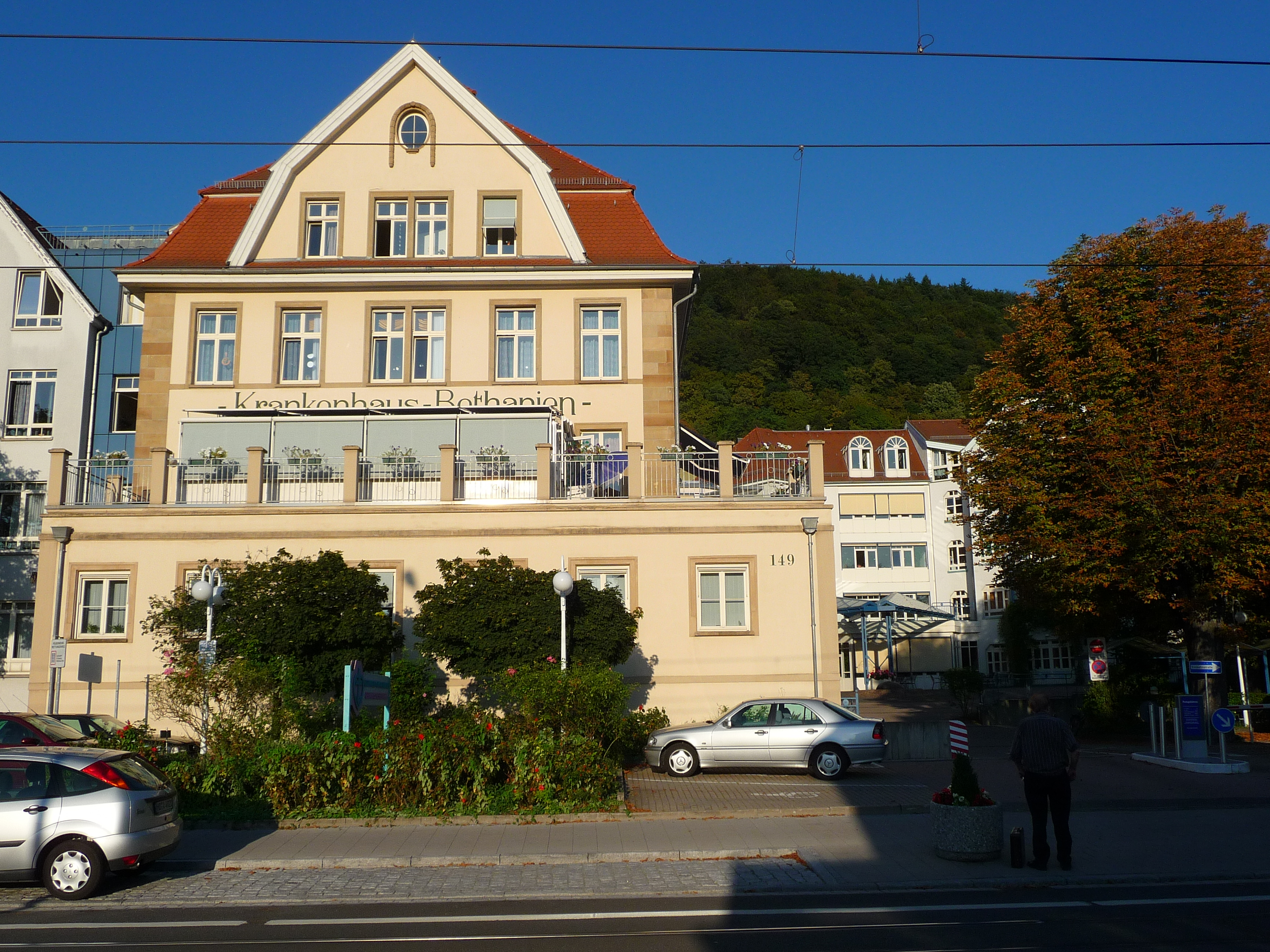
Bethanien Hospital

Südstadt lacks central squares or a true center, unlike many of Heidelberg's neighborhoods. The district is accessed exclusively from the north and south, oriented along the main thoroughfares of Rohrbacher Straße and Römerstraße, both of which connect to the western part of the city and Rohrbach. To the west, across the Heidelberg–Karlsruhe railway line, and to the east, towards the foothills of Königstuhl hill, there are a few scattered foot and cycle paths.

The majority of Südstadt is purely residential, with only a few commercial businesses. These are located almost exclusively along Rohrbacher Straße and in the Bosseldorn industrial park southwest of Campbell Barracks. Through a recent redevelopment of the Campbell Barracks for private use, several commercial businesses have been added. These are mainly restaurants or other culinary establishments.

Two of Heidelberg's grammar schools are located in this district: the state-run Helmholtz Grammar School and the state-recognized private Englisches Institute Grammar School. Additionally, the Mark Twain Village was home to Heidelberg High School, the only high school in Heidelberg for family members of U.S. military personnel. This school closed when the land was transferred to the Institute for Federal Real Estate. Since summer 2017, the Julius Springer School has occupied the former buildings.

Südstadt also has a public primary school, the Pestalozzi School, and the private primary school of the aforementioned English Institute. The free private Montessori School Heidelberg is located in Südstadt as well, with approximately 50 students. The district also has the independent school Lernzeiträume, which teaches according to the Jena Plan.

In Südstadt there is a student residence run by the Heidelberg Student Union as well as several other privately run student residences.

The US-American University College Europe of the University of Maryland is located in the Bosseldorn industrial park.

Südstadt is served by the Protestant St. Mark's parish and community center, the Catholic parish of St. Michael built in 1963, and the Baptist church of Hope, also built in 1963, as well as the now deconsecrated chapel of the Mark Twain Village. On the opposite side of Rheinstraße is a local shopping center, with the Caroline Sammet Südstadt Residence nursing home, run by the Heidelberg Protestant City Mission's senior care services, located above.

Today, Bethanien Hospital operates as a geriatric specialist hospital, and is still located in Südstadt.

== Transport in Südstadt ==
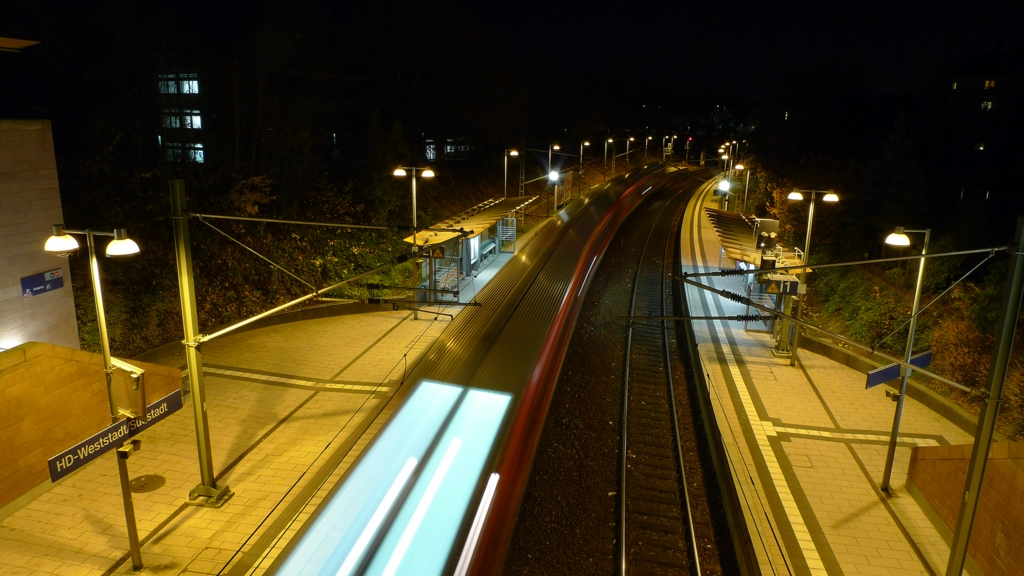
S-Bahnhof Weststadt-Südstadt

Südstadt is well served by public transport via the VRN (Rhine-Neckar Transport Association) with tram lines 23 and 24 (formerly lines 3 and 4) along Rohrbacher Straße, and bus lines 29, 28 and 757 along Römerstraße. Südstadt is also connected to Heidelberg's weekend night bus network via the Moonliner 1. The Weststadt/Südstadt S-Bahn station is located on the border with the western part of the city, to the North.
