= Patrick Henry Village =

Quarter of Heidelberg, Baden-Württemberg, Germany

Coordinates: 49°22′41″N 8°37′44″E

Location within Heidelberg. PHV is dark red.

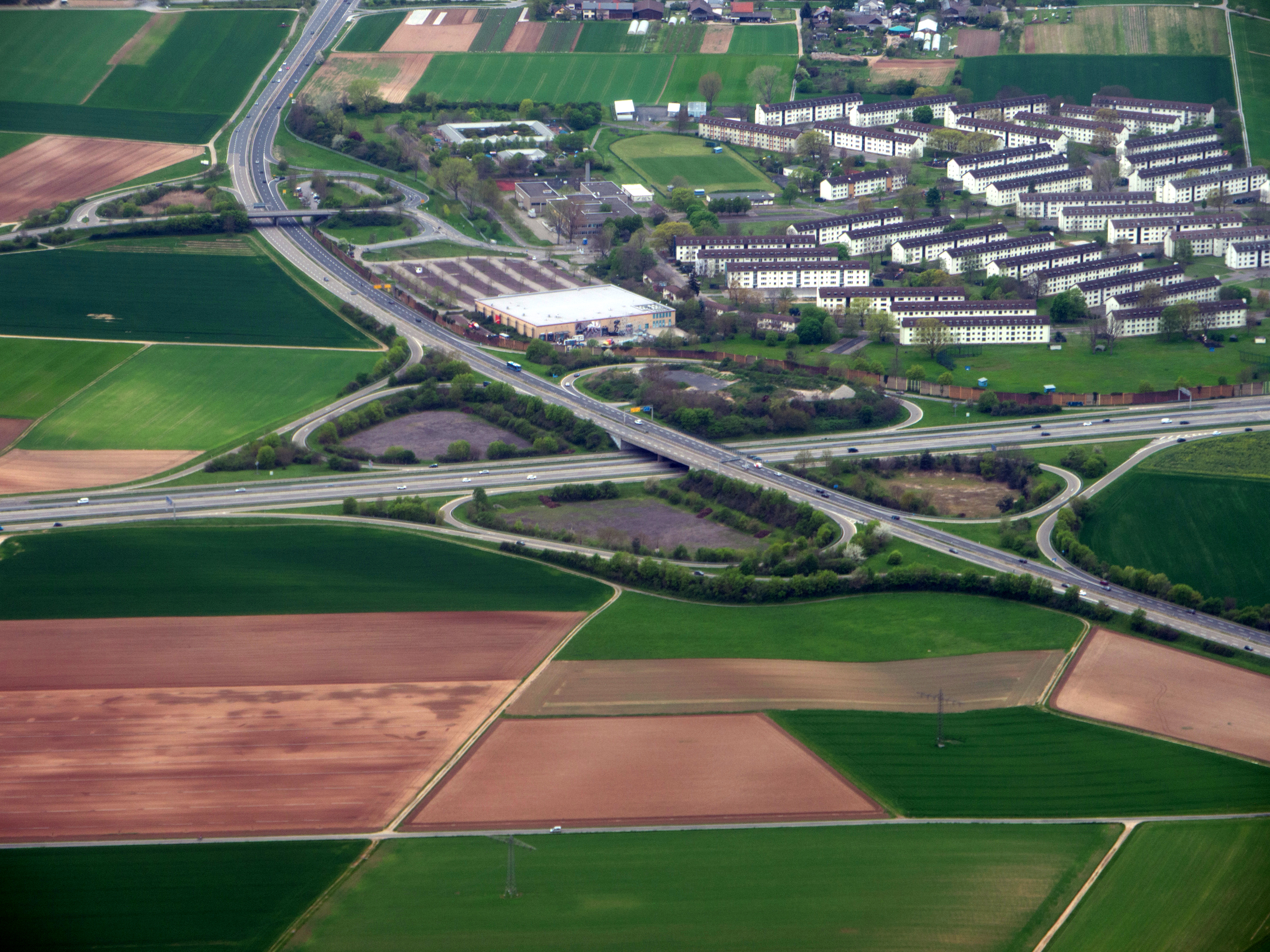

Patrick Henry Village (PHV), was a United States Army family housing area located in the vicinity of Heidelberg, Germany, adjacent to and just south of the small town of Eppelheim. It opened in 1947 after World War II and was named after Patrick Henry, first and sixth Governor of Virginia.

PHV was at its height populated with up to 16,000 Americans. The housing area closed on 6 September 2013.

For the vast majority of its existence, PHV was not fenced, gated, or in any other way not completely open to entry and transit by the general public. After the September 11, 2001, attacks in the United States, fences were built around the living quarters so that no one could enter without an authorized U.S. government ID card. Also, the yearly German-American 'Volksfest' was moved to nearby Patton Barracks, for security reasons.

In 2002, the US Army planned a large extension of the housing area. However, soon afterwards the Army announced the closure of all Heidelberg and Mannheim facilities.

Patrick-Henry-Village was officially closed on September 6, 2013, after all military personnel were moved to the new headquarters of the United States European Command at Wiesbaden. On 2 June 2014, the site was transferred to the Institute for Federal Real Estate.

== Former facilities ==
In its final state, Patrick Henry Village had a large number of educational, recreational and public facilities as well as shops and dining facilities. Schools included Patrick Henry Elementary School (Grades K-5) and Heidelberg Middle School (Grades 6-8), as well as a guest Canadian elementary/middle school (Grades K-8) for the children of Canadian military personnel. Recreational facilities included a gym, a bowling alley, a miniature golf course, a movie theater, tennis courts and baseball fields, the Heidelberg Non-Commissioned Officer's Club, aka "Old Dominion Club" and the Heidelberg Commissioned Officer's Club. Public services included a clinic for dentistry, a barbershop, a library, a post office, and a Roman Catholic and Protestant church.

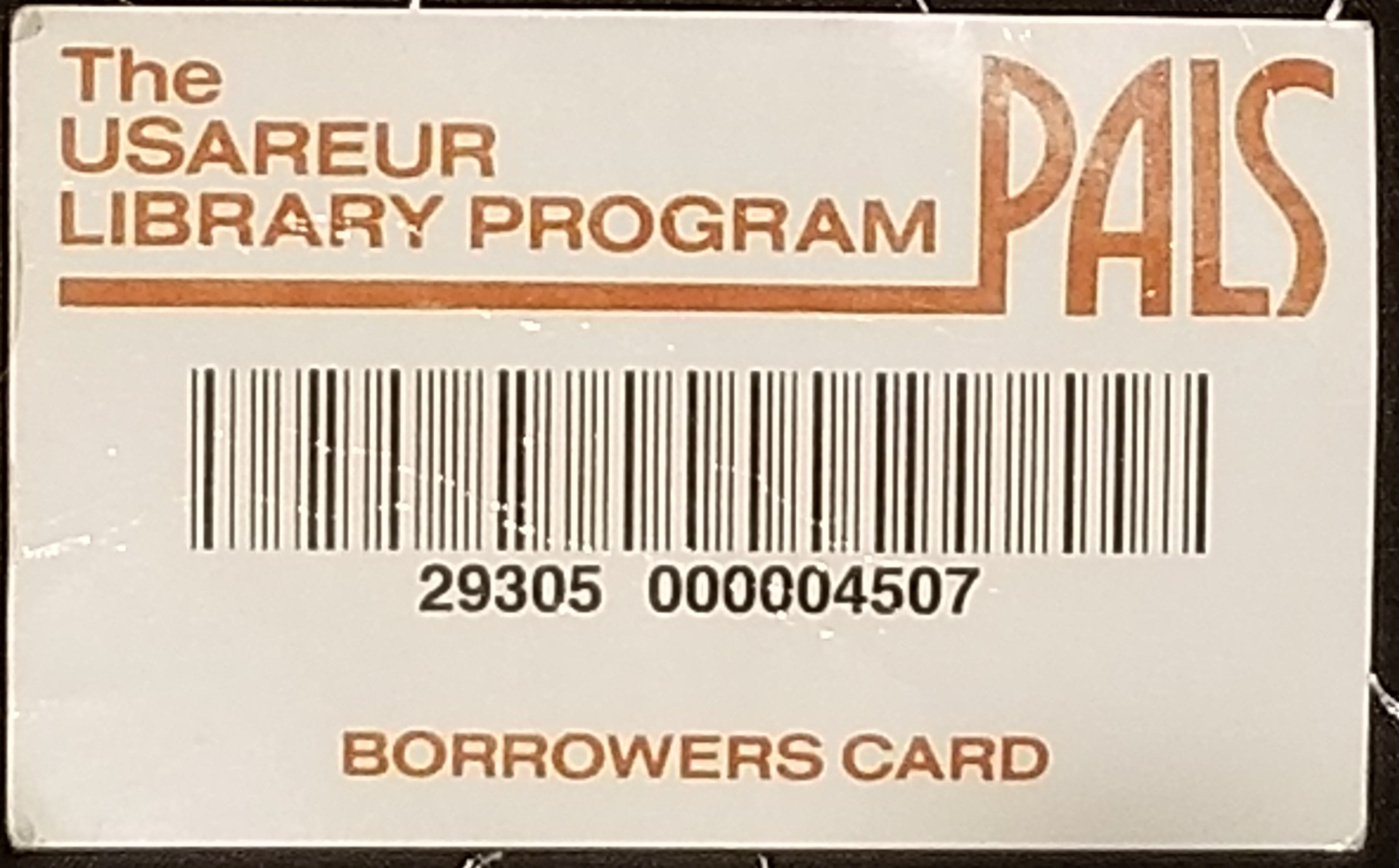
Patrick Henry Village Library Card (defunct)

== Present usage ==
At the end of 2014, parts of the installation were used as an emergency shelter for refugees as a reaction to the refugee crisis. From summer 2015 on, the shelter was extended to the Bedarfsorientierte Erstaufnahmeeinrichtung Heidelberg in order to house and process asylum seekers according to the regular procedure with a capacity of ca. 4.000 persons (as of October 2015). The Minister of Science of Baden-Württemberg Theresia Bauer demanded the restoration of more buildings in PHV so that more refugees can be housed there, but Heidelberg's Deputy Mayor Eckart Würzner objected her request and insisted on a decentralized accommodation within Heidelberg as well as on a fairer distribution of refugees in Baden-Württemberg. The federal government of Baden-Württemberg decided regardless that Patrick-Henry-Village should become the central processing hub for three-fourths of all refugees of the southwest. It was planned that refugees should pass 40 procedures there, which combine the identification, health check, registration and application for asylum. Furthermore, asylum applicants who were sent to the rural districts get cited to appear at Patrick Henry Village again for their asylum hearing to take place.

== See also ==
- List of United States Army installations in Germany
