= Campbell Barracks =

Former barracks in Heidelberg, Germany

Coordinates: 49.3867°N 8.6842°E

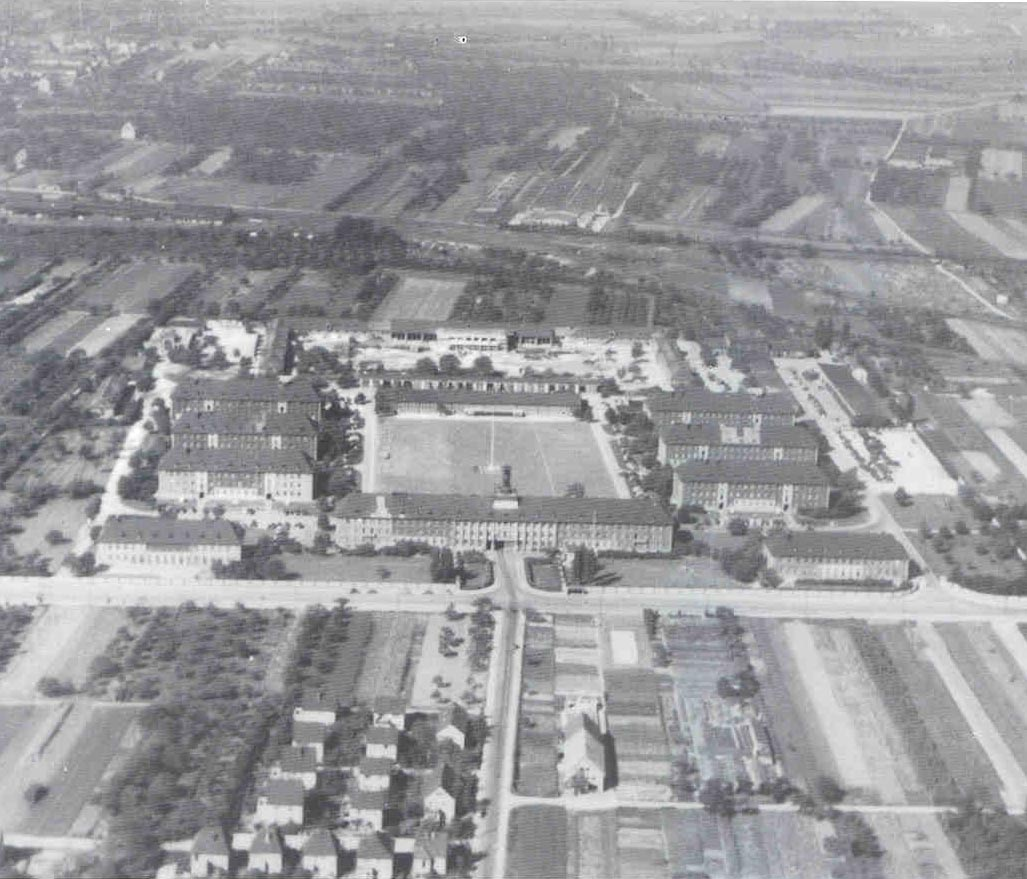
Campbell Barracks, circa 1945

Campbell Barracks, in Heidelberg, Germany, was home to Headquarters, United States Army Europe (USAREUR) from 1948 to 2013. It was also home to Headquarters, V Corps and Headquarters, Allied Force Command Heidelberg.

== History ==
As part of the German rearmament, the German 110th Infantry Regiment was activated in May 1936 and stationed in Heidelberg. The existing Grenadier-Kaserne (now Patton Barracks) was not large enough for the regiment. Accordingly, a new installation was built in 1937 on what was then farmland on the southern outskirts of Heidelberg near the suburb of Rohrbach.

At first unnamed, the new installation was designated Großdeutschland-Kaserne after Austria became part of Nazi Germany in March 1938. Stories linking Großdeutschland-Kaserne to the Großdeutschland Division of World War II have no foundation. The casern predates the division, which was not formed until May 1942. Neither the division nor any of its subordinate units were ever stationed in Heidelberg, nor was the 110th Infantry Regiment ever attached to the Großdeutschland-Division.

When completed, the new Heidelberg barracks became the home of the 110th Infantry's headquarters, its 1st Battalion and its two regimental support companies. The regiment's 2d Battalion was stationed at Loretto-Kaserne (now called Hammonds Barracks) in Seckenheim and the 3d Battalion at Grenadier-Kaserne. The Keyes Building on Campbell originally served as the regimental officers mess.

The first Allied troops entered Heidelberg on the morning of Good Friday, March 30, 1945, and the city surrendered without a fight. The Wehrmacht had left Heidelberg a day earlier but not before blowing up the bridges crossing the River Neckar, which in Heidelberg meant blowing up the old bridge.

The U.S. units that initially occupied Großdeutschland-Kaserne are not known, but by V-E Day, 8 May 1945, the headquarters of the U.S. 6th Army Group occupied the Kaserne. The Army Group headquarters was inactivated in June 1945, whereupon the headquarters of the U.S. Seventh Army moved from Augsburg to Heidelberg, officially opening at Großdeutschland-Kaserne on July 22, 1945.

The Seventh Army headquarters remained in Heidelberg until its inactivation on 31 March 1946. The headquarters of the U.S. Third Army then moved from Bad Tölz to Großdeutschland-Kaserne on 2 April 1946. In the meantime the Third Army had activated a new organization on 15 February 1946 called the U.S. Constabulary. The Constabulary was basically a police force with the mission of maintaining law and order in the U.S. Zone of occupied Germany. On February 15, 1947, the Constabulary headquarters moved from Bamberg to Großdeutschland-Kaserne and the Third Army headquarters was inactivated on March 15, 1947.

During this time the headquarters of the U.S. Army in Europe, then known as the U.S. Forces, European Theater (USFET), was stationed in Frankfurt in the IG Farben Building (the Abrams Building). The same day Third Army headquarters was inactivated, USFET was redesignated as the European Command (EUCOM), not to be confused with the joint United States European Command (USEUCOM) of today.

In the series of phased moves between February and June 1948, the Constabulary headquarters moved from Heidelberg to Stuttgart and the EUCOM headquarters moved into the vacated facilities at Großdeutschland-Kaserne.

The Kaserne was formally renamed Campbell Barracks on August 23, 1948 in memory of Staff Sergeant Charles L. Campbell, 14th Infantry Regiment, 71st Infantry Division, who was awarded the Distinguished Service Cross posthumously for extraordinary heroism. On March 28, 1945, two days before the surrender of Heidelberg, Staff Sergeant Campbell led a patrol across the Rhine River near Mannheim and was killed while covering the withdrawal of his patrol as it returned to the west bank with valuable information.

Until July 1949, the Commander in Chief, EUCOM, was also the U.S. Military Governor of occupied Germany. His office and staff were in Berlin. The ranking officer in Heidelberg was the EUCOM Chief of Staff. While Lieutenant General Clarence R. Huebner was the EUCOM Chief of Staff, the riding hall in building 31 was converted to the Wilson Theater, a protected monument building because of the wooden architecture of its roof, which opened on March 4, 1949.

=== Joint Headquarters ===
The next significant organizational change came on August 1, 1952 when a new joint headquarters, the United States European Command (USEUCOM), was activated in Frankfurt. At the same time, the EUCOM headquarters in Heidelberg was redesignated the United States Army, Europe (USAREUR). A small NATO planning cell called the CENTAG Plans Staff was also established at this time within the USAREUR headquarters staff, with the Commander in Chief, USAREUR, given the additional title of Commander, CENTAG (COMCENTAG). In April 1959, the CENTAG Plans Staff was designated Headquarters, CENTAG, and separated from the USAREUR headquarters staff. The USAREUR G3 (as the Deputy Chief of Staff, Operations, was then known) nevertheless continued to serve as the CENTAG Chief of Staff while serving as the USAREUR G3.

The Supreme Allied Commander, Europe (SACEUR), formally activated a separated CENTAG headquarters on 1 October 1960. Between June and August 1961 the CENTAG headquarters staff moved from Campbell Barracks to Hammond Barracks in Seckenheim.

On December 1, 1966, the Seventh Army headquarters (which had been reactivated in Stuttgart in November 1950) merged with the USAREUR headquarters. This new headquarters was designated Headquarters, United States Army, Europe, and Seventh Army (HQ USAREUR/7A).

In the late 1970s, a series of studies concluded that interallied coordination would be improved by stationing three international NATO headquarters on the same installation with HQ USAREUR/7A. This resulted in the headquarters of the Fourth Allied Tactical Air Force (4ATAF) moving into building 8 of Campbell Barracks in September 1980. The CENTAG headquarters returned to Campbell Barracks in December 1980, occupying offices in buildings 3,5, and 7 (with an office for the CENTAG Chief of Staff in building 1). Finally, the headquarters of the Allied Command Europe Mobile Force (Land) moved to Campbell Barracks in December 1980, occupying part of building 7.

=== Post Cold War ===
In the late 1980s and early 1990s, the collapse of the Berlin Wall, the demise of the Soviet Union, and the dissolution of the East European Communist Bloc radically changed the politico-military situation in Europe. In addition to significant reductions and realignments of U.S. Forces in Germany, a number of changes occurred in the NATO military organizational structure, all of which affected stationing at Campbell Barracks.

On 30 June 1993 CENTAG and 4ATAF discontinued operations. On July 1, 1993, the headquarters of NATO's Allied Land Forces Central Europe (LANDCENT) became operational on Campbell Barracks with a staff from seven nations (Belgium, Canada, Denmark, Germany, The Netherlands, the United Kingdom, and the United States). LANDCENT moved into offices in buildings 3,7, and 8, formerly used by CENTAG and 4ATAF. The CENTAG Chief of Staff office suite in building 1 was returned to USAREUR. In the summer of 1994, V Corps headquarters moved from Frankfurt to Campbell Barracks.

The departure from the Cold War era brought the implementation of a new NATO Integrated Military Structure and LandCENT was formally designated Joint Headquarters Centre (JHQ CENT) in a ceremony held on March 9, 2000. The new structure, which accompanied this designation, included personnel from five additional nations: the Czech Republic, Hungary, Italy, Norway, and Poland - making a total of 12 NATO Nations contributing to the Headquarters.

The devastation caused in the September 11, 2001 attacks sent shock waves through the military and on April 30, 2002 the Lieutenant General Timothy J. Maude Center for Human Resources was dedicated to Timothy Maude (November 18, 1947 - September 11, 2001) in his honor. He was the highest-ranking military officer killed in the attacks at the Pentagon. He worked on Campbell Barracks from 1995 to 1998 as Deputy Chief of Staff for Personnel and Installation Management. It was his last assignment before being stationed in Washington D.C.

On July 1, 2004, the Headquarters once again transitioned in a ceremony marking its designation to Component Command-Land Headquarters, Heidelberg. New structure is currently represented by 15 NATO nations, including its newest members Lithuania and Slovakia. This transformation to CC-Land HQ HD was part of a major NATO restructuring, and realized a fundamental change in headquarters mission and operations, as this headquarters turns its focus from one of six joint sub-regional command headquarters, to assume roles as one of only two land centric headquarters in the NATO command structure designed to provide expeditionary command and control at the operational level of conflict.

With this increased operational focus, there remains the critical element of promoting enhanced interoperability and standardization through provisions of land advice and guidance within Allied Command for Operations. Headquarters will also work closely with Allied Command for Transformation on aspects such as land concept development, exercises and training. Within JFC Brunssum, headquarters serves as the principal focus for all land matters. CC-Land HQ HD has conducted work in the fields of land-based operational planning, intelligence, logistics, command and control, training and exercises.

== Closure ==
In 2010, the US Army announced that Campbell Barracks would close, with the troop drawdown process completed by no later than 2015. NATO central army operations were relocated to Izmir, Turkey in March 2013. Flags were lowered for the last time at Campbell Barracks on 6 September 2013, with all personnel already re-located to Wiesbaden Army Airfield. According to The New York Times, closure will save the Pentagon $112 million a year, mostly in costly security expenses for several scattered facilities. As the headquarters of the United States Army in Europe, the Barracks issued the orders for the millions of American soldiers – 15 million in Germany alone – who have served in Europe since 1945. The US Army is now concentrated in just five key locations in Germany, with its new European headquarters in Wiesbaden. The base will be turned over to the German government.
