= Tulu Nadu state movement =

Formation of separate Tulu Nadu state from Karnataka and Kerala

Tulu Nadu in purple with respect to rest of Karnataka (yellow) and Kerala (grey)

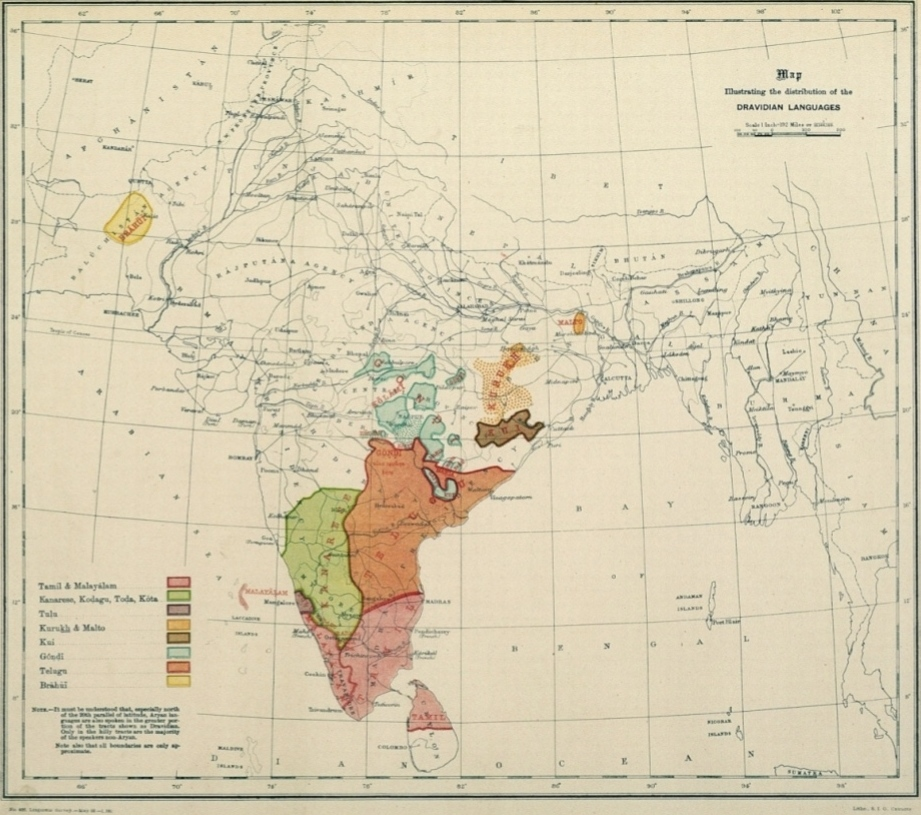
Map Showing distribution of Dravidian languages in 1913

Tulu Nadu State movement is aimed at increasing Tulu Nadu's influence and political power through the formation of separate Tulu Nadu state from Karnataka and Kerala. Tulu Nadu is a region on the south-western coast of India. It consists of the Dakshina Kannada and Udupi districts of Karnataka and Kasargod district in Kerala. Chandragiri River has traditionally been considered a boundary between Tulu Nadu and Kerala from the fourth century AD onwards. The first call for a separate Tulu Nadu state was made just after the Quit India Movement in 1942 by Srinivas Updhyaya Paniyadi, a banker and a press owner from Udupi. Mangaluru is the largest and the chief city of Tulu Nadu. Tulu activists have been demanding a separate Tulu Nadu state since the late 2000s, considering language and culture as the basis for their demand.

Several major powers ruled Tulu Nadu, including the Kadambas, Alupas, Vijayanagara dynasty, and the Keladi Nayakas. However, epigraphic evidence, including inscriptions published in Epigraphia Carnatica, shows that Kannada, along with Sanskrit, was majorly used in administration and official records under the Kadambas, Alupas, and Keladi Nayakas; the Vijayanagara Empire likewise issued numerous inscriptions in Kannada in addition to Telugu, Sanskrit, and Tamil as part of its multilingual administrative system. The region was unified with the state of Mysore (now called Karnataka) in 1956. The region encompassing Tulu Nadu formerly comprised the district of South Canara. Tulu Nadu is demographically and linguistically diverse, with several languages commonly spoken and understood, including Tulu, Kundagannada, Konkani, and Beary.

== Distinct identity ==
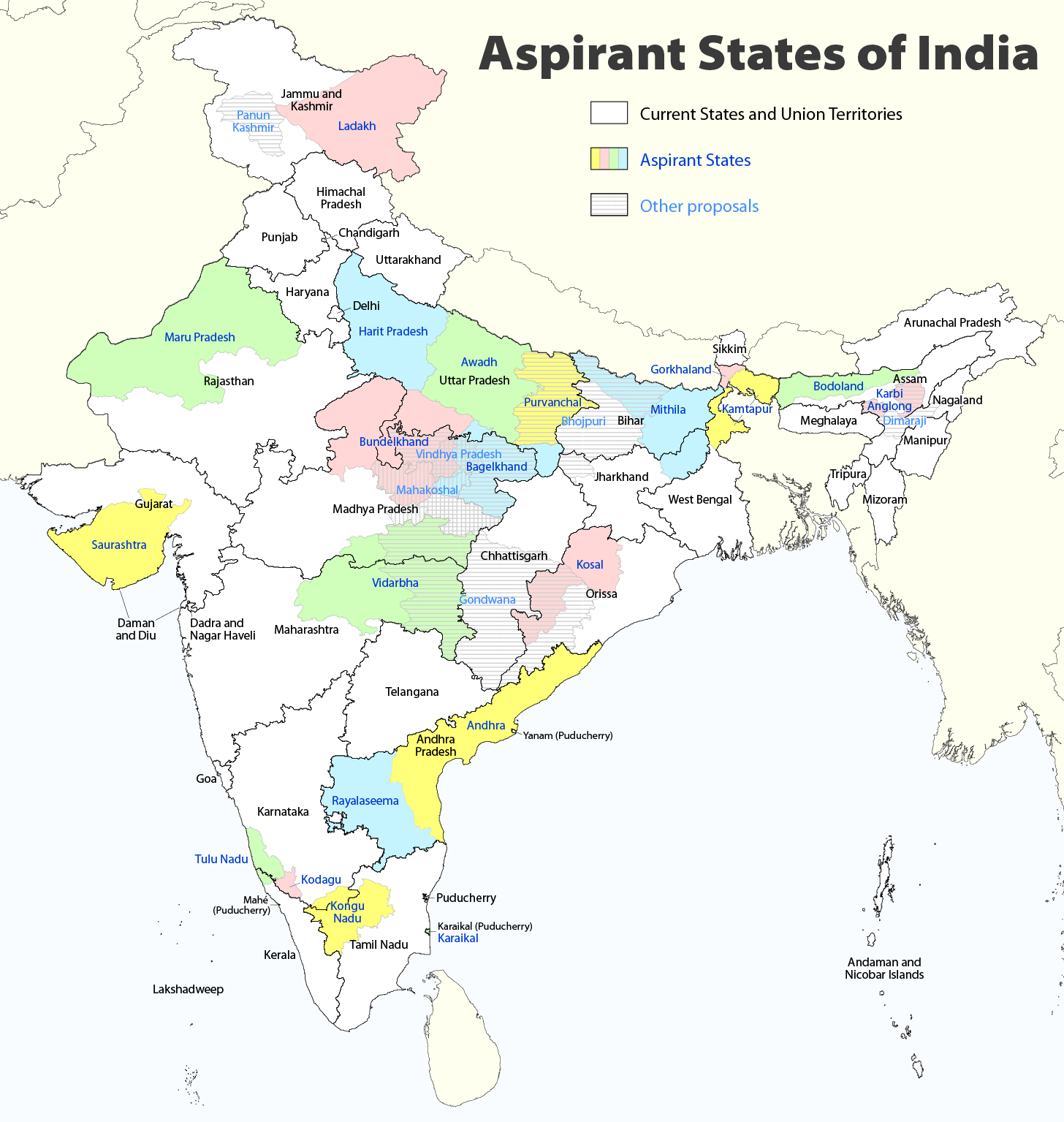
Tulu Nadu is shown with other aspirant states of India.

According to the 1961 Census of India statistics, Tulu speakers (67.27 percent) constituted the majority of the population of Dakshina Kannada, followed by Konkani (20.62 percent). As per the latest(2011) census of India statistics, Tulu speakers remained at 48.5 percent in Dakshina Kannada district. While in Udupi, Kannada Speakers remained at 42.7 percent. The predominant languages in Tulu Nadu are Tulu, Kundagannada, Konkani, Malayalam, and Beary, with Tulu being the lingua franca in Mangaluru and some parts of Udupi district.

Hinduism is followed by many of the population, with Billavas, Devadigas, Bunts, Mogaveeras (Native Tuluvas). Kota Brahmins, Kulalas, Ganiga, Vokkaliga and Koteshwara Brahmins (Native Kannadigas), Shivalli Brahmins, Sthanika Brahmins (Tulu), Vishwa Brahmins (Kannada, Tulu) Havyaka Brahmins (Havyakannada - a dialect of Kannada), Karhade Brahmins (Marathi) Goud Saraswat Brahmins (Konkani), Daivadnya Brahmins (Konkani), and Rajapur Saraswat Brahmins (Konkani) also form significant sections of the Hindu population.

Christians form a sizeable section of Mangalorean society, with Konkani-speaking Catholics, popularly known as Mangalorean Catholics, accounting for the largest Christian community in Tulu Nadu. Protestants in Tulu Nadu, known as Mangalorean Protestants, typically speak Kannada. Most Muslims in Tulu Nadu are Bearys, who speak Beary Bashe. There is also a sizeable community of landowners following Jainism, known as the Tulu Jains.

== Reasons ==
As a result of the States Reorganisation Act (1956), South Canara (part of the Madras Presidency under the British) was incorporated into the dominion of the newly created Mysore State (now called Karnataka). Although Tulu Nadu has a distinct cultural and linguistic identity, a separate state was not created to form the independence. Tuluva activists had raised serious issues on the development of Mangaluru and Tulu Nadu. One of them was that the Karnataka State Government has been focusing only on the development of Bengaluru, the capital of Karnataka, and its periphery, and cities such as Mangaluru and Udupi in Tulu Nadu were grossly neglected. They also alleged that the Government had "totally neglected" Dakshina Kannada and Udupi districts. They also alleged that the Kerala Government showed similar attitudes towards the northern parts of Kasargod district.

The Tulu Rajya Horata Samiti, active in the Dakshina Kannada, Udupi, and Kasaragod districts, advocates self-rule as the only solution for the region's much-awaited developmental works. The Samithi rejected the initiative of the Karnataka State Government to change the name of Mangalore to Mangaluru. It insisted that if it is changed, it should be changed as Kudla. Other demands are renaming Mangaluru International Airport as "Koti Chennaya International Airport". Samiti aims to create awareness among the Tulu-speaking people about the "inevitability of a separate state and enthusing them to fight for the cause."

In the early 21st century, the Tulu Nadu movement gained momentum in the region with support from notable Mangalorean Kannada poet Kayyara Kinyanna Rai and former Member of Parliament Ramanna Rai. In an interview, Kinyanna Rai said, "political boundaries might not mean anything to people who were fighting for the survival of a language and its culture. Karnataka and Kerala governments spoke about "Tier-II cities" and the "Smart City" concept, but investment was not forthcoming." In another interview, Ramanna Rai said that "the work on the Mangaluru–Bangaluru railway line was completed after 35 years of its launch." He also said that "he would not accept the laying of a meter gauge line between the two cities and converting it into broad gauge as a development project particularly when there was no rail link for nine years."

In 2008, the former president of the Kannada Sahitya Parishat, Harikrishna Punaroor stated:

"All Tulu organisations from Dakshina Kannada, Udupi and Kasaragod districts will meet shortly to chart out a plan for a separate State and to take it up with the Centre. The people of these districts had a legitimate reason to seek a separate State. [Noting that most States came into being on the basis of linguistic consideration] people from Tulu-speaking areas too could stake a claim in this regard. Tulu is one of the five Dravidian languages with its own script. The demand for the inclusion of Tulu in the Eighth Schedule of the Constitution had not materialised over the years due to the apathy of the State and Union governments. Creating a separate State would give a fillip to the growth and sustenance of Tulu. It was the responsibility of elected representatives from the region to press for this cause. If the Government failed to fulfil their demand, an organised agitation would be inevitable."

== Mahajan Panel Report ==
The issue of bifurcation and merger of the northern part of Kasaragod district (to the north of the Chandragiri river) with Karnataka, as recommended by the Justice Mahajan Commission as early as 1968, was discussed in Lok Sabha elections in 2004.

United Democratic Front (UDF) candidate N. A. Muhammed, in an interview with The Hindu, said he would not do anything that would distort or topple a bill favouring the implementation of the Mahajan Commission report. He also said he would not press for implementing the Mahajan Commission report but would certainly not act against it if such a bill was moved in the Parliament.

== See also ==
- Belgaum border dispute
- Kaveri River water dispute
- Gokak agitation
