= Communities of Tulu Nadu =

This is a list of communities of Tulu Nadu, a Tulu-speaking region spread over parts of present Karnataka, India (In alphabetical order).

1. Billava
2. Bunt
3. Daivadnya Brahmin
4. Devadiga
5. Goud Saraswat Brahmins
6. Tulu Gowda
7. Koraga
8. Kota Brahmins
9. Mera
10. Mogaveera
11. Moolya
12. Sapaliga/Sapalya
13. Shettigar
14. Shivalli Brahmins
15. Sthanika Brahmins
16. Kottari/Kotari
