= South Canara =

- District of Madras Presidency
- Interactive map of South Canara
- Coordinates: 13.00°N 75.40°E
- Country: British Raj
- Presidency: Madras

Area
  - Total: 8,441 km^{2} (3,259 sq mi)

Population (2001)
  - Total: 3,005,897
  - Density: 356.1/km^{2} (922/sq mi)

Languages
  - Administrative: English, Kannada, Malayalam
  - Spoken languages: Tulu, Konkani, Kannada, Malayalam, Marathi, Hindustani, Beary, Arebashe
- Time zone: UTC+5:30 (IST)
- ISO 3166 code: ISO 3166-2:IN
- Vehicle registration: KA-19, KA-20, KA-21, KA-62, KL-14
- Largest city: Mangalore

South Canara (South Kannada) was a district of the Madras Presidency of British Raj, located at 13.00°N 75.40°E. It comprised the towns of Kasaragod and Udupi and adjacent villages, with the administration at Mangalore city. South Canara was one of the most heterogeneous areas of Madras Presidency, with Tulu, Malayalam, Kannada, Konkani, Marathi, Hindustani, and Beary languages being spoken while English, Kannada and Malayalam remained the official languages. It was succeeded by the Tulu-speaking areas of Dakshina Kannada district, the Malayalam-speaking area of Kasaragod district and the Amindivi islands sub-division of the Laccadives, in the year 1956.

== Geography ==
Mangalore was the administrative headquarters of the district. The district covered an area of 10,410 square kilometres (4,021 sq mi).

South Canara District was bordered by North Canara to north, the princely state of Mysore to east, Coorg state to southeast, Malabar District to south, and Arabian Sea to west. South Canara was one of the two districts on the western coast (Malabar coast) of Madras Presidency along with Malabar District (otherwise known as Malayalam District).

== History ==
South Canara was annexed by the British East India Company following the defeat of Tipu Sultan in the Fourth Mysore War in 1799 and along with North Kanara formed the district of Kanara in the Madras Presidency. In 1859, Kanara was split into two districts, North and South. North Kanara was transferred to the Bombay Presidency, and South was retained by Madras.

== Taluks ==
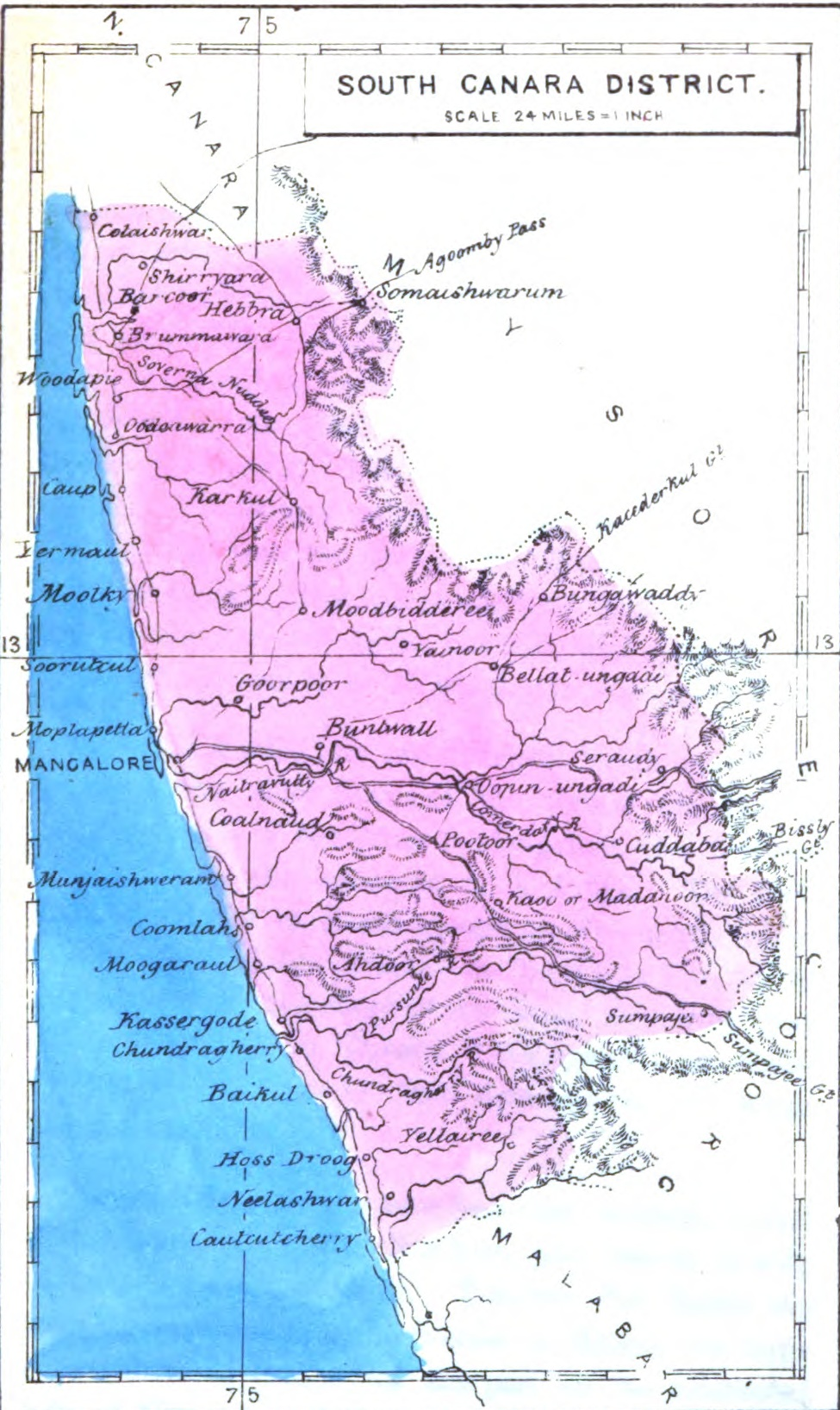
Map of South Kanara district in 1861. The taluk of Coondapoor was then in North Kanara but was transferred to South Kanara district when North Kanara was transferred to Bombay Presidency in 1862

The district was divided into six taluks:

- Amindivi Islands (Laccadives) (Area:7.8 square kilometres (3 sq mi))
- Coondapoor (Area:1,600 square kilometres (619 sq mi); Headquarters: Coondapoor)
- Kasaragod (Area:1,970 square kilometres (762 sq mi); Headquarters: Kasaragod)
- Mangalore (Area:1,760 square kilometres (679 sq mi); Headquarters: Mangalore)
- Udupi (Area:1,860 square kilometres (719 sq mi); Headquarters: Udupi)
- Uppinangady (Area:3,210 square kilometres (1,239 sq mi); Headquarters: Puttur)

== Administration ==
The district was administered by a District Collector. For purpose of convenience, the district was divided into three sub-divisions:

- Coondapoor sub-division: Coondapoor and Udupi taluks
- Mangalore sub-division: Mangalore, and the Amindivi islands
- Puttur sub-division: Uppinangady and Kasaragod taluks.

The district had two municipalities, those of Mangalore and Udupi.

== Demographics ==
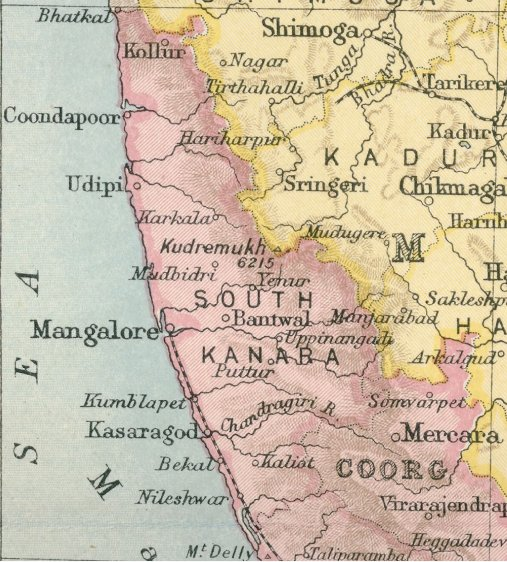
South Canara in 1909

Historical population
Year	Pop.	±%
1871	918,362	—
1881	959,514	+4.5%
1891	1,056,081	+10.1%
1901	1,134,713	+7.4%
1941	1,522,016	+34.1%
1951	1,748,991	+14.9%
Sources: Imperial Gazetter of India, Volume 14, and 1951 Census Handbook of South Canara

Religion in South Canara (1951)
1. Hinduism (66.6%)
2. Islam (24.3%)
3. Christianity (8.85%)
4. Other (0.26%)
Language in South Canara (1951)
1. Tulu (39.9%)
2. Malayalam (24.2%)
3. Kannada (17.2%)
4. Konkani (13.6%)
5. Other (5.08%)

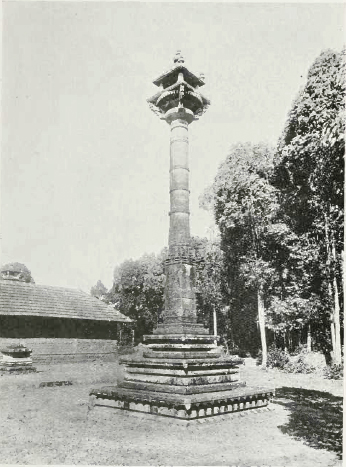
Temple stambha, South Canara

South Kanara had a total population of 1,748,991 in 1951, of whom 66.58% were Hindu, 24.31% Muslim and 8.85% Christian. The most widely spoken language was Tulu, which was the mother tongue of 40% of the population, followed by Malayalam for 24%, Kannada for 17%, and 13% for Konkani. In 1901, South Kanara had a density of 109 inhabitants per square kilometre (282/sq mi).

The 1908 Imperial Gazetteer of India lists South Canara, along with the Thanjavur and Ganjam districts, as the three districts of the Madras Presidency where Brahmins, one of the four main castes in Hinduism, were most numerous.

The majority of the people were Billavas , Kulala and Bunts. There were more Brahmins (12% of the population) in South Kanara than any other district of the Madras Presidency making South Kanara, along with Tanjore and Ganjam, as one of the three districts of the province where Brahmins were most numerous.

The original indigenous people of the region are Tuluvas (Bunts, Kulalas, Billavas, Mogaveeras, Tulu gowda, Devadigas, Bearys, Jogis) and Malayalis in the Kasaragod Taluk (Nambudiris, Nairs, Thiyyas, Mappilas etc). The Brahmins who settled first belonged chiefly to the Sthanika and thus they were called as Tulu Brahmins. Others were Shivalli, Saraswat, Havyaka, Kotaha sub-sections, Mahars, the hill-tribes (Koragas).

Native Languages of South Canara District (1951)
Language		Number of Speakers	Percent to total population
1	Tulu	698,532	39.94%
2	Malayalam	423,037	24.19%
3	Kannada	300,829	17.20%
4	Konkani	237,772	13.59%
5	Marathi	49,991	2.86%
6	Urdu	17,043	0.97%
7	Hindustani	13,672	0.78%
8	Tamil	2,933	0.17%
9	Telugu	2,382	0.14%
10	Arabic	1,063	0.06%
11	Others	1,737	0.10%

== See also ==
- Dakshina Kannada
- Kasaragod district
- Mangalore
- Udupi
- Kasargod
- Amindivi
- Puttur
