= Jai Tulunad =

Tulu organization

- Founded at: Mulki, India

Jai Tulunad is a Tulu organisation of Tulu people which works for growth of culture, language and script of Tulunad. The organisation was started in Mulki on Aug 10, 2014. It was registered on 10 Aug 2015. The organisation also teaches Tulu script for free in both mediums online and offline.

== Presidents ==
Name	Year
Jai Tulunad, founder committee	August 2014 to May 2015
Prasanth Saliyan	May 2015 to August 2016
Ashwath Tuluve	August 2016 to September 2017
Arun Tuluve	September 2017 to February 2020
Sudarshan Surathkal	February 2020 to October 2021
Jai Tulunad, founder committee	October 2021 to February 2022
Ashwath Tuluve	February 2022 to May 2023
Vishu shrikera	May 2023 to May 2024
Uday poonja	May 2024 to present

== Works ==
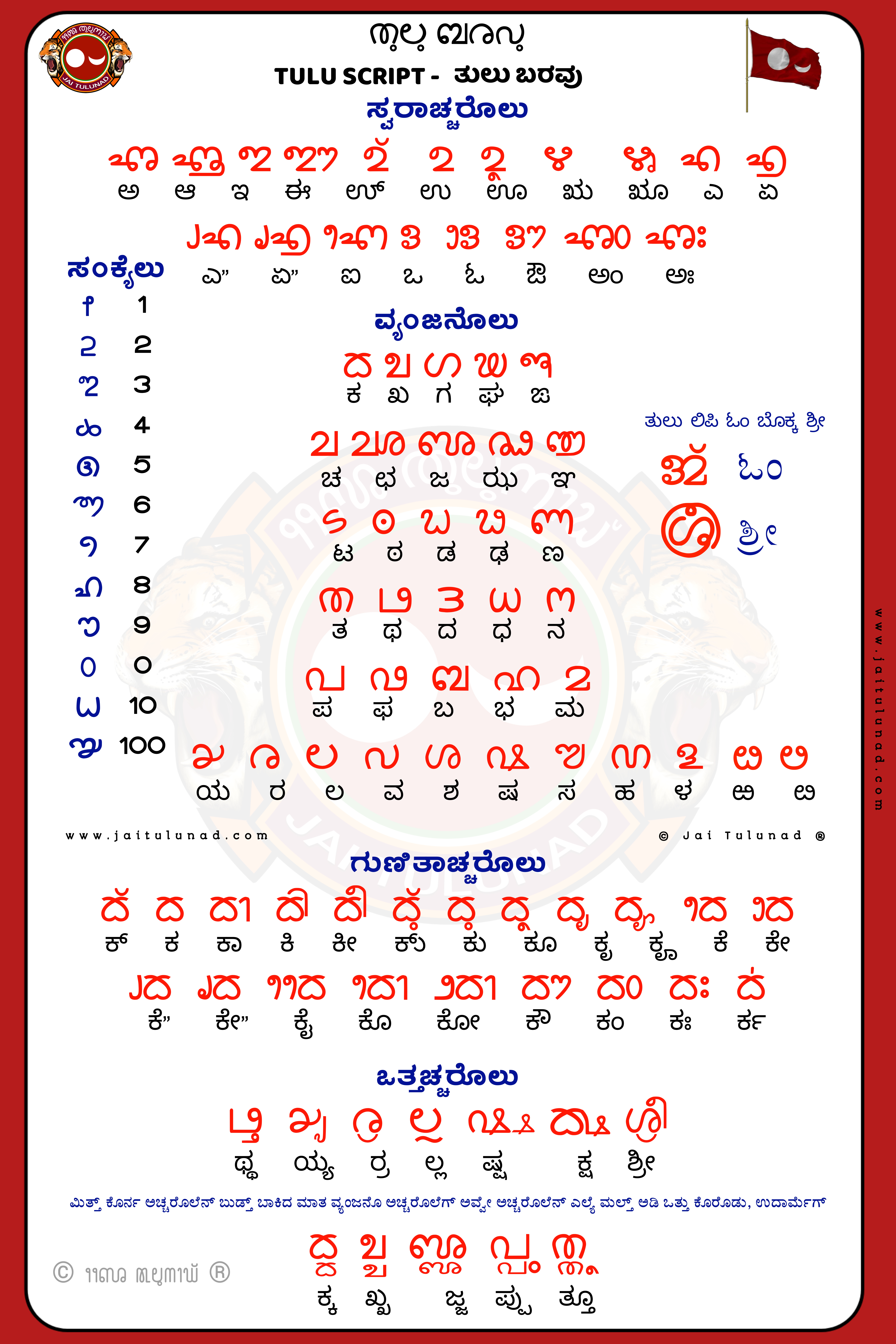
Tulu script chart

- Campaign against the Abused Worshipping of divine spiritual energy (Bootharadhane/Daivaradhane)

The organization has fought against the abused worship of the divine spiritual energy (Daivaradhane/Bootharadhane) according to the law and creates awareness among the people about the actions taken against the abuse.

- Tulu as the official language of the state

The organization has worked for many years towards recognition of the Tulu language as the state language. By creating awareness in social media, for the first time, #TuluOfficialinKA_KL twitter campaign got trended and reached up to 4 lakh tweets just in a day and got a sensational reach throughout the nation. The organization has also stressed the MLAs of Tulunad and Home Minister for the official recognition of Tulu.

- Constitutional recognition of Tulu language

Many awareness campaigns like #TuluTo8thSchedule were conducted in social medias and stressing the political leaders regarding the same were done by the organization.

- Teaching Tulu language

From past many years, Jai Tulunad has been teaching people, to speak Tulu with an intention that not only people from Tulunad, but also people from other places could learn to speak Tulu. Many people outside Tulunad are individually coming forward to learn Tulu.

- Tulu script classes

With an intention of teaching Tulu script to all Tuluvas, free online Tulu script classes were conducted during the time of covid pandemic and after the pandemic around 35 offline classes were conducted. Many requests for conducting script classes in the future days are also being received. Along with this, around 10000 people have registered online for learning Tulu script and more than 2000 people have already written script exams.

- Training Tulu script Teachers

The organisation has been teaching Tulu script from many years and from past one year, the organization has prepared more than 150 Tulu script teachers. The organization has successfully created a large number of platforms for teaching Tulu script throughout Tulunad.

- Tulu Baravu Font

The organization has developed a Tulu Font called "Tulu Baravu". It was brought up so that people could type Tulu in their mobile and computer. This Baravu Font was prepared from the model of Tulu academy's Unicode script. This has enabled people to use Tulu script in many boards, banners, social media posters, invitation cards, and many other.

- "KOPPARIGE" Online Tulu Dictionary

On 2 July 2021 the organization released "KOPPARIGE", an online Tulu dictionary, so that people could search the meaning of some words, reuse the endangered Tulu words and grab their interest towards Tulu literature. In this dictionary, users can get the meaning along with the details of any Tulu word in English, Hindi, Malayalam, Tamil, Telugu and Kannada. The specialty of this dictionary is that the words are written in Tulu script and the pronunciation of each word is available in the form of recorded audio. This dictionary is one of the biggest achievements of Jai Tulunad (R) organization.

- Tulu Mandara Font

On 9 July 2021, the organization released a Tulu Font "Mandara". It was developed by Prahlad Tantry and launched by Udupi MLA Raghupathi Bhat.

- "GenaSiri" Tulu Transcriptor

On 2 July 2022,"GenaSiri", which will allow users to transcript from Kannada and Malayalam texts to Tulu was released. This was developed by Jnanesh Derlakatte and released through the organization.

== See also ==
- Tulu language
- Tulu Nadu
- Tulu Nadu state movement
