= Tulu Nadu =

Region and proposed state in southern India

- Region
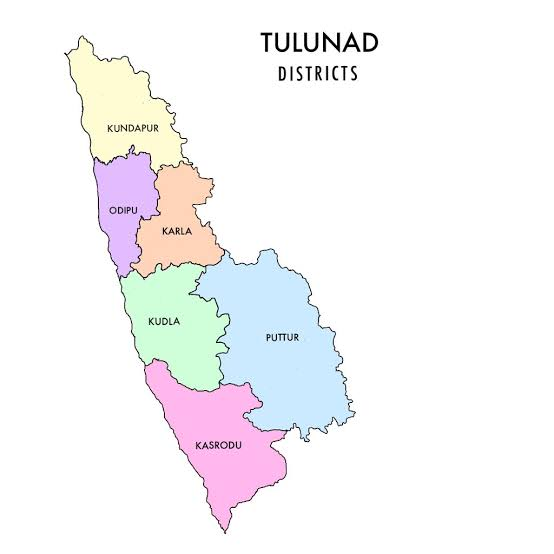
- South Canara, an erstwhile district, forms the centre of the Tuluva region called 'Tulu Nadu'.
- Coordinates: 13.00°N 75.40°E
- Country: India
- State: Karnataka, Kerala
- Districts: Dakshina Kannada, Udupi and Kasaragod
- Largest City: Mangalore
- No. of districts & Talukas: 3 Districts and 18 Taluks

Area
  - Total: 10,432 km^{2} (4,028 sq mi)

Population (2011)
  - Total: 4,574,385
  - Density: 438.50/km^{2} (1,135.7/sq mi)
- Demonyms: Tuluve (masculine); Tuluvedi (feminine)

Languages
  - Lingua Franca: Tulu
  - Spoken: Tulu, Konkani, Beary, Kannada, Malayalam
- Time zone: UTC+5:30 (IST)
- Telephone code: 0824, 0825
- ISO 3166 code: ISO 3166-2:IN
- Vehicle registration: KA19, KA20, KA21, KA62, KA70, KL14.

- Person: Tuḷuve
- People: Tuḷuverŭ
- Language: Tuḷu
- Country: Tuḷu Nāḍŭ

Tulu Nadu, or Tulunad, is a region and a proposed state on the southwestern coast of India. The region is predominantly inhabited by the Tulu people, also known as Tuluva, who speak Tulu, a Dravidian language. The former district encompassed the territories of the contemporary Dakshina Kannada (Kudla) and Udupi (Odipu) of Karnataka State, and Kasaragod district (Kasrod) of Kerala state. These areas collectively form the cultural region of the Tuluver.

Historically, Tulu Nadu lies between the Gangavalli River (Uttara Kannada district of Karnataka) and Nileshwar (Kasaragod district of Kerala). Despite its distinct cultural identity, the region is not recognized as an official administrative entity.

Kudla (Mangaluru) is the largest city in Tulu Nadu, the third-largest city by area, and the fifth-largest by population in Karnataka. Udupi (Odipu) and Kasarogod (Kasrod) are two other major cities in this region, both located on the Kerala-Karnataka border.

The term "Tulunadu" appears as "Tuḷu Nāṭṭu" in Akananuru, a classical Tamil poetic work that is part of the "Eight Anthologies" (Ettuthokai) — a collection of Sangam literature composed over 2000 years ago.

== Etymology ==
According to Keralolpathi, the name Tuluva comes from the name of one of the Cheraman Perumal kings of Kerala, who located their residence in the northern portion of their dominions just before its separation from Kerala, and was called Tulubhan Perumal.

== Foundation narrative ==
According to its foundation narrative, the district was reclaimed by Parashurama from the sea. According to the 17th-century Malayalam work Keralolpathi, the lands of Kerala and Tulu Nadu were recovered from the Arabian Sea by the ax-wielding warrior sage Lord Parashurama, the sixth avatar of Lord Vishnu (hence, Kerala is also called Parasurama Kshetram, 'The Land of Parasurama'). Parasurama threw his ax across the sea, and the water receded as far as it reached. According to legend, this new area of land extended from Gokarna to Kanyakumari. The land which rose from sea was filled with salt and unsuitable for habitation; so Parashurama invoked the Snake King Nagaraja Vasuki, who spat holy poison known as Halahala and converted the soil into fertile lush green land. Out of respect, Vasuki and all snakes were appointed as protectors and guardians of the land. P. T. Srinivasa Iyengar theorised that Cheran Senguttuvan may have been inspired by the Parashurama legend, which was brought by early Aryan settlers.

== History ==
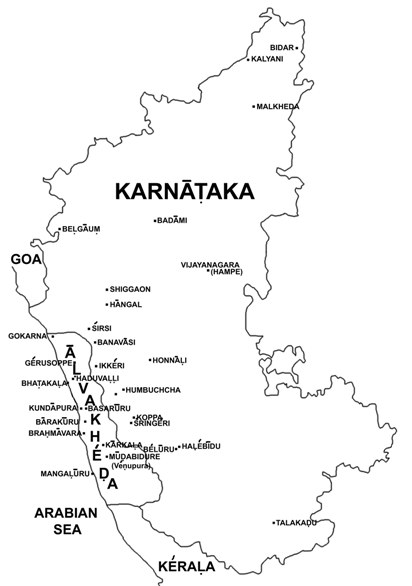
Extent of the Alupa kingdom

A regional map of Tulu Nadu in Karnataka. Tulu Nadu also includes Kasaragod district of Kerala state.

=== Ancient period ===
According to the works of Sangam literature (300 BCE – 300 CE), Tulu Nadu was one of the 12 socio-geographical regions included in the ancient Tamilakam. Tulu Nadu likely formed part of ancient Kerala (Chera dynasty), where the western coastal dialect of Middle Tamil was spoken. It must have separated from Tamilakam sometime between 300 CE and 500 CE, when the Kadambas invaded the northern portions of Chera kingdom. No definite historical records relating to Tulu Nadu, other than those found in Sangam literature, have been discovered of an earlier date than 8th or 9th century CE.

=== Alupa dynasty ===
Ptolemy, a Greco-Roman 2nd-century geographer, identifies the Tulu Nadu region as Olokhoira which is widely believed to be a corruption of the term Alva Kheda, "the land of the Alvas". Historically, Tulu Nadu included the two separate lands of Haiva and Tuluva. The longest-ruling and oldest known native dynasty of Tulu Nadu was that of the Alupas (c. 5th – 14th century CE). Their kingdom was also known as Alvakheda. They initially ruled independently and later were the feudatories of the prominent dynasties. The Kadamba dynasty of Banavasi was the earliest, under which the Alupas flourished. Later, the Rashtrakutas of Manyakheta, Chalukyas of Badami, Chalukyas of Kalyani, Hoysalas of Dwarasamudra (Halebidu), and Rayas of Vijayanagara were the overlords. The Alupas, however, were independent, and their subordination was nominal at best. They ruled until the Vijayanagara Empire took control of Tulu Nadu from 14th to the 17th centuries.

During the rule of Vijayanagara, Tulu Nadu was administered in two parts – Mangaluru Rajya and Barkuru Rajya. Tulu Nadu was governed by the native feudatories of the Vijayanagara Empire until the 18th century. These feudatories gained power towards the end of the Alupa period. An Old Malayalam inscription (Ramanthali inscriptions), dated to 1075, mentioning king Kunda Alupa, the ruler of Alupa dynasty of Mangalore, can be found at Ezhimala (the former headquarters of Mushika dynasty), near Payyanur, in Kerala State.

Notable among them were the Chowtas of Ullal and Moodabidri (c. 1160 – c. 1801 CE), Ajilas of Venur (c. 1418–1800 CE), the Savanta or Samantha Rajas of Mulki (c. 1411–1700 CE), the Bhairahawa Ideas of Karkala (c. 1240–1650 CE), the Tolaharas of Suralu (c. 1139–1800 CE), the Bangas of Bangadi (c.1410–1800 CE), the Rajas of Kumbla (c. 12th century – 1800 CE), and the Rajas of Vitla (c. 1436–1800 CE).

The region became extremely prosperous during the Vijayanagara period, with Barkur and Mangalore gaining importance. After the decline of the Vijayanagara Empire, the Keladi Nayakas of Ikkeri controlled much of Tulu Nadu. Over the following centuries, more ethnic groups migrated to the area. Konkanis from Goa arrived by sea, as Mangaluru was a major port that served not only the Portuguese but also the Arabs for maritime trades. Jains were already a prominent group and even today are uniquely preserved in Tulu Nadu. Though small in number, the Jains left behind indelible reminders of their glory with temples (bastis), (mandirs) in (Moodabidri) and monolithic statues of the Jain god Bahubali in Karkala, Venoor and Dharmasthala. In the 16th century, there was a large influx of Catholics to Tulu Nadu from Goa.

Under Portuguese rule, the region was called the Misao do Sul (Mission of the South). In the mid- to late-18th century, it was conquered by Hyder Ali, the de facto ruler of Mysore. After the British defeated Haidar's successor Tipu Sultan in 1799, the region was attached to the Madras Presidency before being reverted to the state of Mysore after independence. Mangalore played a prominent role in Tipu's battles with the British. The British gained full control by 1801 (Mysore has since been renamed Karnataka). The British ruled the region with Madras (now Chennai) as its headquarters. Under the British, the region was organized into the districts of North Canara and South Canara respectively.

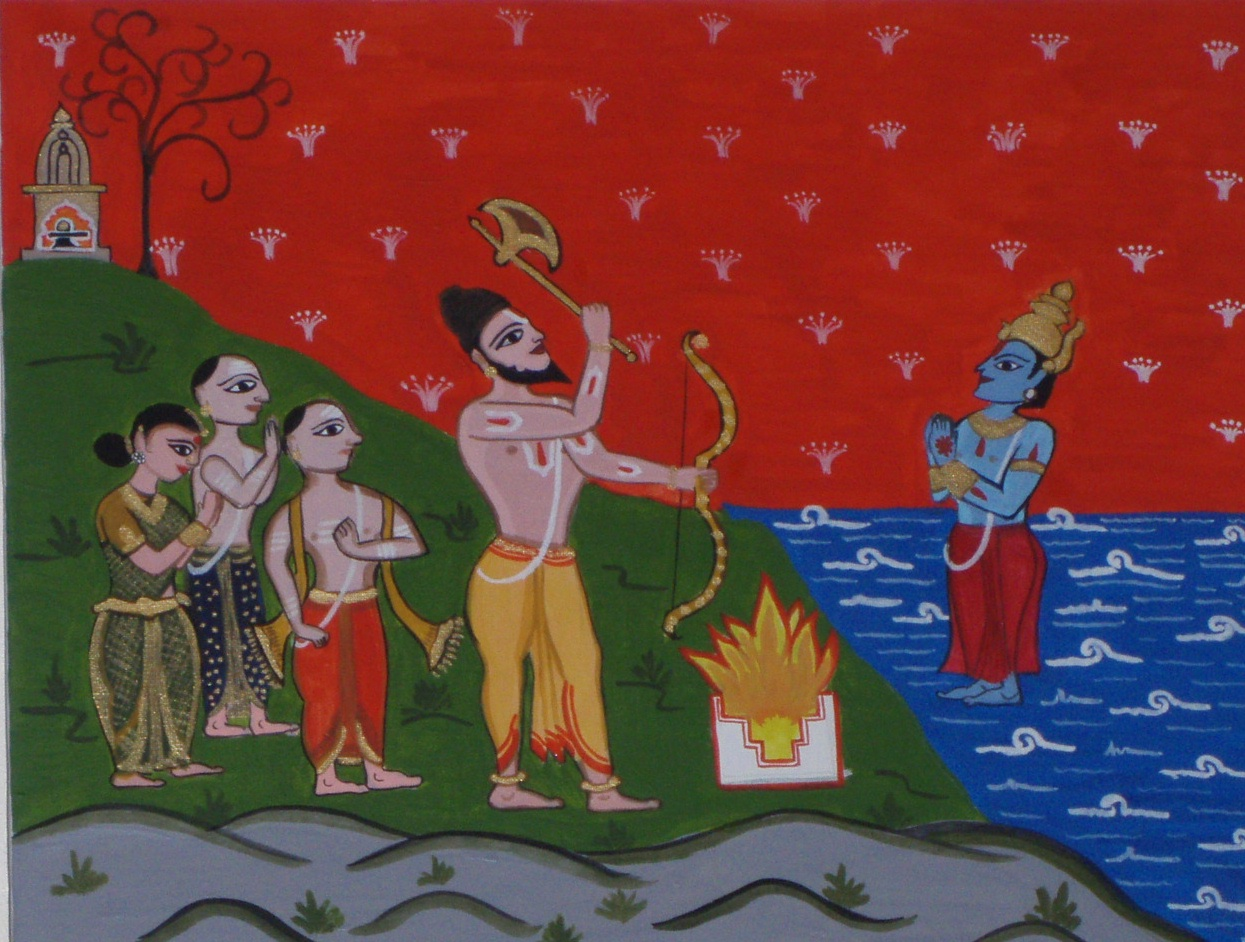
As per Hindu mythology, Parashurama commanded Lord Varuna to make the seas recede to make the Tulu Nadu.

When the states were reorganized on a linguistic basis in 1956, Tulu Nadu (South Canara), which was earlier a part of Madras Presidency, and North Canara, which was a part of Bombay Presidency, became part of the newly formed Mysore state, which was later renamed as Karnataka. Kasaragod became part of the newly formed state of Kerala. The Tuluvas began demanding official language status for Tulu and a separate state named Tulu Nadu for themselves. Organizations like the Tulu Rajya Horata Samiti have taken up the cause of the Tuluvas, and meetings and demonstrations were held at towns like Mangalore and Udupi to voice their demand.

== Demographics ==
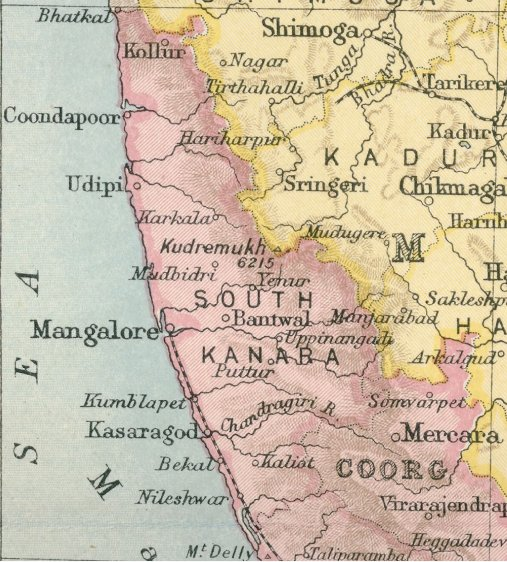
South Canara in 1909

Historical population
Year	Pop.	±%
1871	918,362	—
1881	959,514	+4.5%
1891	1,056,081	+10.1%
1901	1,134,713	+7.4%
1941	1,522,016	+34.1%
1951	1,748,991	+14.9%
Sources: Imperial Gazetteer of India, Volume 14, and 1951 Census Handbook of South Canara

Religion in South Canara (1951)
1. Hinduism (76.6%)
2. Islam (14.3%)
3. Christianity (8.85%)
4. Other (0.26%)
Language in South Canara (1951)
1. Tulu (39.9%)
2. Malayalam (24.2%)
3. Kannada (17.2%)
4. Konkani (13.6%)
5. Other (5.08%)

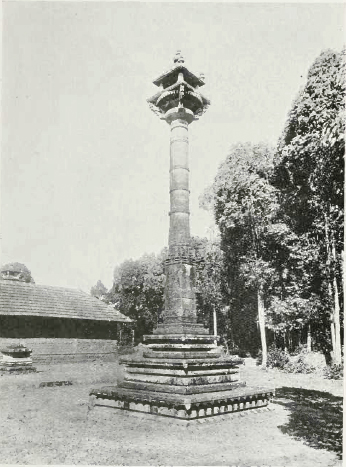
Temple stambha, South Canara.

South Canara had a total population of 1,748,991 in 1951, of whom 76.58% were Hindus, 14.31% Muslim, and 8.85% Christian. The most widely spoken language was Tulu which was the mother tongue of 40% of the population, followed by Malayalam which formed the mother tongue of 24% each of the population. Around 17% of the total population spoke Kannada. Around 13% of the population spoke Konkani as their mother tongue. In 1901, it had a density of 109 inhabitants per square kilometre (282/sq mi).

The 1908 Imperial Gazetteer of India lists South Canara, along with the Thanjavur and Ganjam districts, as the three districts of the Madras Presidency where Brahmins are most numerous.

The majority of the people were Billavas and Bunts. There were more Brahmins (12% of the population) in South Kanara than in any other district of the Madras Presidency, making South Kanara, along with Tanjore and Ganjam one of the three districts of the province where Brahmins were most numerous.

The original indigenous people of the region are Tuluvas (Bunts, Billavas, Mogaveeras, Tulu Gowdas, Kulalas, Devadigas, Bearys, Jogis, and Tuluva Brahmins) and Malayalis in the Kasaragod Taluk (Nambudiris, Nairs, Thiyyas, Mappilas etc.). The Brahmins who settled first belonged chiefly to the Sthanika and thus they were called Tulu Brahmins. Others wereHavyaka, Shivalli, Saraswat, Kota sub-sections, Mahars, the hill-tribes (Koragas).

== Language ==
Tulu script has been used for Tulu since at least the 10th century.

The most widely spoken language is Tulu, which belongs to the Dravidian family of languages, and whose native speakers are referred to as Tuluva. The number of Tulu speakers was estimated to be about 1.7 million in 2001, although some sources quote as many as 3 million. The other languages spoken in Tulu Nadu include Havyaka,Kundagannada, Arebhashe, Malayalam, Konkani, Koraga, and Beary.

The Tulu script (also known as the Tulu–Tigalari script) originates from the Grantha script and bears strong similarity to the Malayalam script. It was used in Tulu Nadu for many centuries before later being replaced by the Kannada script for most writing. A large corpus of Sanskrit manuscripts—including Vedic and religious works—was historically written in this script, and several important Tulu classical works, such as the Tulu Mahabharata, Kaveri, Bhagavato, and Devimahatme, also survive in this script.

== Geography and climate ==
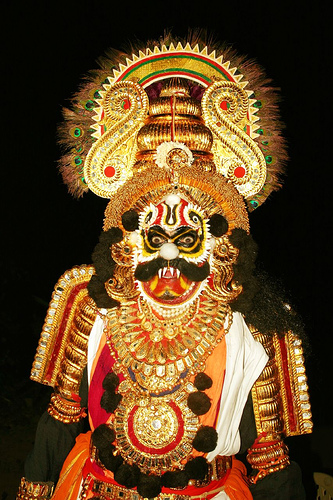
A Yakshagana artist portraying a rakshasa (demon).

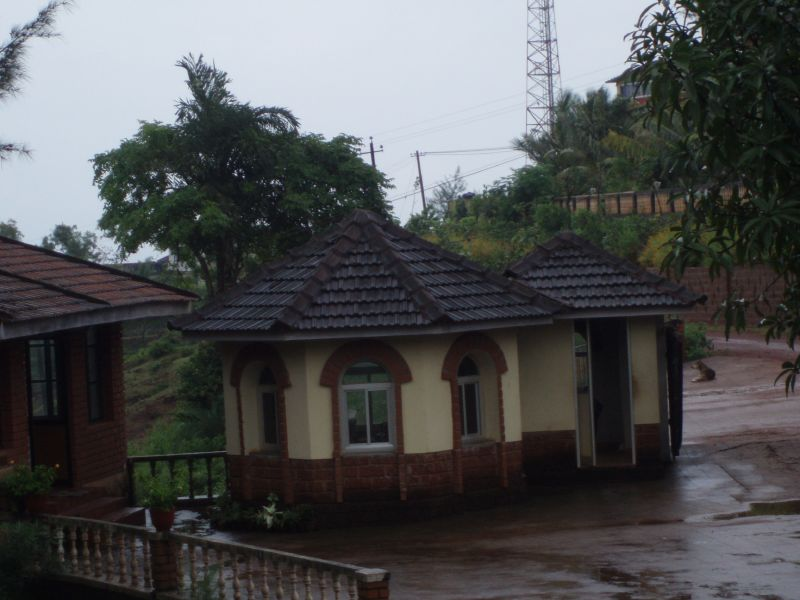
A typical house in Tulu Nadu, with the roof constructed using Mangalore tiles

Tulu Nadu lies along the Konkan Coast. Tulu Nadu is bounded on the west by the Arabian Sea and on the east by the Western Ghats. The Chandragiri river forms a historical border to the south. Tulu Nadu spans an area of 8,441 km^{2} (3,259 sq mi), roughly 4.4 percent of the total geographical area of present-day Karnataka and Kasaragod district is the northernmost district of Kerala.

The coastal region of Tulu Nadu is characterized by its lush rainforests and serene backwaters. The area enjoys a tropical climate, marked by scorching summers, humid days, and a monsoon season that brings heavy rainfall. While summer and winter months experience similar temperature conditions, with average temperatures ranging from 24 to 33 degrees Celsius (75 to 91 degrees Fahrenheit), the monsoon season brings a refreshing respite from the heat.

Monsoon starts at the beginning of June, with the heaviest rainfall during Aati month, which spans from mid-July to mid-August. Occasional rain persists until Deepawali and Marnemi festivals in October–November. Winter lasts from December to early February, and Summer from mid-February until May. With occasional tropical rain during April and May.

== Culture ==
Cultural flag of Tulunadu region in India

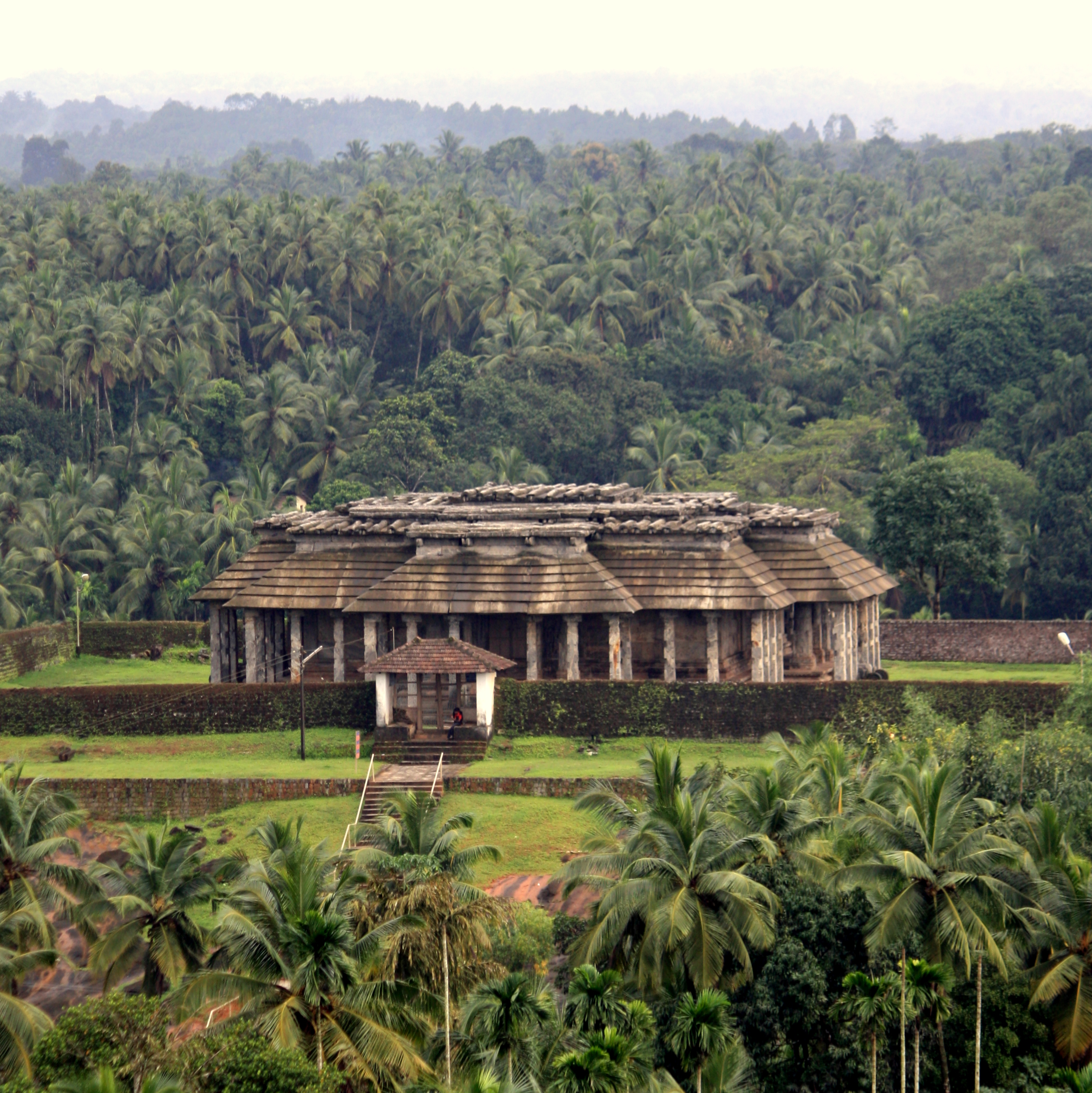
Chaturmukha Basadi, Karkala

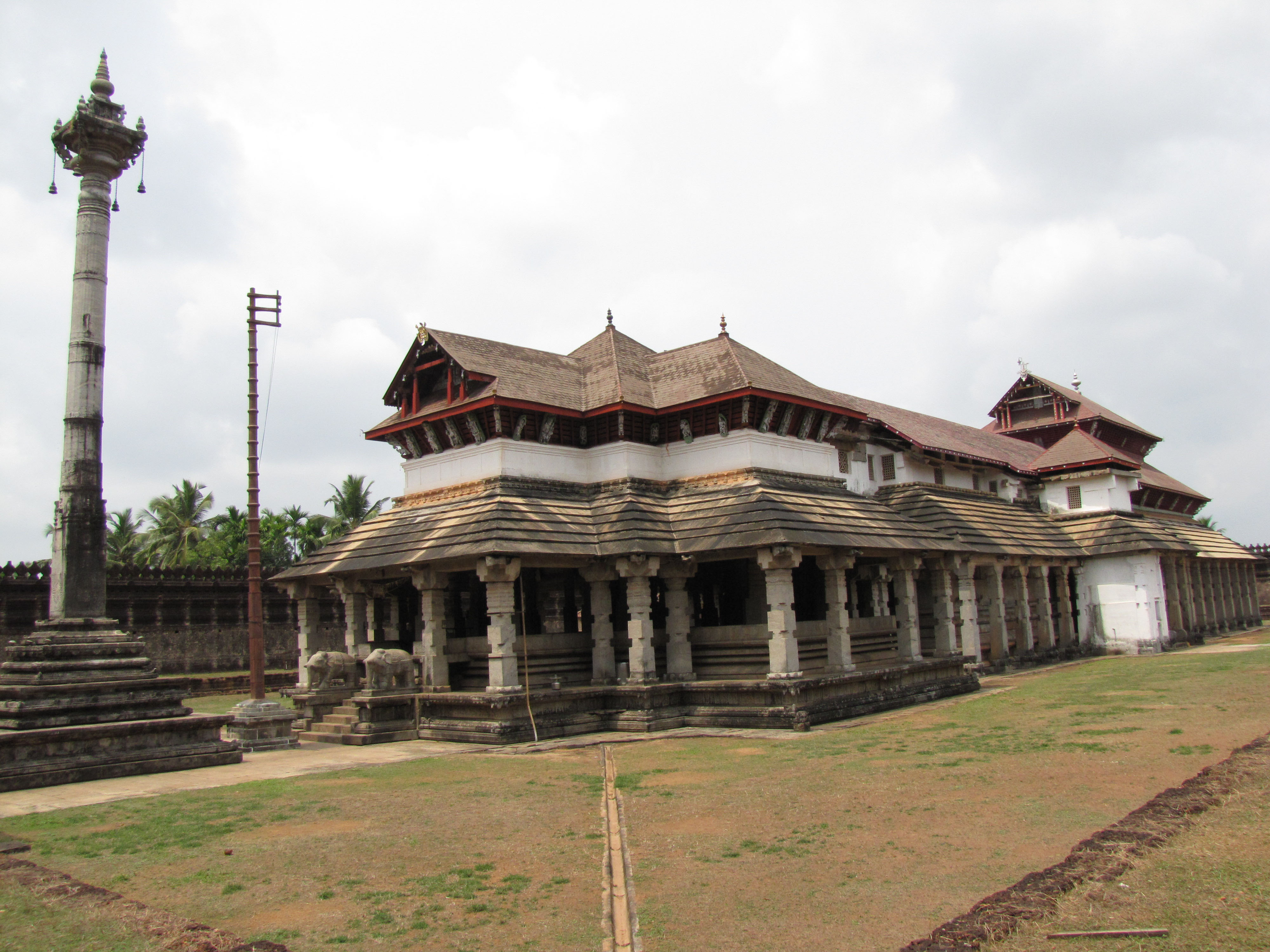
Saavira Kambada Basadi, Moodabidri

Most communities of Tulu Nadu live by Aliyasantana (matrilineal) culture as opposed to Magana Santhana (patrilineal) culture. In the matrilineal system of inheritance the lineage/inheritance is passed through the female line. Traditionally, the inheritance of the male members of the family went to the children of their sisters. Even today, many families in Mangalore practice kavar paalu while dividing old properties. Kavar paal is a system where children of the male members of the family do not inherit any of their paternal ancestral property.

Yakshagana is a night-long dance and drama performance practiced in Tulu Nadu with great fanfare. Pilivesha is a unique form of folk dance in the region fascinating the young and the old alike, which is performed during Marnemi (or Dussehra in Tulu) and Krishna Janmashtami. Karadi Vesha (Bear Dance) is another popular dance performed during Dasara in Tulu Nadu. Daivaradhane (spirit worship), which is usually done at night, is practised here. Kambala (Buffalo race) is conducted in water-filled paddy fields. The Bhuta Kola is similar to Theyyam in North Malabar. Korikatta (cockfighting) is another favorite sport of the people. Nagaradhane (snake worship) is practiced in the Tulu Nadu according to the popular belief of the Naga Devatha who resides underground and guards the species on the surface.

Koppala kattu, a Tulu ritual tradition

Kanya Booru, a Tulu ritual tradition

Udupi cuisine is popular across South India, mostly due to Udupi restaurants, which are primarily vegetarian. Outside Southern India, there are also famous Udupi Hotels in Mumbai and New Delhi.

== Economy ==
Historically, Tulu Nadu was primarily dependent on agriculture and fishing. The main crops grown were rice, Bengal gram, horse gram, vegetables, and fruits. Plantation crops like coconut, areca nut, cocoa, cashew nut, and pepper are also grown. In the early 20th century, the Mangalore tile industry, cashew nut processing, and the banking industry grew substantially. Tulu Nadu is called "The cradle of Indian banking". Five major banks of India (Syndicate Bank, Canara Bank, Corporation Bank, Vijaya Bank, and Karnataka Bank) have their origins here.

List of Banks of Tulu Nadu:

Bank	Founded	Place	Founded by	Ref.
Canara Bank	1906; 120 years ago	Mangalore	Ammembal Subba Rao Pai	
Karnataka Bank	1924; 102 years ago	Mangalore	-	
Vijaya Bank	1931; 95 years ago	Mangalore	A. B. Shetty	
Syndicate Bank	1925; 101 years ago	Manipal	T. M. A. Pai, Upendra Pai, and Vaman Kudva	
Corporation Bank	1906; 120 years ago	Udupi	Khan Bahadur Haji Abdulla Haji Kasim Saheb Bahadur	

Activities of Tulu language, Tulu Wiki medians

In the early part of the 21st century, the area has been transforming itself into a hub of the information technology and medical services industries. There has been a large-scale decline in agriculture and related industries due to the non-availability of labor and preference for white-collar jobs. Agricultural land is being converted to commercial and real estate properties, and environmental pollution is increasing drastically due to large-scale deforestation and an increase in automobile use. A public sector petroleum refinery (MRPL) was established in the 1990s. Some chemical plants (e.g., fertilizers and pesticides) have been established. This region contributes the second-highest revenue to Karnataka after its capital city Bengaluru. This region has an international airport at Mangalore, which is well connected to the rest of India and Middle Eastern countries. New Mangalore Port (NMPT) is one of the major ports of India located at Panambur, Mangalore.

== Education ==
Tulu Nadu contains several large educational institutions. Mangalore and Manipal host multiple universities and colleges. The National Institute of Technology Karnataka (NITK), located in Surathkal, is a centrally funded technical institute among India’s top engineering colleges according to national surveys such as the NIRF. Kasturba Medical College (KMC), with campuses in both Manipal and Mangalore, was ranked 9th and 21st respectively in the National Institutional Ranking Framework (NIRF) 2020 rankings.

=== Colleges ===
- St Aloysius College
- St Agnes College
- National Institute of Technology, Karnataka
- MIT Manipal
- Mangalore University
- Kasturba Medical College
- Canara College
- NITTE

== See also ==
- Tulu Nadu state movement
- List of temples in Tulu Nadu
- Kolathunadu
- Communities of Tulu Nadu
