= Tuluva Brahmin =

Inhabitants of Tulu Nadu, India

Tulu Brahmins or Tuluva Brahmins are the inhabitants of Tulu Nadu, also considered a part of Parashurama Kshetra which extends to Kerala.

They consist of following:

- Kota Brahmins
- Koteshwara Brahmins
- Shivalli Brahmins
- Sthanika Brahmins
