= Nagaradhane =

Form of cobra worship in Karnataka and Kerala, India

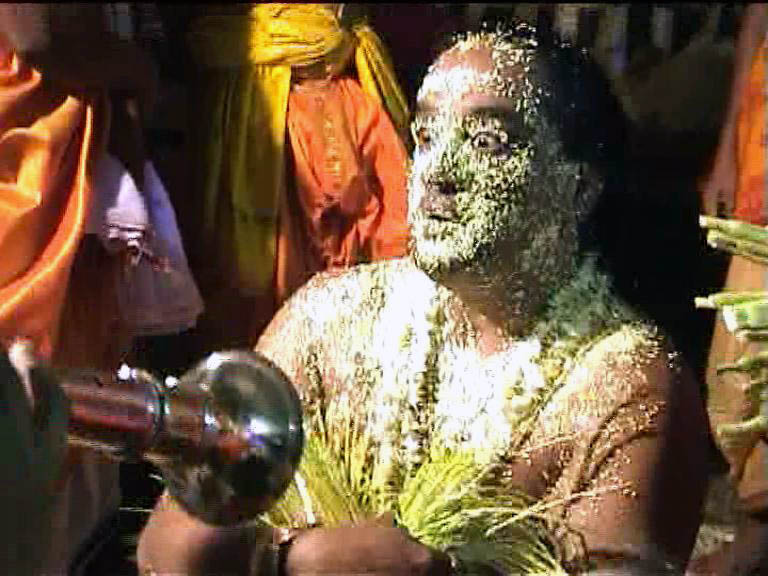
Nagapatri at belle brahmastana

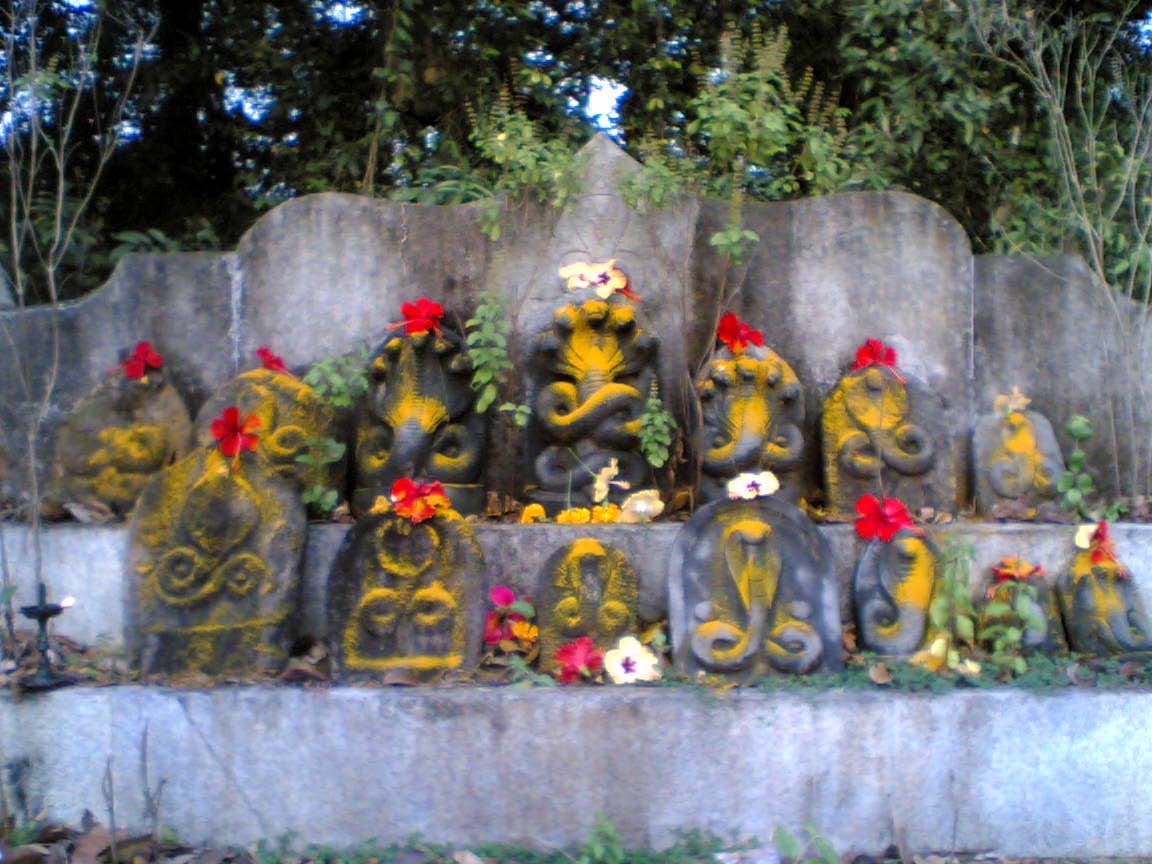
Nagabana at Belle Badagumane, Moodubelle, Udupi

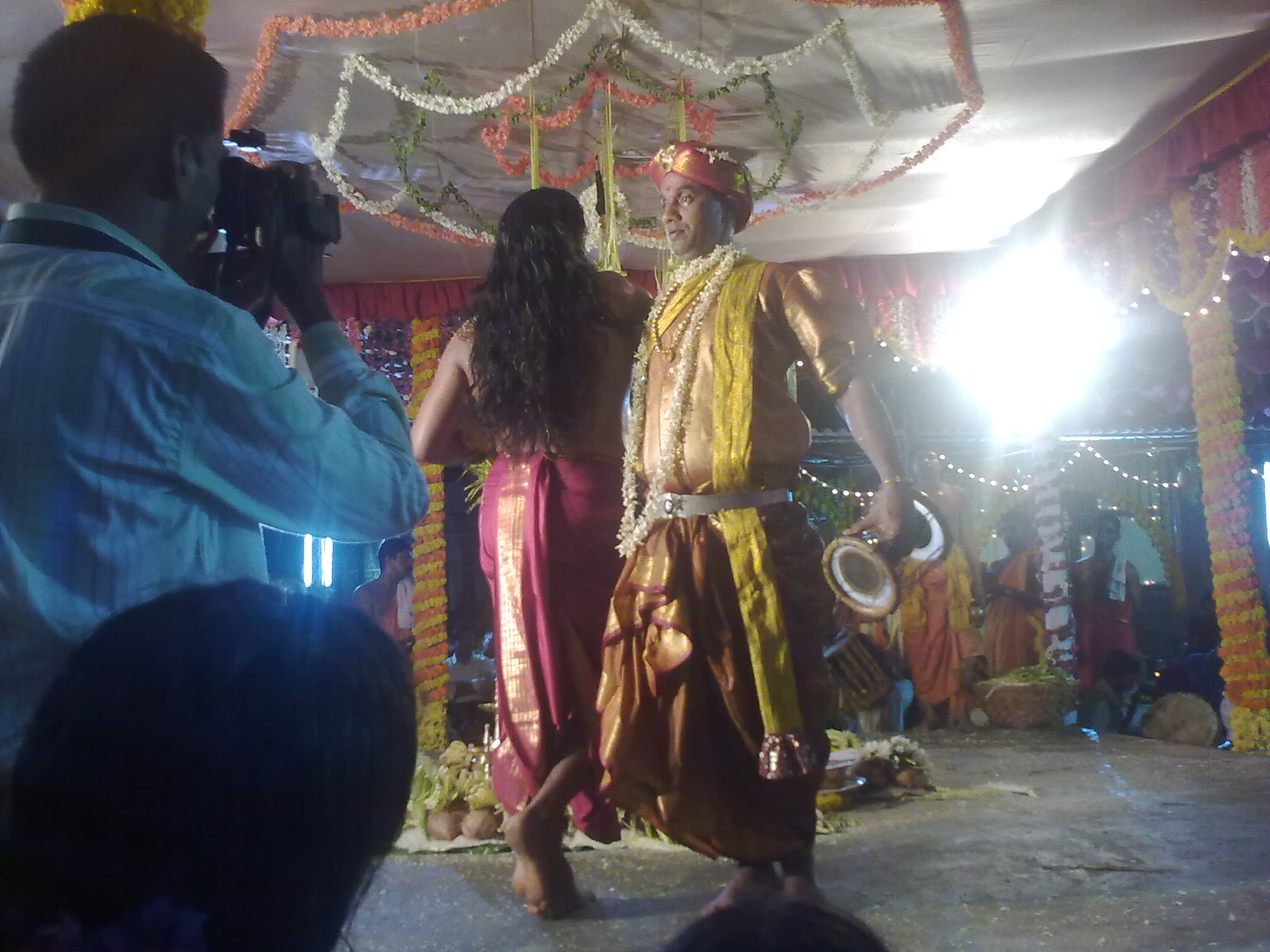
Union of nagabrahma and nagakannike at a mandala held in Belle Brahmastana, Udupi

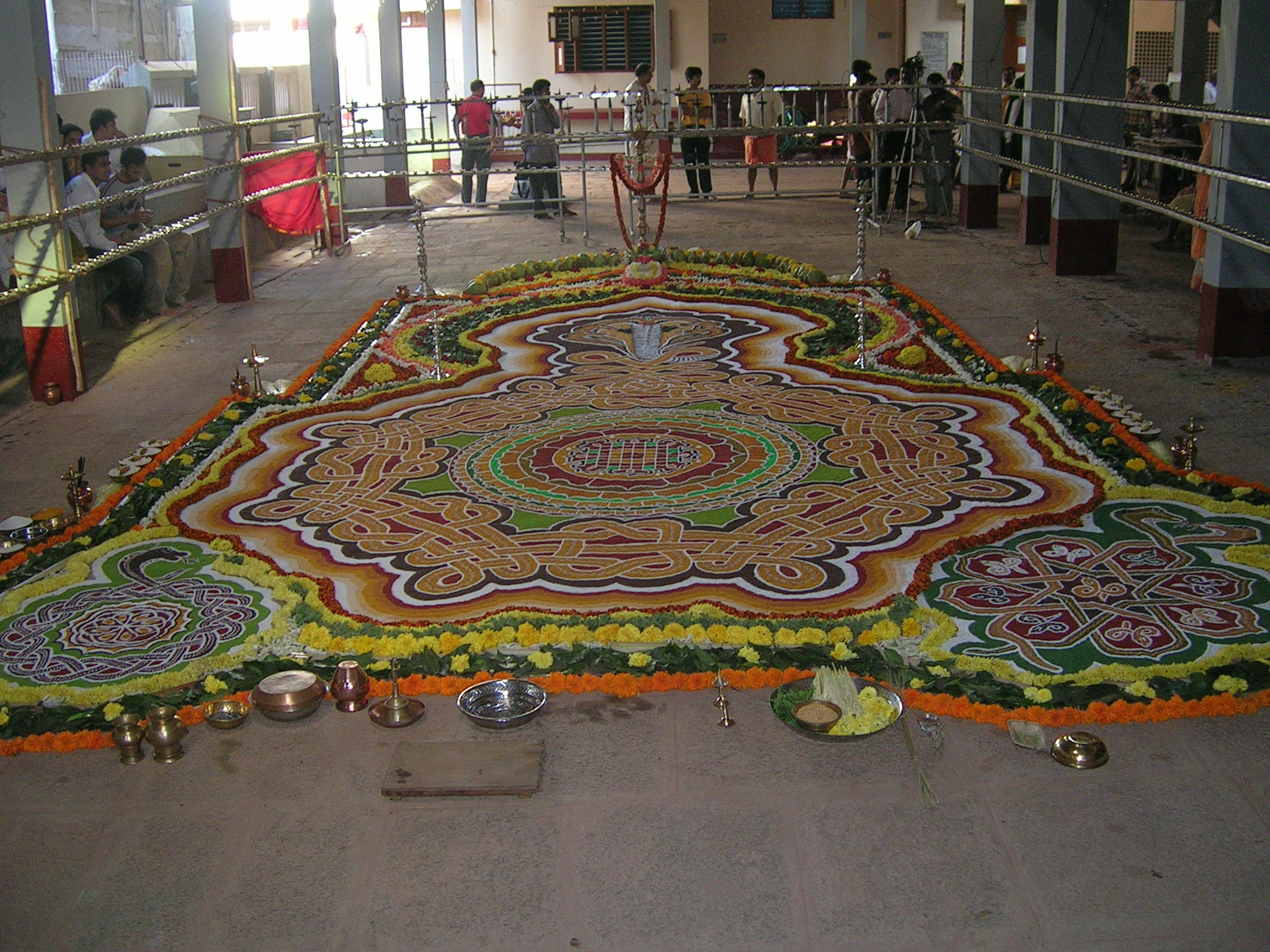
A Mandala drawn during nagamandala

Nagaradhane is a form of serpent worship which, along with Bhuta Kola, is one of the unique traditions prevalent in coastal districts of Dakshina Kannada, Udupi and Kasaragod collectively known as Tulu Nadu, practiced by Tuluva community members. Cobras are not just seen as deities, but as an animal species which should be respected, appeased and protected for multiple social, religious and ecological reasons.

== Origin of Nagaradhane ==
Cobras have been associated with power, awe and respect in India. According to Hindu culture, Lord Vishnu takes rest under the shade of the giant snake, Adishesha. Lord Shiva wears a cobra Vasuki around his neck.

It is difficult to trace the origin of Nagaradhane, though some clans among Tulu people of Nagavanshi descent, thus maybe snake worship was popularised by them. Though most rituals of snake worship are done by Brahmins, there is not a single Tuluva family that does not have Nagabana, Where Nagadevatha is worshipped according to Aliyasantana Lineage among Tuluvas. Nagamandala, Ashlesha Bali, Dakke Bali are different types of pooja done for snakes to appease them. All Tuluvas families: Bunts, Kulala, Moolya, Mogaveera, Billava, Malayali Billava, Tuluva Brahmins, Sapaliga/Sapalya, Madivala, Devadiga, Ganiga, Aachari, Parava / Nalkedaye, Koraga-Harijan, Tulu and Arebhashe Gowdas do worship Naga from ancient times in their respective Nagabana and Moolastanas.

The Cobra worship rituals practised in Tulu Nadu are quite unique and different from the other rituals. Cobras have their own snake shrines in a sacred grove known as Nagabana. The shrines have images of cobras carved on stones. Accordingly, nobody is allowed to chop the tree near the Nagabana. It is also believed that snakes, specifically the cobras, are not to be harmed or killed by anyone. If harmed, the individual has to perform a ritual to cleanse the sin of killing or harming the snake. The belief is that the individual who refuses to perform the ritual will be cursed by the Cobra for eternity.

Concept of Moolastana among communities have been majorly focussed on worshipping Naga related to their Aliyasantana Lineage based families. These Moolastanas are located consecutively on the sea front and also they had the tradition of organizing themselves into Grama Sabhas etc. on the basis of Bali/Bari which is Tuluva community equivalent of Gotra System. There are Bari in this community, each bari has a dedicated Moolastanas and few Bari has multiple Moolastanas across the Tulunadu. Each Moolastanas has annual celebrations and also Poojas during the Nagarapanchami when each house belongs to that particular Bali has to perform Pooja and Prayer of their Moola (origin) Nagadevatha which their ancestors were related to.

It can also be noted that in Tulu Nadu or the South Canara region in Karnataka, agriculture is predominant that to paddy is the main crop. In these fields snakes help in saving the crop from rodents. This can be a plausible reason for the worship of snakes.

== The ritual ==
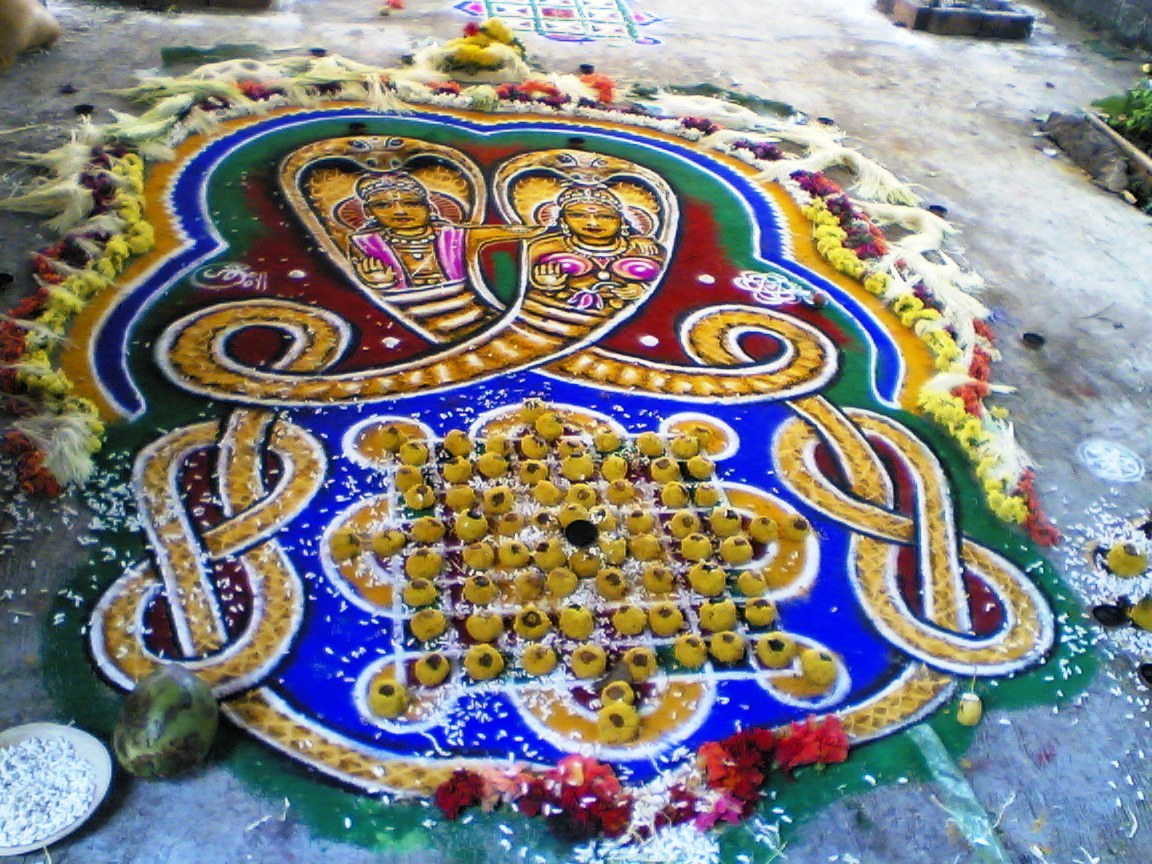
Mandala drawn during ashleshabali at Belle Badagumane Moodubelle, Udupi

There are two distinct rituals performed in reverence to the snake; Aashleshabali and Nagamandala. Of these, Nagamandala is the longer and more colourful of the two. Nagamandala depicts the divine union of male and female snakes. It is generally performed by two priests. The first priest, called patri, inhales the areca flower and becomes the male snake. The second priest, called Nagakannika or the female snake dances and swings around an elaborate serpent design drawn with natural colours on the sacred ground. The ritual is supplemented by playing an hour glass shaped instrument called as Dakke. The drawings in five different colours on the sacred ground are white (white mud), red (mix of lime powder and turmeric powder), green (green leaves powder), yellow (turmeric powder) and black (roasted and powdered paddy husk).

Aashleshabali is the ritual performed on the day of Ashlesha Nakshatra (One of the 27 star as per vedic astrology). This is a unique ritual offering food to Sarpa devatas (Serpent Deities) and one of the Vedic solutions. It is a combination of Puja, Homa and Bali (food offering). Sarpa Devatas are invoked, worshipped and Bali is offered to each one of them. Sarpa Sooktha Japam is done. This is one of the ritual to appease the sarpa devatas and getting their blessings.

The ritual, centered on the serpent design, continues until early in the morning. A similar ritual is found in Kerala and is known as Sarpam Thullal and Sarpam Kali. All communities of Tulu Nadu revere snakes.

== Significance of Nagabanas ==
Nagabanas or the sacred groves are deemed to be the resting place of snakes. Cutting of trees or defacing the grove is considered as sacrilege. People are wary of the snake-bites and also wanted ecological preservation.

== See also ==
- Billava
- Naga
- Yakshagana
- Theyyam
