= Aliyasantana =

Inheritance system followed in Tulu Nadu

Aliyasantana, literally "nephew or niece as heir" in Tulu, is the matrilineal system of inheritance practiced by Tuluva community in the Tulunaad region of Karnataka, India. It is similar to the Marumakkathayam system of Kerala. Nephew here means son of only one's sister (brother's son is not considered as the heir).

== Origins ==
=== Myth of origin ===
According to the Keralolpathi, a text by the Nambuthiri Brahmin community, Kerala Perumal, a Kshatriya prince from medieval Kerala, migrated to the Tulu region via boat. He settled there, married a Jain princess, and introduced the Aliya Santana to them. This narrative highlights the historical connections and cultural exchanges between Kerala and the Tulu region during that period.

Another popular belief in Tulunadu is that it had its source in the law promulgated by Bhūtāla-Pāndya, the sovereign prince who ruled this country at one time and that it was introduced by him. The popular version of it is contained in the Memorandum submitted to the Malabar Marriage Commission by one of its members, Mundappa Bangēra. "The Bhūtāla-Pandya's Aliya-santāna Law” shows that it was introduced by a despotic prince called Bhūtāla-Pāndya about the year 77 A.D., superseding the makkala-santana or inheritance from father to son which then prevailed (in what is now South Kanara). It is said that when the maternal uncle of Dēva-Pāņdya wanted to launch his newly constructed ships with valuable cargo in them, Kundōdara, king of demons, demanded a human sacrifice. Déva-Pāņdya asked his wife's permission to offer one of his sons but she refused, while his sister, Satyāvati, offered her son Jaya-Pandya, for the purpose. Kundōdara, discovering in the child signs of future greatness, waived the sacrifice and permitted the ships to sail. He then took the child, restored to him his father's kingdom of Jayantikā, and gave him the name Bhūtāļa-Pāņdya.

Subsequently, when some of the ships returned with immense wealth, the demon again appeared and demanded of Dēva-Pāņdya another human sacrifice. He again consulted his wife, she refused to comply with the request and publicly renounced her title and that of her children to the valuable property brought in the ships. Kundādara then demanded Deva-Pāņdya disinherit his sons of the wealth which had been brought in those ships, as also of the kingdom and to bestow all on his sister's son, Jaya-Pāņdya or Bhūtāla-Pāņdya. This was accordingly done. And as this prince inherited his kingdom from his maternal uncle and not from his father, he ruled that his own examples must be followed by his subjects and it was. Thus the aliya-santāna system was established on the 3rd Māgha śudha of the year 1 of the era of Sālivāhana called Išvara about A.D.77. Bhūtāļa-Pandya is said to have ruled for 75 years and his nephew, Vidyadyumna-Pāņdya, for 81 years.

== Salient features ==
- The heir is a part of the mother's family.
- The inheritance of lineage identity in the form of gotra or in the form of ancestral house is through the mother. Marriage between people of same gotra is prohibited.
- Inheritance is matrilineal, but in all aspects the husband is the head of the household. All Tuluvas practice matrilineal system of living.
- After marriage, it's common for husband to live at his wife's home (though this is not widely practiced in the modern era).
- The uncle is generally the head of the family and is known as "Gurikare" in Tulu, meaning Yajamana in Kannada.
- Among Tuluvas, brothers usually manage the matrilineal family land on behalf of their sister.

== Matrilineal communities ==
- Jain
- Billava
- Bunts (except Parivara Bunts)
- Devadiga
- Mogaveera
- Kulala

== See also ==
- Matrilineality
- Matrilineal succession
