= Matrilineal succession =

Hereditary succession through female relatives

Matrilineal succession is a form of hereditary succession or other inheritance through which the subject's female relatives are traced back in a matrilineal line.

== Systems ==
- Matrileneal system is found in the Nair community of Kerala, India. The throne is inherited through the female ancestor. The present day women empowerment and educational upstate in the region is the direct reflection of the matrilineal system which was later adopted by the common people from the ruling community.
- matrilineal primogeniture where the eldest female child of the subject is entitled to the hereditary succession before her younger sisters, and her brothers are not entitled at all.
- matrilineal ultimogeniture where the youngest daughter is the heir. This system is found among the Khasis of India.
- rotation among female relatives.
- matrilineal seniority, where the eldest sister is succeeded by her next eldest sister, etc., until the surviving sisters have had their turns, at which point the females of the next generation, daughters of these "original" sisters will have their turns, in order of seniority.

== Other examples ==
=== Europe ===
==== Ancient Greece ====
While men held positions of religious and political power, the Spartan constitution mandated that inheritance and proprietorship pass from mother to daughter.

==== Ancient Scotland ====
In Pictish society, succession in leadership (later kingship) was matrilineal (through the mother's side), with the reigning chief succeeded by either his brother or perhaps a nephew but not through patrilineal succession of father to son.

Asia

The matrilineal succession is prevalent among many sects in Asia. In India, these include the Marumakkathayam among the Nair and Malabar Muslims in Kerala, the Aliyasantana system among the Tulu Bunts as well as the matrilineal traditions which exist among the Khasi and Garo of Meghalaya.

In Kerala, Marumakkathayam was practiced by the Nair nobility, certain Nambudiri, Ambalavasi and the Malabar Muslims. Through this system, descent and the inheritance of property were passed from the maternal uncle to nephews or nieces. The right of the child was with the maternal uncle or the mother's family rather than the father or the father's family. Through this bloodline, surnames, titles, properties, and everything of the child are inherited from his maternal uncle or mother. Almost all the kingdoms in Kerala practised this system. The Arakkal kingdom followed a similar matrilineal system of descent: the eldest member of the family, whether male or female, became its head and ruler; the male rulers were called Ali Rajas and the female rulers were called as Arakkal Beevis. Usually after one king, his nephew through his sister succeeded to the throne, and his own son receives a courtesy title but has no place in the line of succession. In the absence of nephews, nieces could also succeed to the kingdom, as in the case of Queen Gowri Lakshmi Bayi who was the queen regnant from 1810 to 1813. Since Indian Independence and the passing of several acts such as the Hindu Succession Act (1956), this form of inheritance is no longer recognised by law. Regardless, the pretender to the Travancore throne is still determined by matrilineal succession.

One of the early dynasties of China had similar practices. Historians postulate that there, a father-in-law was typically succeeded by his son-in-law. However, this again is obviously not a female succeeding a female, but a form of succession by appointment: the monarch chose his successor, and formalized that appointment by marrying the chosen man with a royal daughter, which also worked as a way to legitimize the succession.

Similar traditions exist among the Minangkabau culture of West Sumatra, the Nakhi of China, the Gitksan of British Columbia, the Iroquois Confederacy (Haudenosaunee), the Hopi and the Berbers.

=== Africa ===
Some traditional kingdoms in Africa, such as Kumbwada, Arnado Debbo, and Nhakatolo of Luvale, has been only ruled by hereditary queens.

The Lozi kingdom's south has been only ruled by hereditary queens known as the Litunga la Mboela.

The order of succession to the position of the Rain Queen is an example in an African culture of matrilineal primogeniture: not only is dynastic descent reckoned through the female line, but only females are eligible to inherit.

The Akans of Ghana and the Ivory Coast, in West Africa have similar matrilineal succession and as such Otumfuo Nana Osei Tutu II, Asantehene inherited the Golden Stool (the throne) through his mother (the Asantehemaa) Nana Afia Kobi Serwaa Ampem II.

== Consequences ==
In societies using matrilineal descent, the social relationship between children and their biological father tends to be different because he is not a member of their matrilineal family. For example, the man who would have the formal responsibilities that Western cultures assign to a father would be a boy's mother's brother, since he is the closest elder male kinsman.

Similarly, inheritance patterns for men in matrilineal societies often reflect the importance of the mother's brother. For example, in the Ashanti Kingdom of Central Ghana, a king traditionally passes his title and status on to his sister's son. A king's own biological son does not inherit the kingship because he is not a member of the ruling matrilineal family group. Women usually inherit status and property directly from their mothers in matrilineal societies.
