= Mugera people =

Mugera people, otherwise known as Mera people is a Scheduled Caste of Tulu Nadu, India mainly spread in the areas of modern Kasaragod District of Kerala and Mangalore, Udupi, Coorg Districts of Karnataka. They follow a matriarchal family system called "Bari". The language spoken by Mera is Tulu.
