= Shivalli Brahmins =

Hindu Brahmin community

Shivalli Brahmin
Regions with significant populations
- Tulunad; Shimoga District, Karnataka; Bhatkal Taluk, Karnataka

Languages
- Tulu, Kannada, Sanskrit

Religion
- Hinduism; Divisions based on sect: Smarthism; Madhwas; Divisions based on Veda; Rigveda; Yajur Veda

Related ethnic groups
- Kota Brahmin • Koteshwara Brahmin • Other Tulu People

The Shivalli Brahmins are a Tuluva Brahmin community mainly in Tulunad region of southwest India. They are divided into two groups: the first follows the Dvaita philosophy founded by the Vaishnava saint Madhvacharya of Udupi and its members are called Shivalli Madhva Brahmins, and the second follows the Advaita philosophy of Adi Shankara whose members are known as Shivalli Smartha Brahmins. The majority of Shivalli Brahmins (Shivalli Brahmana's) are Madhvas and only a few of them are Smarthas.

== Udupi cuisine ==
Shivalli Brahmins are famous for Udupi hotels (vegetarian restaurants) known for serving typical south Indian dishes like idli, vada, dosa, shira and upma etc. Shivalli Brahmins have a unique style of cooking, serving and eating meals. The meal is served on a plantain (banana) leaf and is usually eaten by hand, seated with padmasana-like position on the floor.

== Rituals and customs ==
=== Rituals ===
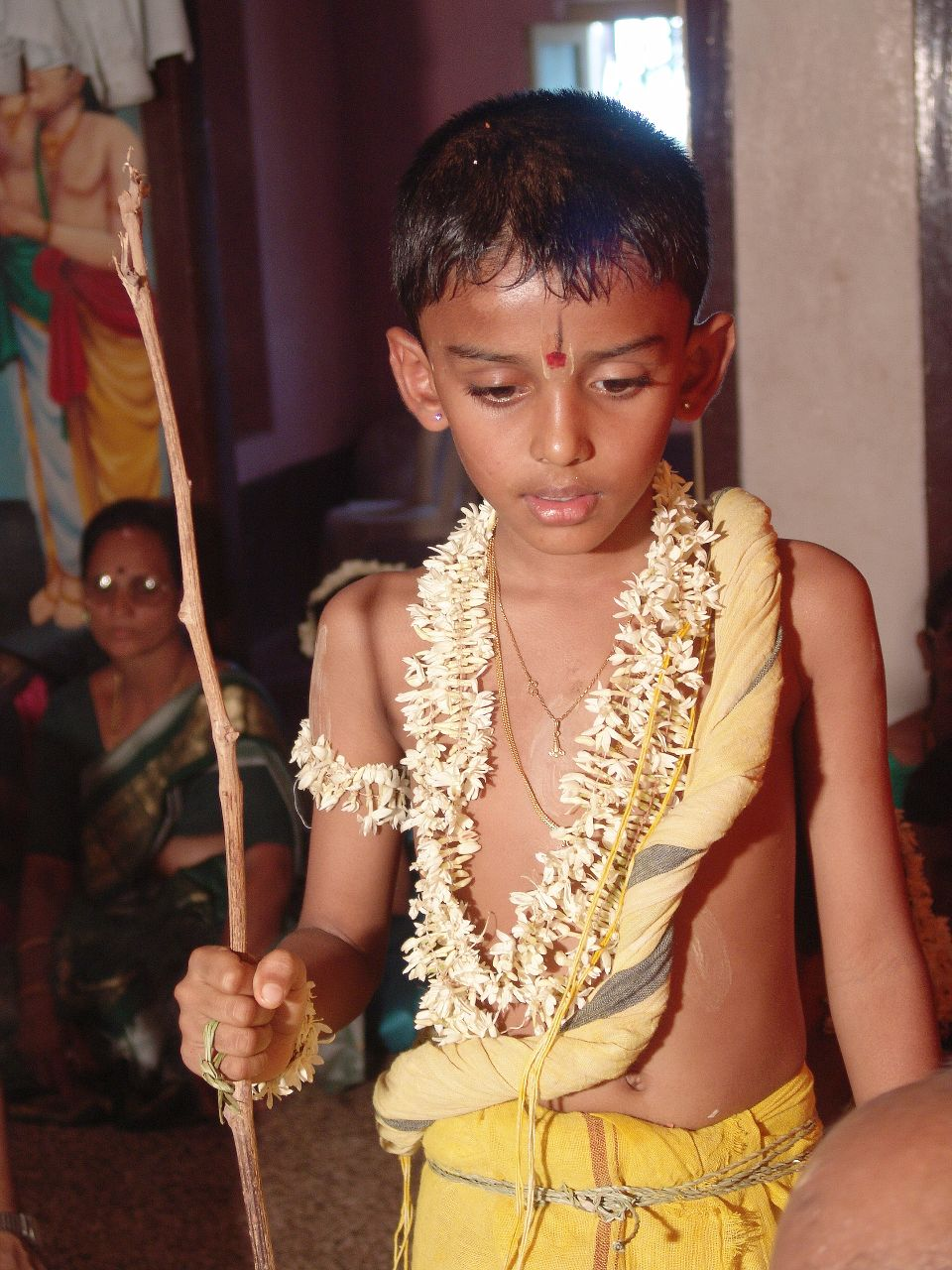
A young Shivalli Brahmin boy during his upanayana

Shivalli Brahmin males undergo the Upanayana when they turn seven years old to initiate them into Vedic studies. It is also known as Brahmopadesham. The key ritual during the Upanayana is that of putting a sacred thread consisting of three cotton strands across the left shoulder of the boy, called Janivara. The initiate is called a dvija "twice-born" and is expected to perform the sandhyavandanam at least twice daily. Dvija has a special knot in it which is called as "Brahma Gantu". Shivalli Madhwa Brahmins also undergo the Upakarma, where the sacred thread is changed once a year and mudradharana is performed. Mudradharana is a ritual where Vaishnavite symbols like the conch or the wheel are etched on bodies as a ritual of purification.

=== Marriage ===
Present day marriages of Shivalli Madhva Brahmins are a four-day ceremony, sometimes condensed to a single day due to the fast pace of today's life. On the occasion of wedding, three more strands are added to the sacred thread Janivara.

== Festivals ==
Shivalli Brahmins celebrate all major Hindu festivals such as Ganesh Chaturthi, Deepavali, Navaratri, Sankranti, Madhwanavami, Janmashtami, Maha Shivaratri, Bisu Parba(Tulu New Year), Ramanavami, Hanuman Jayanthi etc. They also believe in Nagaradhane and rituals of Bhuta Kola.

== Eminent Shivalli Madhva Brahmana's ==
- Bannanje Govindacharya
- V.S.Acharya
- K. K. Hebbar
- S. U. Paniyadi
- H.V.K. Udupa
- K. N. Udupa
- B.Vittalacharya
- Harini (Kannada actress)
- Uliyar Padmanabha Upadhyaya
- P.Gururaja Bhat
- B.V.Acharya
- Vyasaraya Ballal

== See also ==
- Ashta Mathas of Udupi
- Tuluva Brahmins
- Ahichatra
- Nambudiri
- Krishnapura matha
- Paryaya
- Havyaka Brahmin
