= Tulu people =

Dravidian ethnic group of southwestern India

Tuluvas
Tuḷuvarŭ
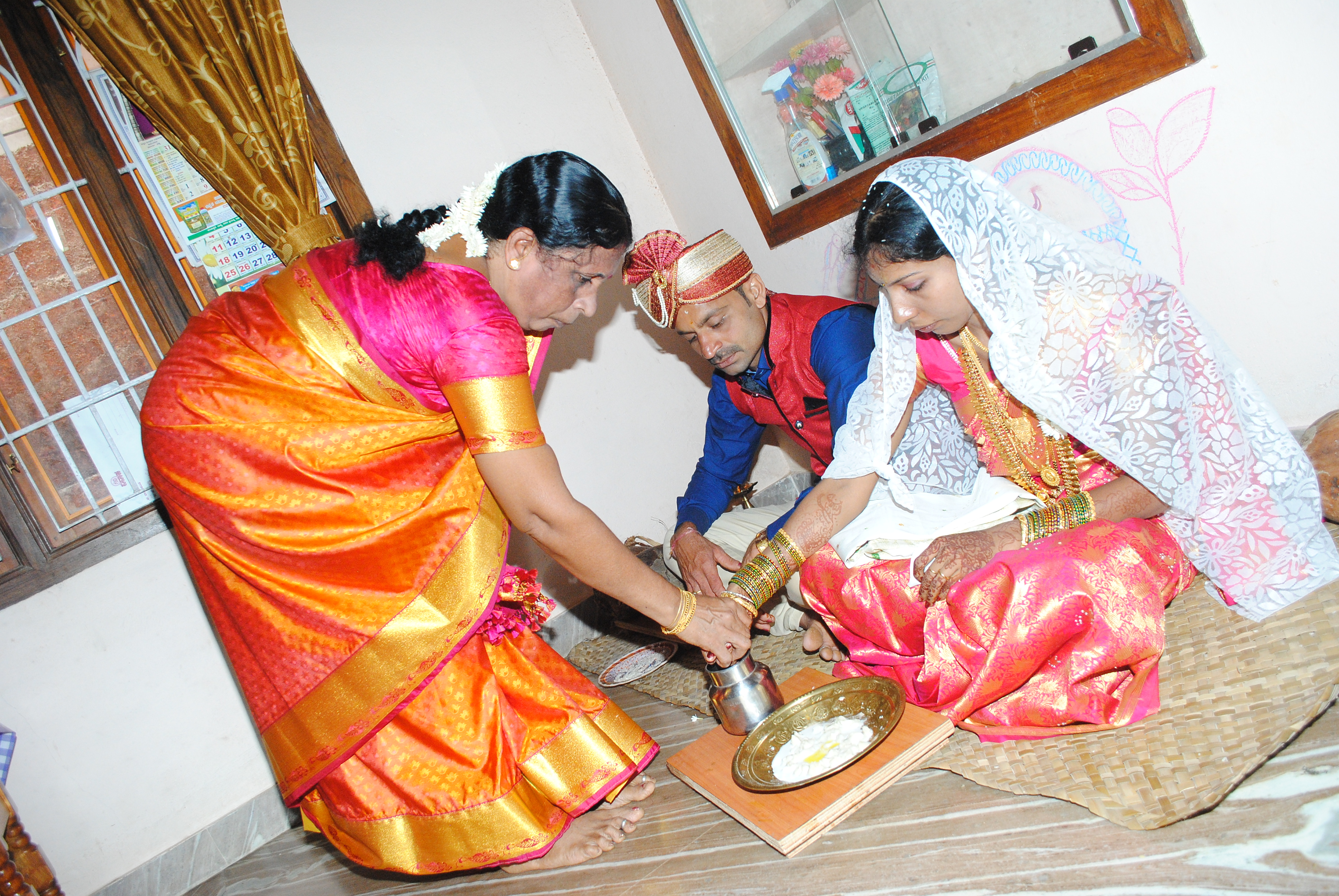
- Tulu family

Total population
- c. 1.8 million

Regions with significant populations
- India: 1,846,427 (2011 census)

Languages
- Tulu

Religion
- Majority: Hinduism; Minority: Jainism, Christianity, Beary (Islam)

Related ethnic groups
- Pancha-Dravida, Malayalis, Kannadigas, Konkanis, Kodavas

- Person: Tuḷuve
- People: Tuḷuverŭ
- Language: Tuḷu
- Country: Tuḷu Nāḍŭ

The Tulu people or Tuluvas are a Dravidian ethnic group native to the Tulu Nadu region of South India. They share a common ancestry, culture, and natively speak the Tulu language. Tulu Nadu comprises the districts of Dakshina Kannada, Mangalore, and Udupi in Karnataka, part of Kasaragod district in Kerala, with Mangalore, Karnataka being the commercial hub. The Census report of 2011 reported a population of 1,846,427 native Tulu speakers living in India.

== Etymology ==
According to Keralolpathi, the name Tuluva comes from that of one of the Cheraman Perumal kings of Kerala, who fixed his residence in the northern portion of his dominions just before its separation from Kerala, and who was called Tulubhan Perumal.

== Mythology ==
According to mythology, Tulu Nadu was reclaimed by Parashurama from the sea. According to the 17th-century Malayalam work Keralolpathi, the lands of Kerala and Tulu Nadu were recovered from the Arabian Sea by the axe-wielding warrior sage Parashurama, the sixth avatar of Vishnu (hence, Kerala is also called Parashurama Kshetram 'The Land of Parashurama'). Parashurama threw his axe across the sea, and the water receded as far as it reached. According to legend, this new area of land extended from Gokarna to Kanyakumari. The land which rose from sea was filled with salt and unsuitable for habitation, so Parashurama invoked the snake king Vasuki, who spat holy poison and converted the soil into fertile lush green land. Out of respect, Vasuki and all snakes were appointed as protectors and guardians of the land. P. T. Srinivasa Iyengar theorised, that Senguttuvan may have been inspired by the Parashurama legend, which was brought by early Aryan settlers.

== People and identity ==
Tulu speakers are divided into various castes. The major Tulu speaking castes are:

- Bunts
- Mansas
- Billavas
- Madivala
- Shettigars
- Tulu Gowdas
- Devadigas
- Kulalas
- Koragas
- Mogaveeras
- Tulu Brahmins
- Vishwakarmas
- Naiks
- Tulu Bhandary

Mangalorean Protestants and Mangalorean Jains are also Tulu speakers.

== Culture ==
Tulu Baase written in Tigalari script

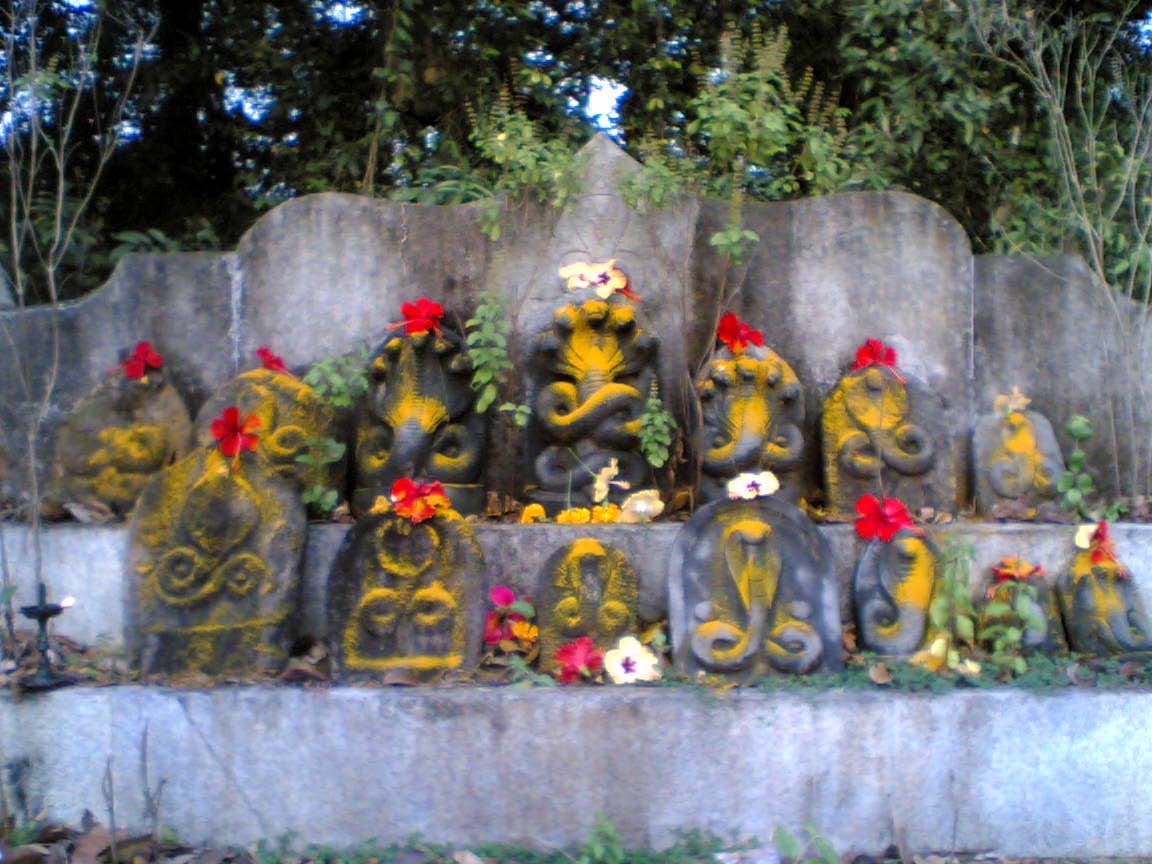
Nagabana: The Nāga deities are worshipped in sacred groves

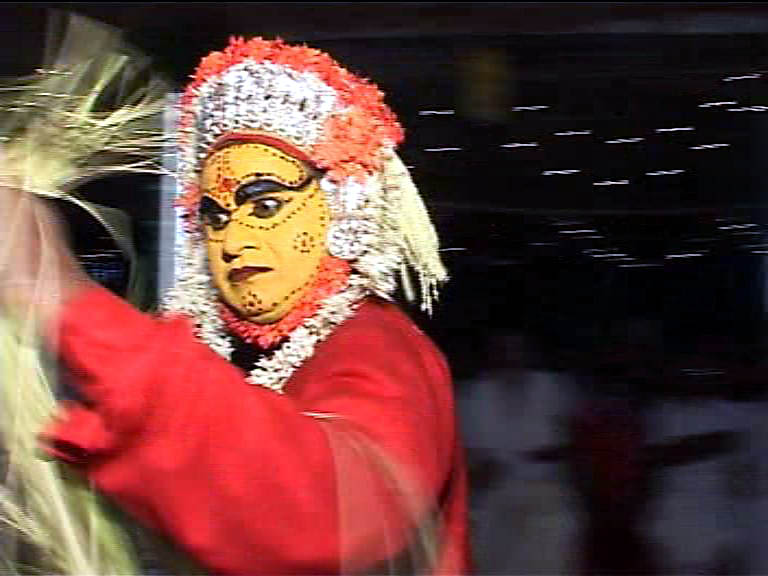
Ritual dance performing the Buta Kola dance in honour of the deities worshipped by Tulu speakers

Tuluvas follow a matrilineal system of inheritance known as Aliyasantana, where inheritance is from uncle to nephew, except for Brahmins, Tulu Gowda, Shettigar caste and Vishwakarmas. It is similar to the Marumakkathayam of Kerala. Other distinctive features include the rituals of Yakshagana, Bhuta Kola, Nagaradhane Aati kalenja and Kambala. Bhuta Kola is similar to Theyyam in North Malabar region.

Tuluva New Year, called Bisu Parba, falls on the same day as Baisakhi, Vishu and the Thai New Year.

Tuluva Paddanas are sung narratives, which are part of several closely related singing traditions in Tulu language. They are sung during occasions which describe the evolution of Tulu tribes and Tulu culture.

=== Buta Kola ===
Bhuta-aradhana (lit. 'spirit worship' or 'soul worship'; a bhuta or bhoota is a supernatural creature, or spiritual entity, especially of ancestors) in Tulu Nadu is similar to the rest of South India, though the bhutas and forms of worship differ. The kola or nema is the yearly ceremony celebrating the festival of bhutas. They have attained a godly status among some worshippers, mainly non-Brahmins, and even have their own bhuta-sthanas (a place of abode similar to temples). However, in many villages the Brahmins, who consider these spirits as their protectorates, conduct the yearly ceremonies.

A Tulu folk tale from Thokuru Guttu

Bhuta, who may be considered local deities, can be animistic as in Panjurli (boar) or Pili-bhuta (tiger). A second variety can be representatives of characters taken out of the Puranas like Bermer (Brahma), Lekkesiri (Raktesvari, Kali) or Vishnumurti. A third category is deified human beings like Gulige, Annappe, and Koti-Chananye. The fourth kind is strictly local characters like Male-Chandi (from the male-Nadu), Ullaldi (from Ullal), and Malaraye (from the Ghats). Then there are bhutas that provide comical relief during nemas, namely Marlu-Jumadi (crazy Jumadi) or Potte (mute–deaf demigod). Newer bhutas also have been added, like Posa-bhuta (new demigod), Vokku-Ballala, and Muttappe.

The 2022 film Kantāra, directed and acted by Rishabh Shetty depicts the ritual, as well as cites the importance of Kul Devtās (Clan Deities)

== Demand for a Tulu Nadu state ==
From India's independence and following the reorganization of states, the Tuluvas have been demanding national language status for Tulu and a separate state for themselves called Tulu Nadu ('land of Tuluvas'), based on their language and distinct culture. Though somewhat subdued for a while, this demand has grown stronger in recent years. Several organizations like the Tulu Rajya Horata Samiti have taken up the cause of the Tuluvas, and frequent meetings and demonstrations are held across towns in Tulunadu (such as Mangalore and Udupi) to voice their demands.

== See also ==
- Udupi cuisine
- Tulu language
- Gokak agitation
