= Marumakkathayam =

Former system of matrilineal inheritance in Kerala, India

Marumakkathayam was a system of matrilineal inheritance prevalent in regions of the Indian state of Kerala. It is similar to the Aliyasanthana system followed by the Bunt community in Karnataka.

The word "Marumakkathayam" originated from the Malayalam word "marumakkal" also known as "Anandaravar", which means "sister's child", "nephews", or "nieces" in English.

Through this system, descent and the inheritance of property were passed from the maternal uncle to nephews or nieces.

The right of the child was with the maternal uncle or the mother's family rather than the father or the father's family. Through this bloodline, surnames, titles, properties, and everything of the child are inherited from his uncle or mother.

The joint family under the matrilineal system is known as Tharavad also knowns Kudumbakkar or veedu, formed the nucleus of the society. The eldest male was considered the head of the family, known as the karanavar, and he controlled all the family assets. However, his sons did not inherit the properties; instead, inheritance went to the children of his sisters.

This system was not matriarchal as is sometimes misinterpreted, and was strongly patriarchal with only a male allowed to be the head of the family.

== Origin ==
One popular theory pertains to the ancient martial tradition of the Nairs. Boys were sent to military training or warfare at the age of eight, dedicating themselves solely to mastering the art of warfare and rule the Kingdom. For them, death by any means other than on the battlefield was a shameful disgrace. Driven by an unwavering commitment to military excellence, glorious bloodshed and honorable combat, they prioritized martial pursuits over familial or economic endeavors. As a result, they had no time for family reunions, thus the responsibility for the upbringing of their children fell upon the mother or her family. Indeed, this emphasis on martial prowess and a warrior's code of honor is often cited as the foundation of the matrilineal succession system, which is later influenced others.

== Modern changes and adaptations ==
The customary law of inheritance was codified by the Madras Marumakkathayam Act 1932, Madras Act No. 22 of 1933, published in the Fort St. George Gazette on 1 August 1933.

Malabar District was part of the Madras Presidency in British India. In the Madras Marumakkathayam Act 1932, "Marumakkathayam" is defined as the system of inheritance in which descent is traced by females, and "Marumakkathayee" means a person governed by the Marumakkathayam law of inheritance. The system of inheritance was abolished by The Joint Family System (Abolition) Act, 1975, by the Kerala State Legislature.

By the beginning of the 20th century, marumakkathayam was increasingly seen as an undesirable remnant of a feudal past, and discontented groups including Nair and Ambalavasi men sought to bring reform. The reforms were pushed through in spite of opposition from conservative factions led by Kesava Pillai of Kandamath in the Travancore Court, Sree Mulam State Council and by leading members of society such as C. V. Raman Pillai in the states of Cochin and Travancore, and the British Indian province of Malabar, which later joined together to form Kerala in 1957.

== Matrilineal communities ==
Matrilineal system or marumakkathayam is traditionally followed by Royal families, Nairs, Ambalavasi and some Nambudiri Brahmin families.

== See also ==
- Aliyasantana
- Matrilineal succession
