= Koteshwara Brahmin =

Indian Hindu Brahmin subcaste

Regions with significant populations
- Karnataka, India

Languages
- Kannada, Tulu, Sanskrit

Religion
- Hinduism (Vaishnava)

Related ethnic groups
- Shivalli Brahmin • Kota Brahmin

Koteshwara Brahmins (also known as Koteshwara Magane Brahmins) are a Hindu Brahmin sub-caste mainly from the Indian state of Karnataka. The community is mainly concentrated in the Koteshwara, Kundapur, and surrounding areas of Udupi district in Karnataka. The community takes its name from the village Koteshwara, which is their native place. Koteshwara Brahmins follow the Dvaita Vedanta propounded by Madhvacharya and are followers of Sodhe Vadiraja Swami Matha.

== See also ==
- Shivalli Brahmins
