= Billava =

Ethnic group from southwest India

Regions with significant populations
- Tulu Nadu

Languages
- Tulu; Kundagannada

The Billava (IPA: [bilːɐʋɐ]), Billoru, Biruveru people are an ethnic Tuluva group of India. They constitute 18% of the coastal Karnataka population. They are found traditionally in Tulu Nadu region and primarily engaged in toddy tapping, cultivation and other activities. They have used both missionary education and Sri Narayana Guru's reform movement to upgrade themselves.

== Etymology and origins ==
The Billavas are first recorded in inscriptions dating from the fifteenth century AD, but Amitav Ghosh notes that "... this is merely an indication of their lack of social power; there is every reason to suppose that all the major Tuluva castes share an equally long history of settlement in the region". The earliest epigraphy for the Tuluva Bunt community dates to around 400 years earlier.

L. K. Ananthakrishna Iyer recounted the community's belief that billava means bowmen and that it "applied to the castemen who were largely employed as soldiers by the native rulers of the district". Edgar Thurston had reached a similar conclusion in 1909. (Note: L. K. Ananthakrishna Iyer's The Mysore Tribes and Castes, published in 1930, contains numerous sentences that appear also in Edgar Thurston's The Castes and Tribes of Southern India of 1909. In turn, Thurston's work used material that had previously been published by other British Raj sources, and not always with clear attribution of this fact. This situation makes it difficult to distinguish individual opinions and it has to be understood in the context of the multiple publications produced under the aegis of the Ethnographic Survey of India that was established in 1901 on the basis of the work of Herbert Hope Risley.)

== Language ==
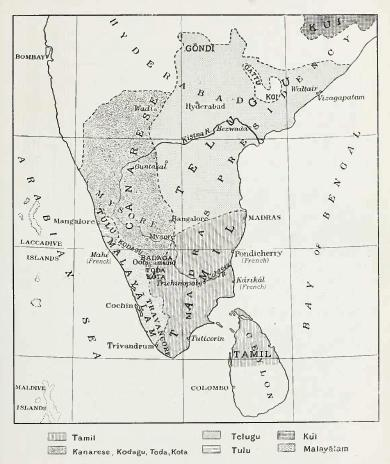
Linguistic map of the Madras Presidency, ca. 1913.

There is a complex linguistic environment in Tulu Nadu, which is the area of India to which the Billavas trace their origin. A compact geographic area, Tulu Nadu lies on the coastal belt of Karnataka and Kerala and has natural boundaries in the form of the Arabian Sea, the hills of the Western Ghats and the rivers Suvarna and Chandragiri. It includes the South Canara district of Karnataka and the Kasaragod area of Kerala, which were formerly united for administrative purposes within the Madras Presidency. Although many languages and dialects are traditionally to be found there—for example, Tulu, Kannada, Konkani and Marathi—it is the first two of these that are common throughout, and of those two it is Tulu that gave rise to the region's name.

Traditionally, Kannada is used in formal situations such as education, while Tulu is the lingua franca used in everyday communication. Tulu is more accepted as the primary language in the north of the Tulu Nadu region, with the areas south of the Netravati river demonstrating a more traditional, although gradually diminishing, distinction between that language and the situations in which Kannada is to be preferred. A form of the Tulu language known as Common Tulu has been identified, and this is spreading as an accepted standard for formal communication. Although four versions of it exist, based on geographic demarcations and also the concentration of various caste groups within those areas, that version which is more precisely known as Northern Common Tulu is superseding the other three dialects. As of 1998 the Brahmin community use Common Tulu only to speak with those outside their own caste, while communities such as the Bunts, Billavas and Gouds use it frequently, and the tribal communities are increasingly abandoning their own dialects in favour of it.

William Logan's work Manual of Malabar, a publication of the British Raj period, recognised the Billavas as being the largest single community in South Canara, representing nearly 20 per cent of that district's population.

== Marriage, death and inheritance ==
The Billavas practised the matrilineal system of inheritance known as Aliya Kattu or Aliya Santana. Ghosh describes that this system entailed that "men transmit their immovable property, not to their own children, but matrilineally, to their sister's children."

Iyer described the rules regarding marriage as

A Billava does not marry his sister's daughter or mother's sister's daughter. He can marry his paternal aunt's or maternal uncle's daughter. Two sisters can be taken in marriage simultaneously or at different times. Two brothers can marry two sisters.

Marriage of widows was permitted but the wedding ritual in such cases was simplified. An amended version of the ceremony was also used for situations where an illegitimate child might otherwise result: the father had to marry the pregnant woman in such circumstances.

Women were considered to be ritually polluted at the time of their first menstrual cycle and also during the period of pregnancy and childbirth.

The Billava dead are usually cremated, although burial occurs in some places, and there is a ritual pollution period observed at this time also. The Billava community is one of a few in India that practice posthumous marriage. Others that do so include the Badagas, Komatis and the Todas.

== Subgroups ==
All of the Tuluva castes who participate fully in Bhuta worship also have loose family groupings known as balis. These groups are also referred to as "septs", and are similar to the Brahmin gotras except that their membership is based on matrilineal rather than patrilineal descent. Iyer noted 16 balis within the Billava community and that some of these had further subdivisions. Thurston said of these exogamous Billava groups that "There is a popular belief that these are sub-divisions of the twenty balis which ought to exist according to the Aliya Santana system (inheritance of the female line)."

== Worship of Bhutas ==
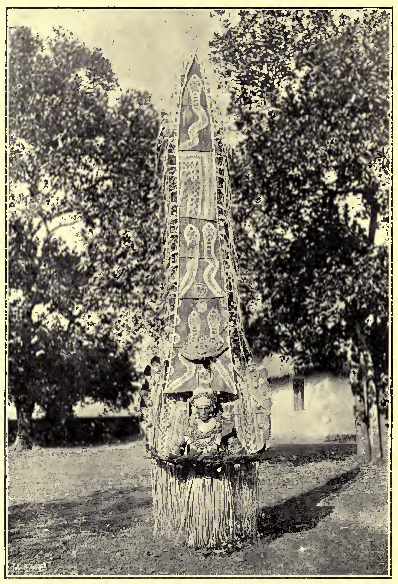
A Paravar performing Nalike (type of dance in Bhoota Kola), ca. 1909.

The Billavas were among the many communities to be excluded from the Hindu temples of Brahmins and they traditionally worship spirits in a practice known as Bhuta Kola. S. D. L. Alagodi wrote in 2006 of the South Canara population that "Among the Hindus, a little over ten per cent are Brahmins, and all the others, though nominally Hindus, are really propitiators or worshippers of tutelary deities and bhutas or demons."

The venues for Bhuta Kola are temple structures called Bhutasthana or Garidi (Note: Thurston called the Bhutasthana "devil shrines" and appears to distinguish them from Garidi but does not explain why he did so: "Some Billavas officiate as priests (pujaris) at bhutasthanas (devil shrines) and garidis.") as well as numerous shrines. The officiators at worship are a subcaste of Billavas, known as Poojary (priest), and their practices are known as pooja. Iyer noted that families often have a place set aside in their home for the worship of a particular Bhuta and that the worship in this situation is called Bhuta Nema.

Iyer, who considered the most prevalent of the Billava Bhutas to be the twin heroes Koti and Chennayya, also described the spirits as being of people who when living had

... acquired a more than usual local reputation whether for good or evil, or had met with a sudden or violent death. In addition to these, there are demons of the jungle, and demons of the waste, demons who guard the village boundaries, and demons whose only apparent vocation is that of playing tricks, such as throwing stones on houses and causing mischief generally.

More recently, Ghosh has described a distinction between the Bhuta of southern India, as worshipped by the Billavas, and the similarly named demons of the north

In northern India the word bhuta generally refers to a ghost or a malign presence. Tulu bhutas, on the other hand, though they have their vengeful aspects, are often benign, protective figures, ancestral spirits and heroes who have been assimilated to the ranks of minor deities.

Bhuta Kola is a cult practised by a large section of Tulu Nadu society, ranging from landlords to the Dalits, and the various hierarchical strands all have their place within it. While those at the top of this hierarchical range provide patronage, others such as the Billava provide the practical services of officiating and tending the shrines, while those at the bottom of the hierarchy enact the rituals, which include aspects akin to the regional theatrical art forms known as Kathakali and Yakshagana. For example, the pooja rituals include devil-dancing, performed by the lower class Paravar (Note: Iyer called these devil-dancers the Pombada but Thurston refers to the Paravar community.) or Naike, and the Bunts – who were historically ranked as superior to the Billava (Note: Amitav Ghosh quotes Francis Buchanan, who said of the Billava that they "pretend to be Shudras, but acknowledge their inferiority to the Bunts." Shudra is the lowest ritual rank in the Hindu varna system, below which are the outcastes. Buchanan travelled through South Canara in 1801, soon after the British took control of it. Ghosh notes that "until quite recently [the Bunts] controlled most of the land in Tulunad" and their influence in Bhuta worship was notable because of this.)– rely upon the Poojary to officiate.

There was a significance in the Bunt landholdings and the practice of Bhuta worship. As the major owners of land, the Bunts held geographic hubs around which their tenant farmers and other agricultural workers were dispersed. The Billavas, being among the dispersed people, were bonded to their landlords by the necessities of livelihood and were spread so that they were unable to unite in order to assert authority. Furthermore, the Bhuta belief system also provided remedies for social and legal issues: it provided a framework for day-to-day living.

Thurston noted that Baidya was a common name among the community, as was Poojary. He was told that this was a corruption of Vaidya, meaning a physician.

== Traditional occupations ==
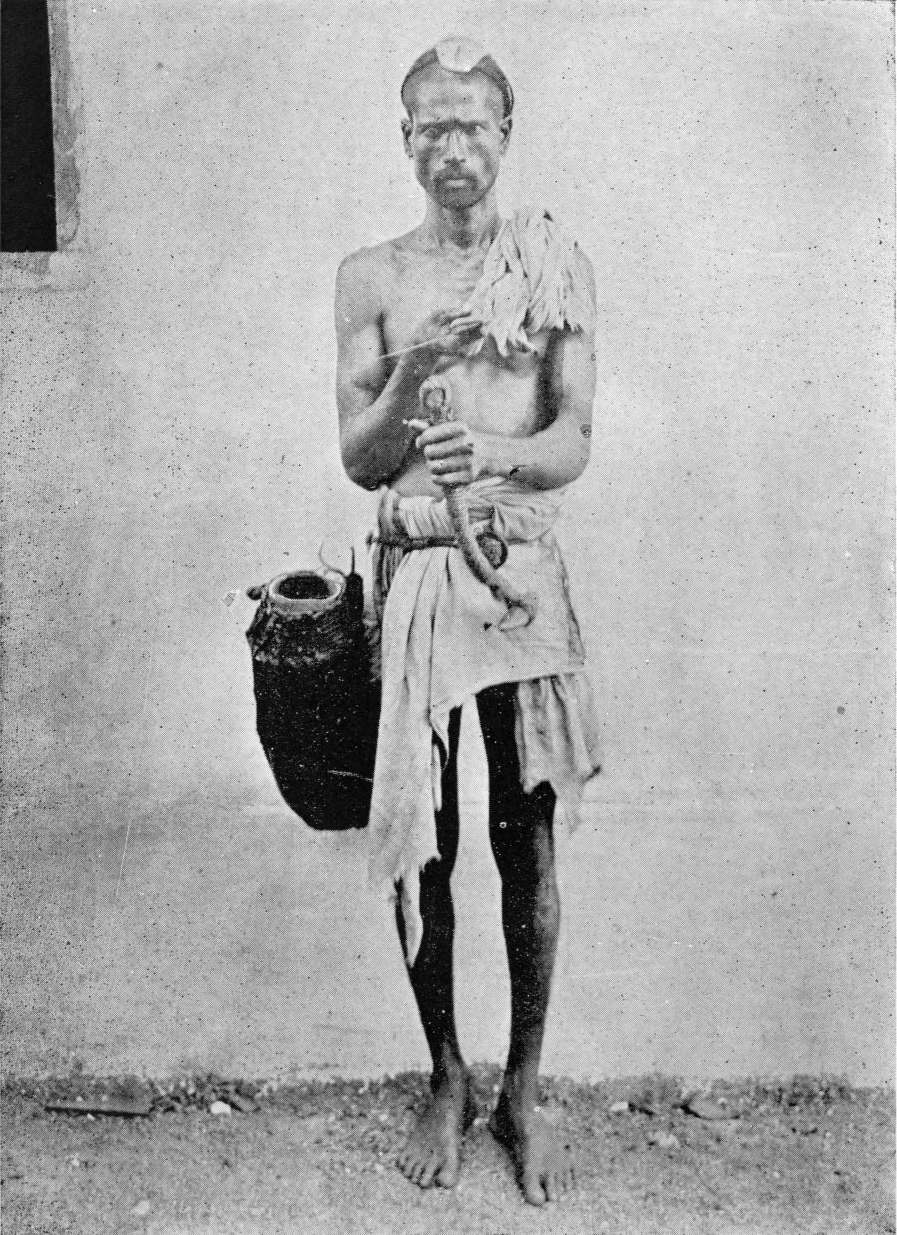
A Billava toddy tapper, ca. 1909

Heidrun Brückner describes the Billavas of the nineteenth century as "frequently small tenant farmers and agricultural labourers working for Bunt landowners." Writing in 1930, Iyer described the community as being involved mostly in toddy tapping, although they also had involvements in agriculture and in some areas were so in the form of peasant tenant landholders known as raiyats. This was echoed in a report of the Indian Council of Agricultural Research of 1961, which said that "The Billavas are concentrated mostly in South Kanara district. Though toddy tappers by profession, they rely mostly on cultivation. They are generally small landowners or lessees ..."

According to Ghosh, "By tradition, [the Billavas] are also associated with the martial arts and the single most famous pair of Tuluva heroes, the brothers Koti-Chennaya, are archetypal heroes of the caste who symbolize the often hostile competition between the Billavas and the Bunts." Neither Thurston nor Iyer make any reference to this claim.

== Culture ==
Tuluva paddanas are sung narratives which are part of several closely related singing traditions, similar to Vadakkan Pattukal (Northern ballads) of northern Kerala and which may be considered ballads, epics or ritual songs (depending on the context or purpose for which they are sung). The community has special occasions in which it is traditional to sing paddanas. They will sing the Paddana of Koti-Chennaya during a ceremony on the eve of a marriage. Women who sing the song in the fields will sing those verses appropriate for the young heroes.

== Social changes ==
The Billava community suffered ritual discrimination under the Brahmanic system—of which the caste system in Kerala was perhaps the most extreme example until the twentieth century. They were, however, allowed to live in the same villages as Brahmins.

Some Billavas had seen the possibility of using religion as a vehicle for the social advancement of their community, as the Paravars had previously attempted in their conversion to Christianity. The British had wrested the region from the control of Tipu Sultan in 1799, as a consequence of the Fourth Anglo-Mysore War, and in 1834 the Christian Basel Mission arrived in Mangalore. These evangelists were among the first to take advantage of a relaxation of rules that had prevented non-British missionaries from working in India, and theirs was the first Protestant mission of any nationality in the area. They initially condemned the caste system because it was an inherent part of the Hindu religion and therefore must be wrong, but they came to see the divisions caused by it as being evil in their own right and took to undermining it as a matter of social justice. They considered the stratification of the caste system as being contrary to Christian values, which proclaimed that all were equal in the eyes of God. These missionaries had some success in converting native people, of which those converted from among the Billavas formed the "first and largest group". Brückner describes the Billavas as being "the strongest group among the converts" and that, along with the Bunts, they were "the mainstays of the popular local religion, and the mission was probably induced by this target group to occupy itself with its practices and oral literature."

Alagodi notes that the

... motives for conversion were not always purely religious. Support against oppression by landlords and money lenders, hope for better social standards, education for their children, chances of employment in the mission's firms, the prospect of food provision, clothing, shelter and a decent state of life—such motives might have contributed to their decision for baptism. The chief motive, however, seems to have been a revolt against the social order dominated by demons or bhutas. The conversion offered them forgiveness of sin and liberation from the social conditions that would hold them back if they remained in the Hindu fold. ... Many people thought that the God of the missionaries was greater and more powerful than the demons.

However, the conversion of Billavas to Christianity did not always run smoothly. The Basel missionaries were more concerned with the quality of those converted than with the quantity. In 1869 they rejected a proposition that 5000 Billavas would convert if the missionaries would grant certain favours, including recognition of the converts as a separate community within the church and also a dispensation to continue certain of their traditional practices. The missionaries took the view that the proposition was contrary to their belief in equality and that it represented both an incomplete rejection of the caste system and of Hindu practices. Alagodi has speculated that if the proposition had been accepted then "Protestant Christians would have been perhaps one of the largest religious communities in and around Mangalore today." A further barrier to conversion proved to be the Billava's toddy tapping occupation: the Basel Mission held no truck with alcohol, and those who did convert found themselves economically disadvantaged, often lacking both a job and a home. This could apply even if they were not toddy tappers: as tenant farmers or otherwise involved in agriculture, they would lose their homes and the potential beneficence of their landlords if they converted. The Mission attempted to alleviate this situation by provision of work, principally in factories that produced tiles and woven goods. (Note: The first of seven weaving factories operated by the Basel Mission was established in 1851, and the first of a similar number of tile factories in 1865.)

Nireshvalya Arasappa—described by Kenneth Jones as "one of the few educated Billavas"—was one such person who looked to conversion from Hinduism as a means to advancement during the nineteenth century. Having initially examined the opportunities provided by Christian conversion, Arasappa became involved with the Brahmo Samaj movement in the 1870s and he arranged for Brahmo missionaries to meet with his community. The attempt met with little success: the Billavas were suspicious of the Brahmo representatives, who wore western clothing and spoke in English whereas the Basel Missionaries had studied the local languages and produced a copy of the New Testament in both Tulu and Kannada.

=== Kudroli Gokarnanatheshwara Temple ===
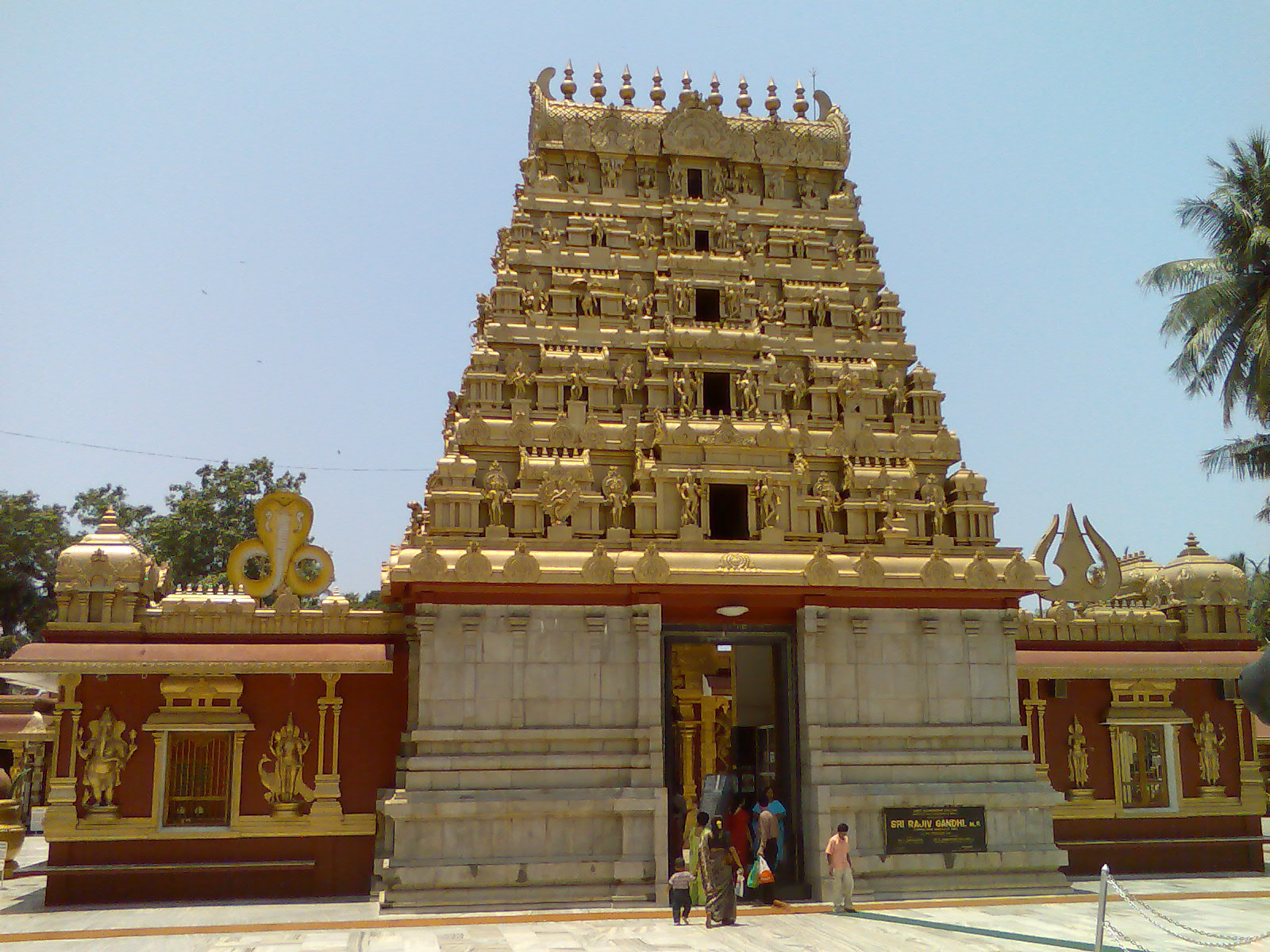
Gokarnanatheshwara Temple

Ezhavas, a kindred community from Kerala, were organised by Narayana Guru in establishing social equality through his temple in Sivagiri. Using the same principles, Billavas established a temple. After the construction of the Kudroli Gokarnanatheshwara Temple at Mangalore, Naryana Guru asked community leaders to work together for mutual progress by organising schools and industrial establishments; in accordance with his wishes, many Sree Narayana organisations have sprung up in the community.

== Similar communities ==
- Namadhari Naik
- Ezhava
