= Devadiga =

Temple servant community located in Karnataka, India

Devadiga (Sanskrit: देवाडिगः, romanized: Dēvāḍiga) also known as Moily, Sherigar is a Hindu community or caste. Devadigas were traditionally temple servants and musicians in Hindu temples. Devadigas are originally from the land stretching between Karwar in Uttara Kannada district of Karnataka and Kasaragod district of Kerala and some parts of Maharashtra in west-coast of India up to the Chandragiri River and many people live in Shivamogga and Chikmagalur too. It is believed that their two divisions, namely Kannada Devadiga (Moily) and Tulu Devadiga (Moily); were endogamous in the past.

== Demography ==
Devadigas are originally from the land stretching between Karwar in Uttara Kannada district of Karnataka and Kasaragod district of Kerala in west-coast of India up to the Chandragiri River and Many People live in Shivamogga and Chikmagalur too. The Tulu Devadiga speak Tulu, while the Kannada Devadiga speak Kannada within their respective family and kin groups. Both groups are conversant with each other's language. In Kerala, they speak Malayalam and Kannada languages with outsides. Both Kannada and Malayalam scripts are used.

== Etymology ==
In Kittel's Kannada-English dictionary book, authored by Rev. F. Kittel and published in the year A.D. 1894, on page 805, the word 'Devadiga' is defined as "dēva-aḍiga. (Śmd. 239). an attendant upon an idol; a caste". In general the term "Devadiga" is derived from deva (deity of the temple), and adiga (servants) i.e., Servant of God. In other term Deva means Deity and Divine Spirits of servant of temple. Adiga or Aadiga means: a player or servant(in temple). One of the important work assigned to Devadiga in the temples is playing the role of official temple Spirit (holding a sword accompanied by shivering and dancing) dancing in front of the chief deity of the temple, while the deity is in the process of making divine rounds (known as bali or bali barpini) around the temple precincts. They are also doing variety of additional jobs, such as cleaning, lighting arrays of earthen oil-lamps, and beating the kettle-drum (Nagari), Barrel drum (Chende) or Double drums (Mourii) and sometimes also playing musical instruments in the temple.

== History ==
The Devadigas are Canarese-speaking temple servants in South Canara, concerning whom Mr. H. A. Stuart writes as follows. "This is a class of servants, chiefly musicians in Hindu temples. In the reign of Mayura Varma, who built a number of new temples, it was found that Brahmans could not perform all the services. It was, therefore, ordained by him that the puja or worship alone should be performed by the Brahmans, and that the Stanika Brahmins and Devadigas should perform the other services in the temples. They returned eleven sub-divisions, but only one (Tulu) is numerically important. They are Vaishnavites, and Tulu Brāhmans are their priests.

Tulu is the main language spoken by Devadigas and follow the traditional Tulu system of matrilineal inheritance (Aliya Kattu) and have similar marriage ceremonies like Bunts. Some places in Karnataka (Uttara Kannada, Shimoga, Chikkamagaluru etc.) Devadigas speak Kannada and identifies themselves as Kannada Devadigas and follow the traditional Hindu system of patrilineal inheritance (Makkala kattu) and have similar marriage ceremonies like Brahmins. They returned eleven sub-divisions, but only one (Tulu) is numerically important.

== Social system ==
kinship: The eight matrilineal clans (bari) that have been identified among them are Kundarannaya, Saliyannaya, bangerannaya, Kajjannaya, Kariannaya, Bhuthiannaya, Gujjarannaya and Kochatabettannaya. group endogamy and clan exogamy are the norms. They have exogamous ban (lineages) to regulate the marriage alliances. The baris are: Bangera, Shaliyan, Gujaran, Serian, Addiyar, Gundranna, Uppayana, etc. Surnames based on lineages are in usage. The self-perception of the community is medium and that of others about them is also medium.

== Administration and justice ==
The traditional caste council of Devadiga settles disputes among them. Gurikara is the head of the caste council. Those who violate caste norms are punished by imposition of fine. They have a caste association named as 'Devadiga Sudaraka Sangha' which looks after the welfare of the group. The statutory panchayat plans the welfare and developmental activities such as providing drinking water, roads, etc., to various communities.

== Religion and culture ==
The Devadiga profess Hinduism. They worship kallutty, Guliga, Panjurily, bariray jaran-daya, rahu etc., as family deities. They also worship Arasu manjoshnavar as village deity. They also worship Venkataramana, Rama, krishna, Shiva, Durga parameshwari. Their major sacred centres are kashi, Tirupati, Dharmastala, Sringeri etc., Kula Devata of Devadigas of Barkur Hobli is Shree Ekanatheshwari at Barkur, known since Alupa rule.

In the past, Gurikara (Head of the caste council) had role in sacred performances but now the Brahman have taken their place. The role of the sacred specialist is to perform marriages ceremony and worship. They celebrate Hindu festivals such as krishna Ashtami, Ganesha Chaturthi, Shivaratri, Vishnu and Deepavali, which have religious significance. Conversion to other religion has not taken place, and the people are not involved in socio-religious movements. Devadiga are Vaishnavites, and Tulu Brahmans are their priests. Upanayana ceremony is reportedly performed in some sections of the community. Mainly in Kannada Devadiga (Patrilineal inheritance) families.

== Inter-community relation ==
The role of the Devadiga in temple services as drum beaters and musicians has given them an important position in the inter-community affairs. They accept food and water from the Brahman and Nayar. They exchange food and water with the Bunt, Bhillava, Kulal and others, but traditionally do not exchange the same with Ganiga, muslim, Christian, Marati, Pambada and other Scheduled Catses and Scheduled Tribe communities. They do not encourage intercaste marriages. They share wells and water sources with others. They visit the same religious shrines and participate in the traditional festivals and festivities which are of religious significance.They also have specific role in the temple as musicians. Cultivator-labour relationship exists. They are a few white-collor job-holders and teachers in their community.Political leadership is weak.

== Varna classification ==
The traditional varna system is largely not found in South India. Vadiraja Tirtha (ca. 1480 – ca. 1600), who lived for 120 years was a great Dvaita philosopher, poet, mystic and polymath. There is a belief in currency that he ordained carpenters, goldsmiths, and Devadigas to be treated as Brahmins during their period of stay in temple for doing temple duties by performing a sanctifying ritual.
