= Mogaveera =

Fisherman community of South-Western India

Regions with significant populations
- Tulunad

Languages
- Tulu, Kundagannada

Religion
- Hinduism

Related ethnic groups
- Mukkuvar

Mogaveera is a fishermen community in the Tulunad region of South West India. They dominated the maritime business of the region. Mogaveera people form a community who dominate fishing and marine activities in and around Mangalore and Udupi. The word "Mogaveera" is believed to be derived from the words "Moga" (brave) and "Veera" (warrior), indicating their origins as courageous coastal warriors and sea navigators. Fishing has been the main occupation of the Mogaveeras for centuries. They have developed a deep understanding of the sea, tides, and marine ecosystems. With modernization, many members of the community have also diversified into other professions such as shipping, business, and entrepreneurship, especially in coastal cities and abroad.

== History ==
The Mogaveeras are the fishermen community of Tulu Nadu. a warrior who after the demolition of the kingdom continued to live on river belts and coastal belts and pursue their traditional occupation of fishing.

== Moolasthanas ==
Mogaveeras follow the Moolasthana system of Tulu lineages (Bari system). The origin of Moolasthana. Mogaveera families have acquired lineage surnames based on Moolasthana or the place of their original settlement. Mogaveeras also follow Aliya Kattu, where inheritance of from Uncle to Nephew. The following lineages based surnames are commonly found among the Mogaveera group of communities (in alphabetical order): Amin, Bangera, Chandan, Gujaran, Kanchan, Karkera, Kotian, Kunder, Maindan, Mendon, Naika, Pangal, Puthran, Rao, Salian, Sapaliga, Shriyan, Suvarna, Thingalaya, and Tholar

Barakur region appears to be one of the early settlements of Mogaveeras in particular. Many of the Moolasthanas are located on the sea coast of Barkur, around Hoogde and Bengare. Barakur was a center of royal administration since remote historical dates. Some of the Kings/chieftains that ruled from Barakur could have been from Mogaveera community. Rich Mogaveera merchants owned merchant boats/ships in the earlier days.

== The community institutions ==
The community is well-organized and governed through institutions such as the Dakshina Kannada Mogaveera Mahajana Sabha and similar bodies in Udupi and other coastal regions. These organizations work to promote education, social welfare, and unity within the community. Mogaveera fishing communities traditionally lived in coastal habitations called ‘Pattana’ (=town). The self governed fishery townships or Pattana may be an ancient feature of common to Dravida culture, since even the coasts of Tamilnadu have similar historically old habitations called Pattanas.

The fishing communities at Pattana level are well organized into ‘Grama-sabha’ (village council) with a group leader called ‘Gurikara’. The Gurikara was a hereditary leader and traditionally wore a steel or gold bangle around his wrist and a single ring on his ear, as insignia of the leadership. The role and authority of Gurikaras is diminishing with rise of democratically elected bodies. The group leader of a fishing team is called ‘Tandela’.

== Mogaveera Fishport Influence ==
Today, Malpe is recognized as one of the largest fishing harbors in Asia and is a major contributor to Karnataka's economy. The port is a bustling spectacle of activity, with hundreds of boats docked at any given time, constantly unloading fresh catches. The daily operations involve a significant workforce, with men venturing into the deep sea for fishing and women predominantly handling the segregation, weighing, and sale of the fish at the market. The Mogaveera community's history is deeply intertwined with the prosperity of Malpe. Their knowledge of the sea, their resilience, and their entrepreneurial spirit have made Malpe the vibrant fishing hub it is today. They continue to be the custodians of Malpe's maritime heritage, facing the evolving challenges of the fishing industry while preserving their unique cultural identity.

== Religion ==
The Mogaveera practice Hinduism and worshippers of tutelary deities and bhutas.", ancestral spirits and heroes who have been assimilated to the ranks of minor deities.

Butas and daivas (tutelary deities) are not worshiped on a daily basis like mainstream Hindu gods. Their worship is restricted to annual ritual festivals, though daily pujas may be conducted for the ritual objects, ornaments, and other paraphernalia of the būta. and every caste in the Tulu speaking region has its own set of butas and daivas that they worship.

Tambila, in the context of Tulunadu, is a traditional ritual offering or ceremonial feast dedicated to deities, particularly local spirits (Bhootas). It's a form of thanksgiving or vow fulfillment, often performed to seek blessings, healing, or the fulfillment of wishes.

== See also ==
- Tulu people

=== People from Mogaveera community ===
- Pramod Madhwaraj
- Yashpal Anand Suvarna
- Dr G Shankar
- Ramesh Kanchan
- Prasadraj Kanchan
- Lalaji Mendon
- Budhi Kunderan
