= Kota Brahmins =

Hindu Brahmin subcaste, mainly from Karnataka

Kota Brahmin
Regions with significant populations
- Karnataka, India

Languages
- Kota Kannada, a dialect of Kannada, Tulu, Sanskrit

Religion
- Hinduism

Related ethnic groups
- Shivalli Brahmin • Koteshwara Brahmin

Kota Brahmins are a Hindu Brahmin sub-caste mainly from the Indian state of Karnataka. Kota Brahmins take their name from their native village Kota. They speak a Kannada dialect different from the other regional dialects and Tulu. Kota Brahmins are mainly concentrated in the villages of Kota of Udupi district. The Kotas follow Smarta tradition. The Guru Narasimha Temple, Saligrama is important to them.

== See also ==
- Sthanika Brahmin
- Shivalli Brahmin
- Koteshwara Brahmin
