= Kulala =

Hindu caste from south Indian states Kerala, and Karnataka

Kulala/Moolya
Regions with significant populations
- Andhra Pradesh, Karnataka, Tamilnadu and Kerala

Languages
- Tamil, Kannada, Telugu, Tulu, Malayalam

Religion
- Hinduism

Kulala is a Hindu caste who traditionally pursued pottery trade and farming as professions. They are the descendants of Kulalan the son of Brahma and are commonly found in the Indian states of Andhra Pradesh, Karnataka, Kerala, and southern and western parts of Tamil Nadu. They belong to the Other Backward Class group.

== Etymology ==
Kulala are the descendants of the three sons of their original ancestor, Kulalan, who was the son of Brahma. Kulalan prayed to Brahma to be allowed to create and destroy things daily, so Brahma made him a potter.

== Distribution ==
Andhra Pradesh

They speak the Telugu language and are also known as Kulala, Kummara and Moolya Salivahana

Tamil Nadu

Tamil-speaking Kulalar in southern and western part of Tamil nadu they use the title Velar and Udayar

Telugu-speaking Kulala in southern Tamil Nadu use the title Chettiyar (Also known as Telugu Chettiar). They are relatively recent migrants in the southern region of Tamil Nadu.

Karnataka

In Karnataka they speak both Tulu and Kannada language and are also known as Kumbara, Moolya and Kulal, Bangera. The proper honorific suffix of their name is Setti. They trace their origin from Salivahana. There are three main endogamous groups among the Kumbaras : Telugu Kumbaras, otherwise known as Sajjana Kumbaras, Kannada Kumbaras, and Lingayat Kumbaras. The members of the third division who wear the Linga, are, for all practical purposes, Lingayats, following the rites and ceremonies peculiar to that caste, and having a Jangama as their priest.

There is little doubt that the members' of the Lingayat section are recent converts from the main community. Some, however, namely, the Sajjana section, state that they were all Lingayats originally, but lost rank by taking to drinking and flesh-eating.

The Lingayat Kumbaras are also said to have similar exogamous divisions, but like other Lingayats, those of them who live in towns, claim to consist of five gotras named after Renuka, Daruka, Gajakarna, Ghantakarna and Visvakarma.

Kerala

Kulala community (also known as Kulala Nair) is found only in the Kasaragod district of Kerala state in India, where they have several exogamous gotras, including Banjan, Banjera, Salian and Upian. They use the title "Nair". In Kasaragod district the Tulu-speaking Kulala community has another name - Moolya.

This community has completely given up their traditional occupation in Kerala.

== Culture ==
They follow both Saivism and Vaishnavism. Their rituals and ceremonies are similar to those of the Kama or Vellalar. Some have priests of their own caste, while others employ brahmins. They wear sacred thread and have claimed a higher social status.

== See also ==
- Pottery
- Kumal people
- Chettiar
- Twenty four Manai Telugu Chettiars
