= Siri (disambiguation) =

Siri is Apple's virtual assistant application.

Siri or SIRI may also refer to:

== People ==
- Siri (given name), including a list of people with the name
- Siri (surname), including a list of people with the name

== Arts and entertainment ==
=== Fictional characters ===
- Siri, the protagonist in the Epic of Siri, an epic Tulu-language poem
- Siri, in Dan Simmons's novel Hyperion
- Siri, in Brandon Sanderson's novel Warbreaker
- Siri Keeton, in Peter Watts's novel Blindsight
- Siri Tachi, in Jude Watson's series Star Wars: Jedi Apprentice
- Siri, a doll in the Groovy Girls line by Manhattan Toy
- Siri, in the 2003 film Rugrats Go Wild
- Siri, a Super-Skrull from Marvel Comics

=== Other uses in arts and entertainment ===
- Siri (play), a 2015 Indian Tulu-language drama
- "Siri" (Romeo Santos song), by Romeo Santos featuring Chris Lebron, 2022
- Siri (Thasup song), 2022
- "Siri", a song by Lil Wayne featuring 2 Chainz from the 2018 deluxe album Tha Carter V

== Places ==
- Siri Fort, one of the seven cities of Delhi, India
  - Siri Fort Auditorium
  - Siri Fort Sports Complex
- Siri Lake, Kaghan Valley, Pakistan
- Siri, a crude oil field in the Badejo Field off the coast of Brazil
- Siri Waterfall, Gaua Island, Vanuatu
- 332 Siri, a main-belt asteroid
- Sirri island, an island in the Persian gulf controlled by Iran

== Other uses ==
- Siri language, an Afro-Asiatic language
- Service Interface for Real Time Information, an XML protocol for real-time public transport information
- SiriusXM, stock symbol is SIRI

== See also ==
- Seri (disambiguation)
- Series (disambiguation)
- Siris (disambiguation)
- Sri (disambiguation)
- Siry (disambiguation)
- Sirri, Iran, a village in Abumusa County, Hormozgan province, Iran
- Sirri Island, an island in the Persian Gulf belonging to Iran, sometimes transliterated as Siri Island, or Siri
- Sirri Island Airport
- Sirri Rural District, an administrative division of Abumusa County, Hormozgan province, Iran
- SyRI, an algorithmic welfare fraud predictor
- SEERI, St. Ephrem Ecumenical Research Institute
