= Venkataraja Puninchathaya =

Indian writer and scholar (1936–2012)

- Born: 10 October 1936; Kasaragod, Kerala State
- Died: 13 September 2012 (aged 75)
- Occupation: Teacher

Academic background
- Education: Vidwan in Sanskrit (equivalent to a bachelor's degree), Postgraduate
- Alma mater: University of Mysore

Academic work
- Discipline: Scholar, linguist, artist
- Sub-discipline: Manuscriptologist, researcher, poet, playwright, actor
- Institutions: Swamiji's High School Edneer, Kasaragod Taluk; later Kerala Tulu Academy
- Main interests: Tulu Language, Yakshagana
- Website: puninchathaya.com/index.html

Pundur Venkataraja Puninchathaya (10 October 1936 – 13 September 2012), commonly known as P. V. Puninchathaya, was an Indian scholar, teacher, author and researcher of the Tulu language and literature.

== Early life and education ==
Puninchathaya was born on 10 October 1936 in Pundur, Kasaragod district (in present-day Kerala). He grew up in a Tulu-speaking community where he studied local language, oral traditions, and folklore.

He completed his schooling locally and later pursued higher education in literature and education.

== Career ==
Puninchathaya began his career as a teacher at Swamiji's High School in Edneer, Kasaragod Taluk. His research included the Tulu language, Tulu script, Sanskrit manuscripts, and folklore. His work in calligraphy included the identification and publication of Tulu poems, such as Shree Bhagavathi, Kaveri, Tulu Devi Mahatme, Tulu Mahabharatha which included the Tulu Karna Parva. Puninchathaya was the founding president of the Kerala Tulu Academy from 2008 to 2012. He was a Yakshagana artist, primarily in Arthadhari (character portrayal), and portrayed female roles in Talamaddale, a form of Yakshagana.

Alongside teaching, he worked in cultural and linguistic organizations. His research focused on the preservation of traditional knowledge, documenting oral literature, and analyzing the linguistic structures of Tulu, among other related Dravidian languages.

== Death ==
Puninchathaya died on 13 September 2012.

== Awards and recognition ==
- National Award for Teachers, 1990
- Sandesh Media Award in 1997, Kayyar Award in 1998
- Karnataka Tulu Sahitya Academy Award in 1999
- Mangalore University honorary doctorate in 2007
