= Siri (play) =

Siri is a 2015 Tulu drama directed by B. Jayashree and produced by National School of Drama (NSD), Bangalore. The drama is based on Epic of Siri, a Tulu epic poem, and a play written by Na. Damodara Shetty.

== Plot ==
The drama covers only the first part of the epic, i.e. till the death of Siri, the female protagonist of the play.

== Crew ==
The crew of the film included:

- Director, concept, costume:: B. Jayashree
- Research: Chinnappa Gowda
- Producer: National School of Drama (Bangalore)
- Music: Praveen D Rao
- Costume: Anil Naik
- Set design: Shashidhar Adapa

== Production ==
The drama is directed by B. Jayashree, a Bangalore-based theatre personality. Although she is fluent in both Kananda and Tulu, none of these languages is her mother tongue. The background music is composed by Praveen D. Rao. According to Jayashree the character of Siri is "mythical, mysterious, engaging and enchanting". Chinnappa Gowda, a folklorist did the required research works. The students of NSD, Banaglore acted in this drama.

The first staging of the drama took place on 23 July 2015, at SD City Campus, Guru Nanak Bhavan.
