= Seri =

Seri, Séri, or SERI may refer to:

== People ==
- Camille Séri (born 1999), French hurdler
- Jean Michaël Seri, an Ivorian professional footballer

== Places ==
- Seri Yek-e Zarruk, Iran
- Seri, Bheri, Nepal
- Seri, Karnali, Nepal
- Seri, Mahakali, Nepal
- Seri, Raebareli, a village in Utta Pradesh, India

== Other ==
- Seri people, an indigenous people of Mexico
- Seri language
- Samsung Economic Research Institute, a private-sector think tanks in South Korea
- Solar Energy Research Institute, now called National Renewable Energy Laboratory
- Seri, one of the bulls that carried the god Teshub in Hurrian mythology
- Seri, trapdoors used in Kabuki theatres
- Seri, or Japanese parsley
- Seri (fly), a genus of flies in the family Platypezidae
