= Siris =

Siris may refer to:

== Mythology ==
- Siris (goddess), the Mesopotamian goddess of beer
- Siris (mythology), a figure in Greek mythology; also known as Sinis

== Places ==
- Siris, Magna Graecia, an ancient city in southern Italy
- Siris, Sardinia, an Italian commune
- Sinni (river) (Latin: Siris), Italy
- Siris, Jenin, a Palestinian town
- Serres, a city in Macedonia called Siris by the Ancient Greek historian Herodotus

== People ==
- Michael Siris (born 1945), American attorney
- P. Siris (1705–1735), English dancing master and choreographer

== Other uses ==
- Albizia or Siris, plants in the legume genus, also known as silk trees
- Siris (band), an international rock group
- Smithsonian Institution Research Information System (SIRIS)
- The main character from the Infinity Blade series of games
- A 1744 treatise on natural philosophy by Irish philosopher George Berkeley

== See also ==
- Siri (disambiguation)
- Sirius (disambiguation)
