= Tigalari script =

Abugida writing system of the Brahmic family

Tulu-Tigalari script
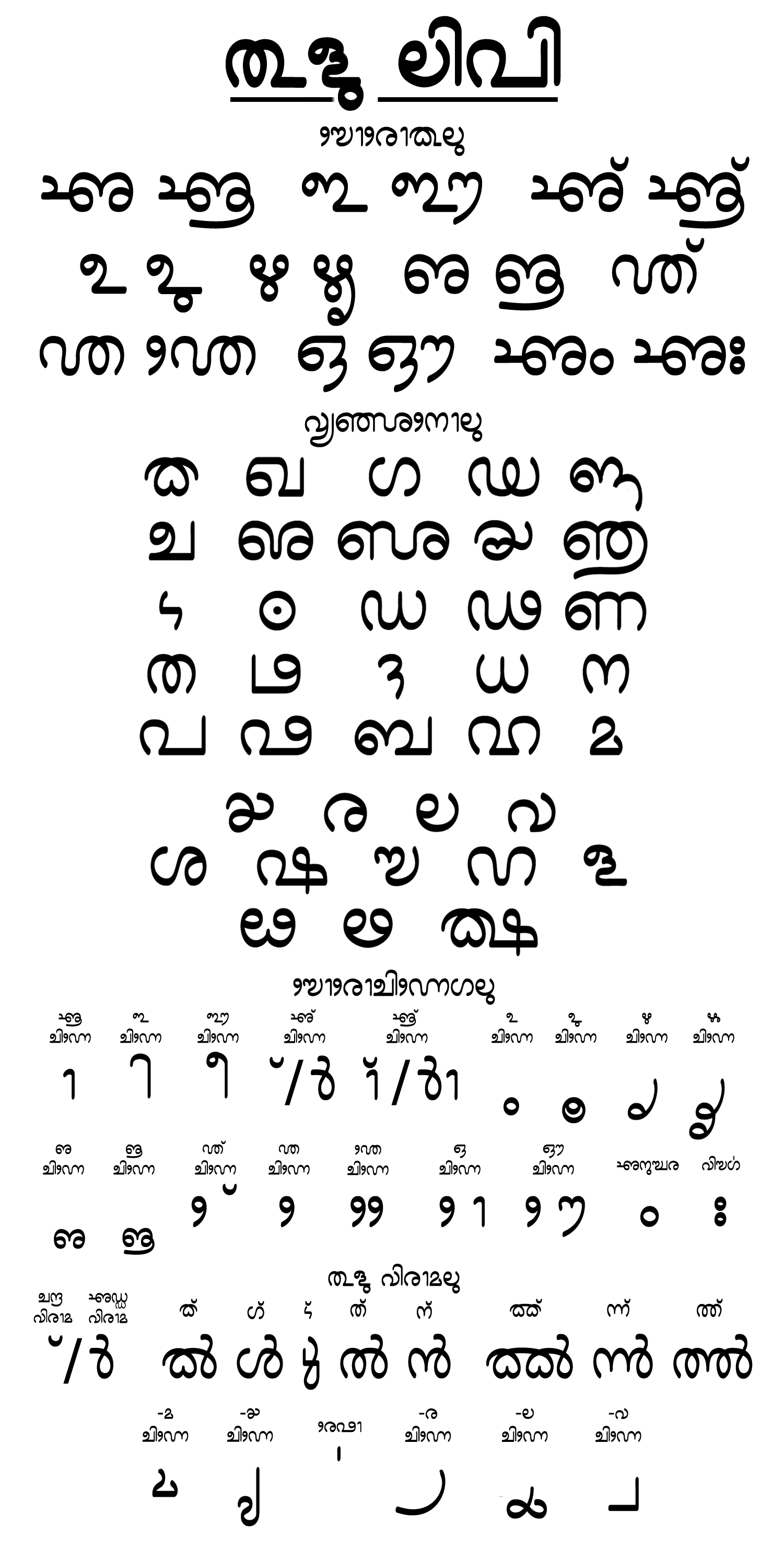
- Tulu Alphabet Chart (Tul̥u Barave)
- Script type: Abugida
- Period: c. 1250 CE – present
- Direction: Left-to-right
- Languages: Tulu; Kannada; Sanskrit

Related scripts
- Parent systems: Egyptian: Proto-Sinaitic; Phoenician; Aramaic; Brahmi script; Tamil Brahmi; Pallava script; Grantha; Tigalari-Malayalam; Tulu-Tigalari script
- Sister systems: Malayalam script; Thirke script; Saurashtra script; Dhives Akuru

ISO 15924
- ISO 15924: Tutg (341), Tulu-Tigalari

Unicode
- Unicode alias: Tulu Tigalari
- Unicode range: U+11380–U+113FF

Tulu-Tigalari Script is a Southern Brahmic script which was used to write the Tulu, Kannada, and Sanskrit languages. It was primarily used for writing Vedic texts in Sanskrit. It evolved from the Grantha script. It bears high similarity and relationship to its sister script Malayalam, which also evolved from the Grantha script.

The script was used by Tulu-speaking Brahmins like Shivalli Brahmins and Kannada speaking Havyaka Brahmins and Kota Brahmins to write Vedic mantras and other Sanskrit religious texts. However, there has been a renewed interest among Tulu speakers to revive the script as it was formerly used in the Tulu-speaking region. The Karnataka Tulu Sahitya Academy, a cultural wing of the Government of Karnataka, has introduced Tuḷu language (written in Kannada script) and Tulu-Tigalari script in schools across the Mangalore and Udupi districts. The academy provides instructional manuals to learn this script and conducts workshops to teach it.

== Names ==
Name of the script	Prevalent in	References to their roots
Arya Ezhuttu; Grantha Malayalam	Kerala, Parts of Karnataka and Tamil Nadu	Malayalam Speakers, Manipravala, Tamil Grantha
Western Grantha; Tulu-Malayalam	Few academic publications	19th Century Western Scholars
Tulu-Tigalari	Malenadu and Karavali regions of Karnataka	Kannada speakers, Havyaka Brahmins, National Manuscript Mission Catalogues
Tulu Lipi; Tulu Grantha Lipi	Coastal Karnataka, Tulu Nadu	Tulu speakers, A C Burnell

The name by which this script is referred to is closely tied with its regional, linguistic or historical roots. It would not be wrong to assign all the names mentioned above to this script.

Arya Ezhuttu, or the more recently coined term Grantha Malayalam, is used to refer to this script in Kerala. Arya Ezhuttu covers the spectrum between the older script (that is Tigalari) until it was standardised by the lead types for Malayalam script (old style) in Kerala.

Tigalari is used to this day by the Havyaka Brahmins of the Malanadu region. Tigalari is also the term that is commonly used to refer to this script in most manuscript catalogues and in several academic publications today. Gunda Jois has studied this script closely for over four decades now. According to his findings that were based on evidences found in stone inscriptions, palm leaf manuscripts and early research work done by western scholars like B. L. Rice, he finds the only name used for this script historically has been Tigalari.

It is referred to as Tigalari lipi in Kannada-speaking regions (Malnad region) and Tulu speakers call it as Tulu lipi.

This script is commonly known as the Tulu script or Tulu Grantha script in the coastal regions of Karnataka. There are several recent publications and instructional books for learning this script. It is also called the Tigalari script in—Elements of South Indian Palaeography by Rev. A C Burnell and a couple of other early publications of the Basel Mission press, Mangalore. Tulu Ramayana manuscript found in the Dharmasthala archives refers to this script as Tigalari Lipi.

== Geographical distribution ==
The script is used all over Canara and Western Hilly regions of Karnataka. Many manuscripts are also found North Canara, Udupi, South Canara, Shimoga, Chikkamagaluru and Kasaragod district of Kerala. There are innumerable manuscripts found in this region. The major language of manuscripts is Sanskrit, mainly the works of Veda, Jyotisha and other Sanskrit epics.

== History ==
According to Arthur Coke Burnell, one form of the Grantha alphabet, originally used in the Chola dynasty, was imported into the southwest coast of India in the 8th or 9th century, and then modified in course of time in this secluded area, where communication with the east coast was very limited. It later evolved into Tigalari-Malayalam script, which was used by the Malayali, Havyaka Brahmins and Tulu Brahmin people, but was originally only used to write Sanskrit. This script split into two scripts: Tigalari and Malayalam. While Malayalam script was extended and modified to write vernacular language Malayalam, the Tigalari was written for Sanskrit only. In Malabar, this writing system was termed Arya-eluttu (ആര്യ എഴുത്ത്, Ārya eḻuttŭ), meaning "Arya writing" (Sanskrit is Indo-Aryan language while Malayalam is a Dravidian language).

The oldest record of the usage of the Tigalari script is found on a stone inscription at the Sri Veeranarayana temple in Kulashekara here is in complete Tigalari script and Tulu language and belongs to the 1159 CE. The various inscriptions of Tulu from the 15th century are in the Tigalari script. Two Tulu epics named Sri Bhagavato and Kaveri from the 17th century were also written in the same script.

Basel missionary Brigel writes in 1872 that the Tulu language had "no literature in the proper sense of the word", nor a writing system. He writes that a "modification of the Malayalam alphabet" was used to write Tulu, until the Basel Mission Press introduced Kannada script for printing in 1834, after which this precedent was generally followed. Missionary Männer similarly writes in 1886 that there was no literature in Tulu, except for "some legends" written on palm-leaves in "Malayalam character". He adds that this "Malayalam alphabet" was in vogue until the Mission introduced the Kannada script for printing. The New Testament was first translated into Tulu and printed using the Kannada script in 1847. According to Vaishnavi Murthy, the introduction of Kannada printing presses contributed to the disappearance of the traditional Tulu script, as Kannada became the script used for publishing Tulu works.

== Usage ==
=== Historical use ===
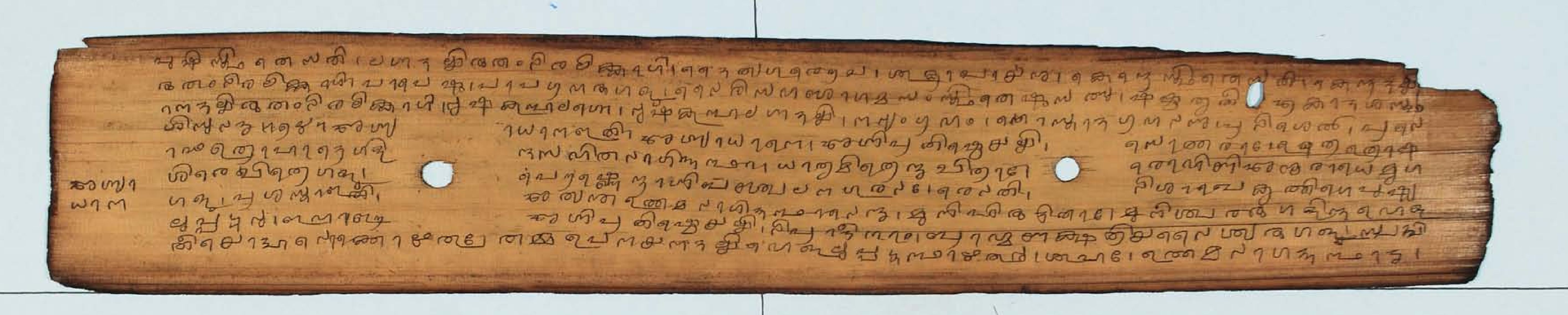
Tigalari manuscript folio in Sanskrit, Vidyamadhaviyam-Jyotisha Shastram

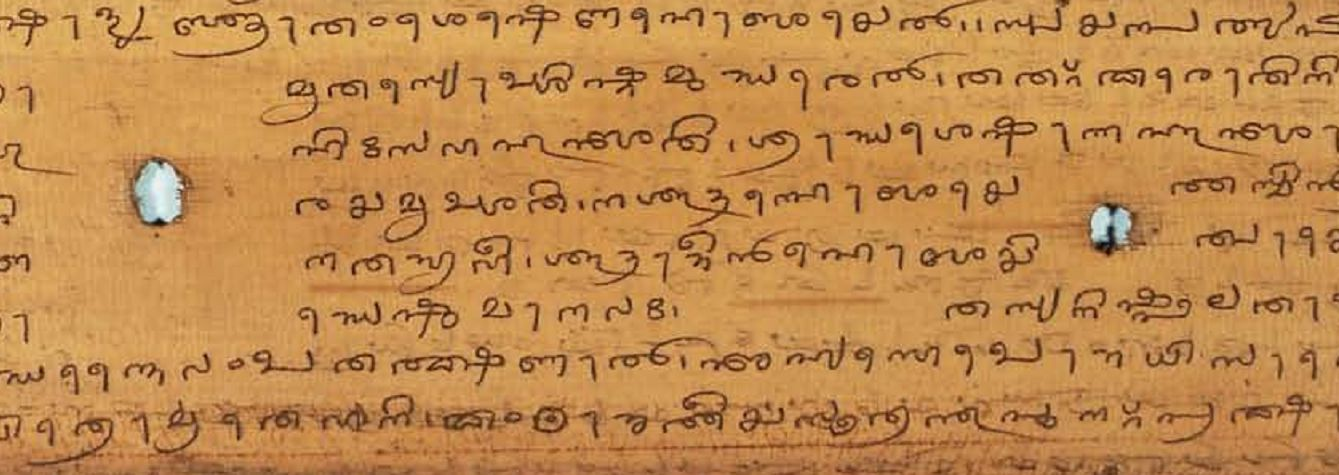
Tigalari manuscript

Thousands of manuscripts have been found in this script such as Vedas, Upanishads, Jyotisha, Dharmashastra, Purana and many more. Most works are in Sanskrit. However, some Kannada manuscripts are also found such as Gokarna Mahatmyam etc. The popular 16th-century work Kaushika Ramayana written in Old Kannada language by Battaleshwara of Yana, Uttara Kannada is found in this script. Mahabharato of 15th century written in this script in Tulu language is also found. But earlier to this several 12th-13th century Sanskrit manuscripts of Madhvacharya are also found. Honnavar in Uttara Kannada District is known for its Samaveda manuscripts. Other manuscripts like Devi Mahatmyam, from the 15th century and two epic poems written in the 17th century, namely Sri Bhagavato and Kaveri have also been found in Tulu language.

=== Modern use ===
Today the usage of the script has decreased. It is still used in parts of Kanara region and traditional maṭhas of undivided Dakshina Kannada and Uttara Kannada Districts.

The National Mission for Manuscripts has conducted several workshops on Tigalari script. Dharmasthala and the Ashta Mathas of Udupi have done significant work in preserving the script. Several studies and research work has been done on Tigalari script. Keladi houses over 400 manuscripts in Tigalari script.

There is a gaining support and interest by Tuluvas in revival of the script. Karnataka Tulu Sahitya Academy is constantly conducting meetings with experts for standardisation of Tulu script. There is also huge support from Local MLAs for popularising the Tulu script.

There are many places in Tulu Nadu region where sign boards are being installed in Tulu script.

== Preservation ==
Keladi Museum & Historical Research Bureau, Shimoga, Karnataka
The museum has a library of about a thousand paper and palm leaf manuscripts written in Kannada, Sanskrit, Tamil and Telugu, besides four hundred palm leaf manuscripts in Tigalari script. They relate to literature, art, dharmaśāstra, history, astrology, astronomy, medicine, mathematics and veterinary science. There are several collections in the museum, including art objects, arms coins, stone sculptures and copper plate inscriptions belonging to the Vijayanagara and Keladi eras. The Institution is affiliated to Gnana Sahyadri, Shankaraghatta, Kuvempu University of Shimoga.

Oriental Research Institute Mysore
The Oriental Research Institute Mysore houses over 33,000 palm leaf manuscripts. It is a research institute which collects, exhibits, edits and publishes rare manuscripts in both Sanskrit and Kannada. It contains many manuscripts, including Sharadatilaka, in Tigalari script. The Sharadatilaka is a treatise on theory and practice of Tantric worship. While the exact date of the composition is not known, the manuscript itself is thought to be about four hundred years old. The author of the text, Lakshmana Deshikendra, is said to have written the text as an aid to worship for those unable to go through voluminous Tantra texts. The composition contains the gist of major Tantra classics and is in verse form.

Saraswathi Mahal Library, Thanjavur
Built up by the Nayak and Maratha dynasties of Thanjavur, Saraswathi Mahal Library contains a very rare and valuable collection of manuscripts, books, maps and painting on all aspects of arts, culture and literature. The scripts include Grantha, Devanagari, Telugu and Malayalam, Kannada, Tamil, Tigalari and Oriya.

French Institute of Pondicherry
The French Institute of Pondicherry was established in 1955 with a view to collecting all material relating to Saiva Āgamas, scriptures of the Saiva religious tradition called the Shaiva Siddhanta, which has flourished in South India since the eighth century BCE The manuscript collection of the Institute was compiled under its Founder–Director, Jean Filliozat. The manuscripts, which are in need of urgent preservation, cover a wide variety of topics such as Vedic ritual, Saiva Agama, Sthalapurana and scripts, such as Grantha and Tamil. The collection consists of approximately 8,600 palm-leaf codices, most of which are in the Sanskrit language and written in Grantha script; others are in Tamil, Malayalam, Telugu, Nandinagari and Tigalari scripts.

The Shaiva Agama is composed in Sanskrit and written in Tigalari script. Though there may be a few copies of these texts available elsewhere, this particular codex comes from southern Karnataka, providing glimpses into the regional variations and peculiarities in ritual patterns. The manuscript was copied in the 18th century on (sritala) palm leaf manuscripts.

Apart from these they are also found in Dharmasthala, Ramachandrapura Matha of Hosanagar, Shimoga, Sonda Swarnavalli Matha of Sirsi and the Ashta Mathas of Udupi.

== Characters ==
The following charts show a complete list of the consonants, vowels and mmarks used in the Tigalari script.

=== Independent vowels ===
Character	Unicode name	IPA
𑎀	Tulu-Tigalari Letter A	[a]
𑎁	Tulu-Tigalari Letter Aa	[aː]
𑎂	Tulu-Tigalari Letter I	[i]
𑎃	Tulu-Tigalari Letter Ii	[iː]
𑎄	Tulu-Tigalari Letter U	[u]
𑎅	Tulu-Tigalari Letter Uu	[uː]
𑎆	Tulu-Tigalari Letter Vocalic R	[ru]
𑎇	Tulu-Tigalari Letter Vocalic Rr	[rɯː/rʊː]
𑎈	Tulu-Tigalari Letter Vocalic L	[luː]
𑎋	Tulu-Tigalari Letter Ee	[e]
𑎎	Tulu-Tigalari Letter Ai	[ai]
𑎐	Tulu-Tigalari Letter Oo	[o]
𑎑	Tulu-Tigalari Letter Au	[au]

=== Vowel diacritics ===
Character	Unicode name	IPA
𑎸	Tulu-Tigalari Vowel Sign Aa	[aː]
𑎹	Tulu-Tigalari Vowel Sign I	[i]
𑎺	Tulu-Tigalari Vowel Sign Ii	[iː]
𑎻	Tulu-Tigalari Vowel Sign U	[u]
𑎼	Tulu-Tigalari Vowel Sign Uu	[uː]
𑎽	Tulu-Tigalari Vowel Sign Vocalic R	[ru]
𑎾	Tulu-Tigalari Vowel Sign Vocalic Rr	[rɯː/rʊː]
𑎿	Tulu-Tigalari Vowel Sign Vocalic L	[luː]
𑏀	Tulu-Tigalari Vowel Sign Vocalic Ll	[luː]
𑏂	Tulu-Tigalari Vowel Sign Ee	[e]
𑏅	Tulu-Tigalari Vowel Sign Ai	[ai]
𑏇	Tulu-Tigalari Vowel Sign Oo	[o]
𑏈	Tulu-Tigalari Vowel Sign Au	[au]

=== Consonants ===
Character	Unicode name	IPA
𑎒	Tulu-Tigalari Letter Ka	[ka]
𑎓	Tulu-Tigalari Letter Kha	[kʰa]
𑎔	Tulu-Tigalari Letter Ga	[ga]
𑎕	Tulu-Tigalari Letter Gha	[gʰa]
𑎖	Tulu-Tigalari Letter Nga	[ŋa]
𑎗	Tulu-Tigalari Letter Ca	[t͡ʃa]
𑎘	Tulu-Tigalari Letter Cha	[t͡ʃʰa]
𑎙	Tulu-Tigalari Letter Ja	[d͡ʒa]
𑎚	Tulu-Tigalari Letter Jha	[d͡ʒʱa]
𑎛	Tulu-Tigalari Letter Nya	[ɲa]
𑎜	Tulu-Tigalari Letter Tta	[ʈa]
𑎝	Tulu-Tigalari Letter Ttha	[ʈʰa]
𑎞	Tulu-Tigalari Letter Dda	[ɖa]
𑎟	Tulu-Tigalari Letter Ddha	[ɖʱa]
𑎠	Tulu-Tigalari Letter Nna	[ɳa]
𑎡	Tulu-Tigalari Letter Ta	[ta]
𑎢	Tulu-Tigalari Letter Tha	[tʰa]
𑎣	Tulu-Tigalari Letter Da	[da]
𑎤	Tulu-Tigalari Letter Dha	[dʱa]
𑎥	Tulu-Tigalari Letter Na	[na]
𑎦	Tulu-Tigalari Letter Pa	[pa]
𑎧	Tulu-Tigalari Letter Pha	[pʰa]
𑎨	Tulu-Tigalari Letter Ba	[ba]
𑎩	Tulu-Tigalari Letter Bha	[bʱa]
𑎪	Tulu-Tigalari Letter Ma	[ma]
𑎫	Tulu-Tigalari Letter Ya	[ja]
𑎬	Tulu-Tigalari Letter Ra	[ra]
𑎭	Tulu-Tigalari Letter La	[la]
𑎮	Tulu-Tigalari Letter Va	[ʋa]
𑎯	Tulu-Tigalari Letter Sha	[ɕa]
𑎰	Tulu-Tigalari Letter Ssa	[ʂa]
𑎱	Tulu-Tigalari Letter Sa	[sa]
𑎲	Tulu-Tigalari Letter Ha	[ha]
𑎳	Tulu-Tigalari Letter Lla	[ɭa]
𑎴	Tulu-Tigalari Letter Rra	[ɻa]
𑎵	Tulu-Tigalari Letter Llla	[ɭːa]

=== Signs ===
Character	Unicode name	Function
𑎷	Tulu-Tigalari Sign Avagraha	Marks the elision or omission of a short initial vowel (a), typically in Sanskrit sandhi contexts.
𑏉	Tulu-Tigalari Au Length Mark	Used as a dependent vowel sign component to extend or represent the length of the au vowel sound.
𑏊	Tulu-Tigalari Sign Candra Anunasika	Indicates nasalization of the preceding vowel (candrabindu).
𑏌	Tulu-Tigalari Sign Anusvara	Represents a nasal modifier or pure nasal sound following a vowel (often rendered as m or ṁ).
𑏍	Tulu-Tigalari Sign Visarga	Represents a post-vocalic voiceless glottal aspirate or breathy release (typically transliterated as ḥ).
𑏎	Tulu-Tigalari Sign Virama	Suppresses the inherent vowel of a consonant sign, indicating a pure consonant or end of a syllable.
𑏏	Tulu-Tigalari Sign Looped Virama	A distinct visual or structural variant of the virama, used to suppress inherent vowels or indicate explicit conjunct structures/half-consonants.
𑏐	Tulu-Tigalari Conjoiner	Serves as a control character (similar to a joiner) to trigger stacked or ligature forms of adjacent consonants.
𑏑	Tulu-Tigalari Repha	A positional variant representing a pre-consonantal r sound in a consonant cluster.
𑏒	Tulu-Tigalari Gemination Mark	Explicitly marks double or doubled (geminated) consonants.
𑏓	Tulu-Tigalari Sign Pluta	Indicates extended or prolonged vowel length (extra-long duration, often 3 moras) in recitation or chant.
𑏡	Tulu-Tigalari Vedic Tone Svarita	Marks the svarita (falling/circumflex) Vedic pitch accent above or alongside a syllable.
𑏢	Tulu-Tigalari Vedic Tone Anudatta	Marks the anudatta (low/grave) Vedic pitch accent below or alongside a syllable.

=== Punctuation ===
Character	Unicode name	Function
𑏔	Tulu-Tigalari Danda	Sentence or verse delimiter
𑏕	Tulu-Tigalari Double Danda	Double sentence or verse delimiter
𑏗	Tulu-Tigalari Sign Om Pushpika	Ornamental/religious punctuation
𑏘	Tulu-Tigalari Sign Shrii Pushpika	Ornamental/religious punctuation

=== Comparison with other scripts ===
Tigalari and Malayalam are both descended from Grantha script, and resemble each other both in their individual letters and in using consonant conjuncts less than other Indic scripts. It is assumed that a single script around 9th-10th century called Western Grantha, evolved from Grantha script and later divided into two scripts.

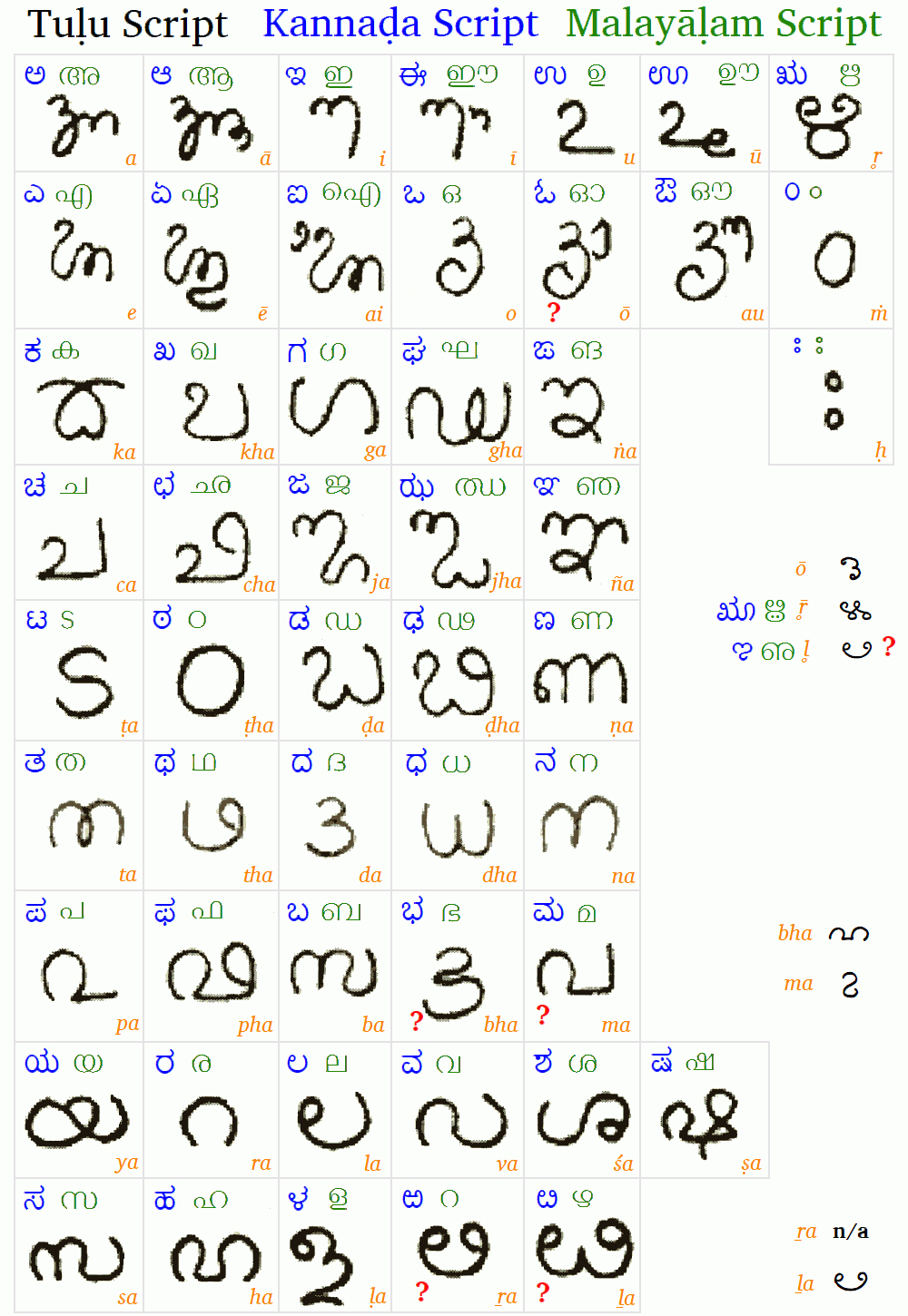

The following table compares the Tigalari consonants with other Southern Indic scripts such as Grantha, Malayalam, Kannada and Sinhala.

South Indian Script Consonants
I.P.A.	/k/	/kʱ/	/g/	/gʱ/	/ŋ/	/t͡ʃ/	/t͡ʃʱ/	/d͡ʒ/	/d͡ʒʱ/	/ɲ/	/ʈ/	/ʈʱ/	/ɖ/	/ɖʱ/	/ɳ/	/t̪/	/t̪ʱ/	/d̪/	/d̪ʱ/	/n̪/	/n/	t	/t͡s/	/d͡z/	/p/	/pʱ/	/b/	bʱ	/m/	/j/	y	ɾ	/ɽ/	/r/	/l/	/ɭ/	/ɻ/	/ʋ/	/ʃ/	/ʂ/	/s/	/h/	/kʂ/	/d͡ʒɲ/
Tamil Brahmi	𑀓	𑀔	𑀕	𑀖	𑀗	𑀘	𑀙	𑀚	𑀛	𑀜	𑀝	𑀞	𑀟	𑀠	𑀡	𑀢	𑀣	𑀤	𑀥	𑀦	𑀷				𑀧	𑀨	𑀩	𑀪	𑀫	𑀬		𑀭		𑀶	𑀮	𑁵	𑀵	𑀯	𑀰	𑀱	𑀲	𑀳	𑀓𑁰𑀱	𑀚𑁰𑀜
Tamil	க				ங	ச		ஜ		ஞ	ட				ண	த				ந	ன				ப				ம	ய		ர		ற	ல	ள	ழ	வ	ஶ	ஷ	ஸ	ஹ	க்ஷ	
Grantha	𑌕	𑌖	𑌗	𑌘	𑌙	𑌚	𑌛	𑌜	𑌝	𑌞	𑌟	𑌠	𑌡	𑌢	𑌣	𑌤	𑌥	𑌦	𑌧	𑌨					𑌪	𑌫	𑌬	𑌭	𑌮	𑌯		𑌰			𑌲	𑌳		𑌵	𑌶	𑌷	𑌸	𑌹	𑌕𑍍𑌷	𑌜𑍍𑌞
Tigalari	𑎒	𑎓	𑎔	𑎕	𑎖	𑎗	𑎘	𑎙	𑎚	𑎛	𑎜	𑎝	𑎞	𑎟	𑎠	𑎡	𑎢	𑎣	𑎤	𑎥					𑎦	𑎧	𑎨	𑎩	𑎪	𑎫		𑎬		𑎴	𑎭	𑎳	𑎵	𑎮	𑎯	𑎰	𑎱	𑎲	𑎒𑏐𑎰	𑎙𑏐𑎛
Malayalam	ക	ഖ	ഗ	ഘ	ങ	ച	ഛ	ജ	ഝ	ഞ	ട	ഠ	ഡ	ഢ	ണ	ത	ഥ	ദ	ധ	ന	ഩ	ഺ			പ	ഫ	ബ	ഭ	മ	യ		ര		റ	ല	ള	ഴ	വ	ശ	ഷ	സ	ഹ	ക്ഷ	ജ്ഞ
Kannada	ಕ	ಖ	ಗ	ಘ	ಙ	ಚ	ಛ	ಜ	ಝ	ಞ	ಟ	ಠ	ಡ	ಢ	ಣ	ತ	ಥ	ದ	ಧ	ನ	ನ಼				ಪ	ಫ	ಬ	ಭ	ಮ	ಯ	ಯ಼	ರ		ಱ	ಲ	ಳ	ೞ	ವ	ಶ	ಷ	ಸ	ಹ	ಕ್ಷ	ಜ್ಞ
Telugu	క	ఖ	గ	ఘ	ఙ	చ	ఛ	జ	ఝ	ఞ	ట	ఠ	డ	ఢ	ణ	త	థ	ద	ధ	న	ౝ		ౘ	ౙ	ప	ఫ	బ	భ	మ	య	య఼	ర	ౚ	ఱ	ల	ళ	ఴ	వ	శ	ష	స	హ	క్ష	జ్ఞ
Sinhala	ක	ඛ	ග	ඝ	ඞ	ච	ඡ	ජ	ඣ	ඤ	ට	ඨ	ඩ	ඪ	ණ	ත	ථ	ද	ධ	න					ප	ඵ	බ	භ	ම	ය		ර			ල	ළ		ව	ශ	ෂ	ස	හ	ක්‍ෂ	ඥ

Notes:

Letters used in the modern script
Letters rarely used in the modern script
Archaic letters not used in the modern script

== Sample Text ==
The following text is Article 1 of the Universal Declaration of Human Rights, written in Tulu::

Tigalari script

𑎪𑎸𑎡 𑎥𑎬𑎪𑎸𑎥𑎹𑎭𑎻 𑎱𑏐𑎮𑎮𑎥𑏐𑎡𑏐𑎬𑎮𑎸𑎣𑏎 𑎨𑏇𑎒𑏐𑎒 𑎔𑏈𑎬𑎮𑏇𑎞𑎻 𑎨𑏇𑎒𑏐𑎒 𑎲𑎒𑏐𑎒𑎻𑎭𑏂𑎞𑏎 𑎱𑎪𑎸𑎥𑎮𑎸𑎣𑏎 𑎦𑎻𑎜𑏐𑎜𑎻𑎮𑏂𑎬𑏏. 𑎀𑎒𑎻𑎭𑎻 𑎡𑎬𑏏𑎒 𑎨𑏇𑎒𑏐𑎒 𑎁𑎡𑏐𑎪𑎱𑎸𑎒𑏐𑎰𑎹𑎞𑏎 𑎦𑎻𑎔𑎬𑏏𑎡𑏂 𑎦𑎞𑏂𑎫𑎹𑎥𑎒𑎻𑎭𑎻 𑎨𑏇𑎒𑏐𑎒 𑎐𑎬𑎹 𑎐𑎬𑎹 𑎱𑏇𑎣𑎬𑎡𑏐𑎮𑎣 𑎩𑎸𑎮𑏇𑎞𑎻 𑎮𑎬𑏏𑎡𑎥𑏂 𑎪𑎭𑏏𑎦𑏇𑎞𑎻.

Malayalam script

മാതാ നരമാനിലു സ്വതന്ത്രവാദ് ബൊക്ക ഗൗരവൊഡു ബൊക്ക ഹക്കുലെഡ് സമാനവാദ് പുട്ടുവെർ. അകുലു തർക ബൊക്ക ആത്മസാക്ഷിഡ് പുഗർതെ പഡെയിനകുലു ബൊക്ക ഒരി ഒരി സോദരത്വദ ഭാവൊഡു വർതനെ മല്പൊഡു.

Kannada script

ಮಾತಾ ನರಮಾನಿಲು ಸ್ವತಂತ್ರವಾದ್ ಬೊಕ್ಕ ಗೌರವೊಡು ಬೊಕ್ಕ ಹಕ್ಕುಲೆಡ್ ಸಮಾನವಾದ್ ಪುಟ್ಟುವೆರ್. ಅಕುಲು ತರ್ಕ ಬೊಕ್ಕ ಆತ್ಮಸಾಕ್ಷಿಡ್ ಪುಗರ್ತೆ ಪಡೆಯಿನಕುಲು ಬೊಕ್ಕ ಒರಿ ಒರಿ ಸೋದರತ್ವದ ಭಾವೊಡು ವರ್ತನೆ ಮಲ್ಪೊಡು.

Romanisation

Mātā naramānilŭ svatantravādŭ bokka gauravoḍu bokka hakkuleḍŭ samānavādŭ puṭṭuver. Akulu tarka bokka ātmasākṣiḍ pugarte paḍeyinakulu bokka ori ori sōdaratvad bhāvoḍu vartane malpoḍu.

Translation

Article 1: All human beings are born free and equal in dignity and rights. They are endowed with reason and conscience and should act towards one another in a spirit of brotherhood.

== Unicode ==
The Tigalari script was added to the Unicode Standard in September 2024 with the release of version 16.0. The Unicode block for Tigalari, named Tulu-Tigalari, is located at U+11380–U+113FF:

Tulu-Tigalari^{[1]}^{[2]} Official Unicode Consortium code chart (PDF)
	0	1	2	3	4	5	6	7	8	9	A	B	C	D	E	F
U+1138x	𑎀	𑎁	𑎂	𑎃	𑎄	𑎅	𑎆	𑎇	𑎈	𑎉		𑎋			𑎎	
U+1139x	𑎐	𑎑	𑎒	𑎓	𑎔	𑎕	𑎖	𑎗	𑎘	𑎙	𑎚	𑎛	𑎜	𑎝	𑎞	𑎟
U+113Ax	𑎠	𑎡	𑎢	𑎣	𑎤	𑎥	𑎦	𑎧	𑎨	𑎩	𑎪	𑎫	𑎬	𑎭	𑎮	𑎯
U+113Bx	𑎰	𑎱	𑎲	𑎳	𑎴	𑎵		𑎷	𑎸	𑎹	𑎺	𑎻	𑎼	𑎽	𑎾	𑎿
U+113Cx	𑏀		𑏂			𑏅		𑏇	𑏈	𑏉	𑏊		𑏌	𑏍	𑏎	𑏏
U+113Dx	𑏐	𑏑	𑏒	𑏓	𑏔	𑏕		𑏗	𑏘							
U+113Ex		𑏡	𑏢													
U+113Fx																
Notes 1.As of Unicode version 18.0 2.Grey areas indicate non-assigned code points

== See also ==
- Grantha script
- Malayalam script
- Tulu Nadu
