= M. K. Seetharam Kulal =

Indian Tulu-Kannada dramatist (1940–2019)

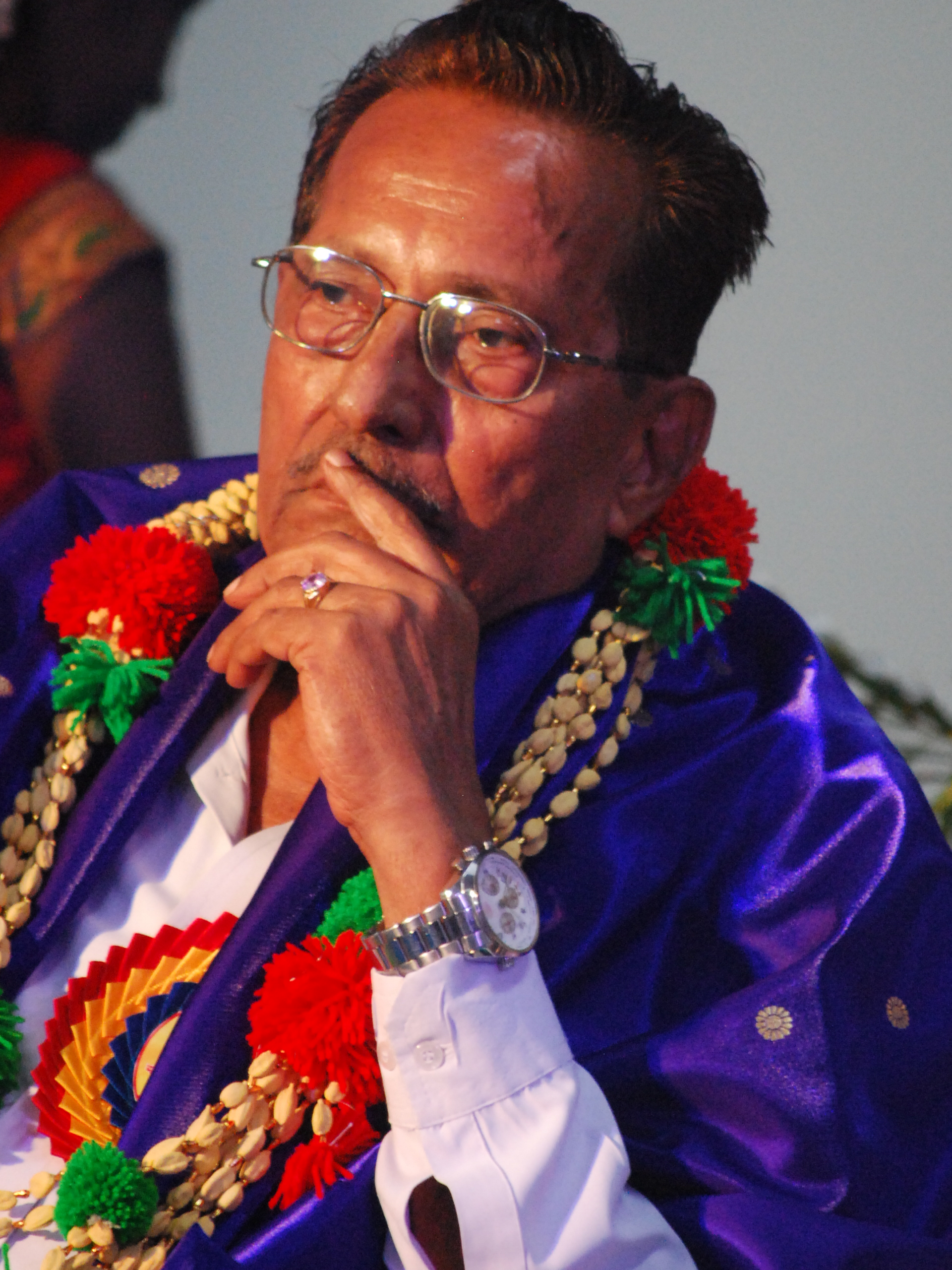
- Born: 1940
- Died: 28 July 2019 (aged 79); Mangalore
- Occupations: Poet, author

M. K. Seetharam Kulal (1940 – 28 July 2019) was an Indian Tulu-Kannada dramatist known for his work in the field of Tulu-Kannada dramas and also in the Tulu film world. He has given several skit performances at Sri Sharav Maha Ganapathi Temple, Mangalore.

== Career and awards ==
Kulal received the "Ranga Kala Bhooshana" award at a function held in the Town Hall of Mangalore in 2001. He became the President of Karnataka Tulu Sahitya Academy in 2005, succeeding Dr. Vaman Nandavar. Kulal has written the Tulu-language books Mannda Magal Abbakka (Queen Abbakka: Daughter of the Soil) and Darmogu Darmada Saval, which were published in 2007. In 2015, Karnataka Tulu Sahitya Academy honored Kulal with a Tulu Academy Award for his work in Tulu theatre. He has written popular Mokeda Singari song of a Tulu film.
