= Kodavoor =

Kodavoor Kodavooru
- town
- Location in Karnataka, India
- Coordinates: 13.35705°N 74.715480°E
- Country: India
- State: Karnataka
- District: Udupi
- Elevation: 8.83 m (29.0 ft)

Languages
  - Official: Kannada
- Time zone: UTC+5:30 (IST)
- PIN: 576106
- Telephone code: 0820
- Vehicle registration: KA-20

Kodavooru is a small town belonging to the temple city of Udupi in Karnataka, India. Home to Lord Shankaranarayana Temple and many other small sacred Hindu temples, it has a long history of its own.

== Nature and landscape ==
Being a typical coastal town, it is surrounded by coconut trees and paddy fields which contribute to its fine appearance during the monsoon.

== Tourism ==
- Kodavooru is a kilometer away from Malpe, a Karnataka coastal tourist delight, with a beautiful beach and St. Mary's Island.
- Temples in Belkale, Keremata, Kambalakatte, Mandechavadi and Kanangi Mutt.

== Culture ==
- Yakshagana is a popular form of musical dramatic art which is enjoyed here. Kodavooru is home to many prominent yakshagana artists.
- PiliNaliké/Hulivesha kunitha, when performers paint their bodies with tiger stripes and dance to popular Sandalwood Kannada tunes, is one of the most exciting moments one can experience during the days of Krishna Janmaashtami, (the Birthday Of Lord Krishna)
- Kodavooru is also a very significant place for believers of Dvaita, the system of philosophy founded by Shree Madhvacharya. According to a traditional story, Shree Madhva visited Kodavooru to pray to Lord Shankaranarayana when he was just three years old.

== Important events ==
- The annual car festival of Lord Shankaranarayana. (It is performed for 9 days and consists of the Rathotsava i.e. the Chariot seve, Pooje furformed under different Ashwatha Trees in different places of the village of Kattepooje. This is the only time Lord Shankaranarayana is brought out of the temple to the devotee's house. The Lord is carried in the Silver Pallakki and is taken to the devotee's home.)
- Lakshadeepothsava (This is the pooje in which the temple as well as the temple street is filled with the Deepa.)
- This temple is also dedicated to the god like Ganapathi. (There are two Ganapathis, one inside the temple and one near the river which flows behind the temple, popularly known as "Tudekatte ganapathi" in Tulu, Durgamata, Lord shiva, Raghavendra mata, Nagabana, Brahmadeva, Nandi. A unique feature of this temple town of Udupi is that all the temples have only one nandi. Kodavooru temple is the only temple which has two nandis. So, beside the car festival of Lord Shankaranarayana, all the Festivals such as Ganesha Chauti (Gana homa's), Navaratri (especially Cahndika homa's) are performed here.
- Maari pooje, which occurs more than twelve times in a year out of that Big Maari Pooje occurs twice a year, is also an interesting ritual which attracts a large number of devotees around the town.

== Language ==
- Tulu is the most widely spoken languages along with Kannada.

== Industry ==
Being a small town, it depends on agriculture as the main source of income. A considerable number of people here also rely on the fisheries which are supplied by the fishing harbour at the nearby town of Malpe. Beedi (a type of cigarette) Industries and Milk Producers Unions contribute a considerable degree of industry to the city.

== Transportation ==
Kodavooru has reliable public transportation with buses connecting from places like Garadimajalu, Santhekatte to Udupi and Malpe.

== Banking and finance ==
Canara Bank - Kodavooru Branch and Kodavooru Vyavasaya Seva Sahakari Sangha (a co-operative) bank operate here.

== Schools and colleges ==
While Kodavooru does have a primary school, residents have to depend on nearby Malpe, Udupi or Kallianpur for higher education.
