= Tulu-Tigalari (Unicode block) =

- Range: U+11380..U+113FF (128 code points)
- Plane: SMP
- Scripts: Tulu Tigalari
- Assigned: 80 code points
- Unused: 48 reserved code points

Unicode Version History
- 16.0 (2024): 80 (+80)

Unicode documentation
- Code chart ∣ Web page

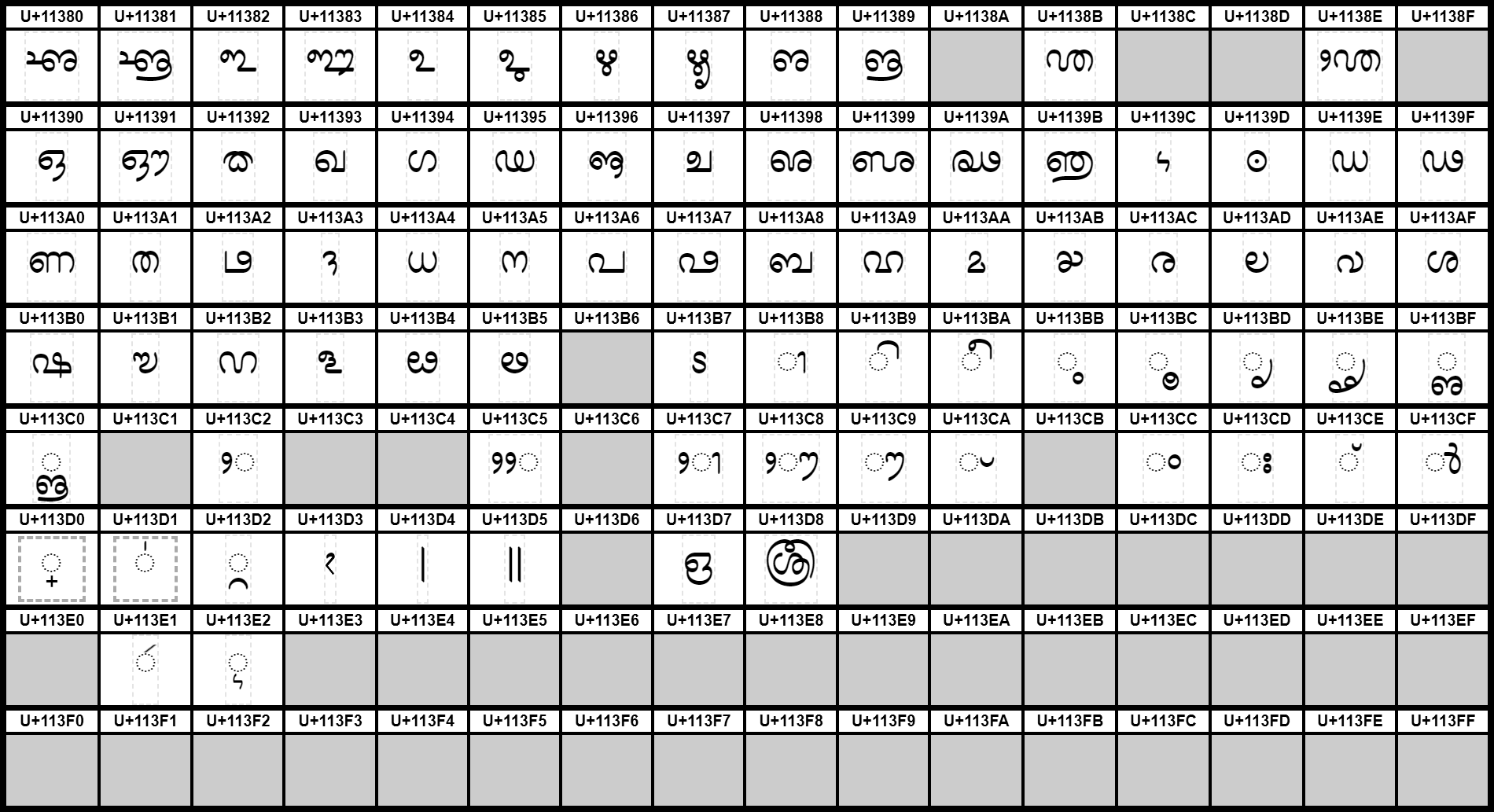
Graphical representation of the Tulu-Tigalari Unicode block.

Tulu-Tigalari is a Unicode block containing archaic characters of the Tigalari script previously used to write Tulu, Kannada, and Sanskrit languages.

Tulu-Tigalari^{[1]}^{[2]} Official Unicode Consortium code chart (PDF)
	0	1	2	3	4	5	6	7	8	9	A	B	C	D	E	F
U+1138x	𑎀	𑎁	𑎂	𑎃	𑎄	𑎅	𑎆	𑎇	𑎈	𑎉		𑎋			𑎎	
U+1139x	𑎐	𑎑	𑎒	𑎓	𑎔	𑎕	𑎖	𑎗	𑎘	𑎙	𑎚	𑎛	𑎜	𑎝	𑎞	𑎟
U+113Ax	𑎠	𑎡	𑎢	𑎣	𑎤	𑎥	𑎦	𑎧	𑎨	𑎩	𑎪	𑎫	𑎬	𑎭	𑎮	𑎯
U+113Bx	𑎰	𑎱	𑎲	𑎳	𑎴	𑎵		𑎷	𑎸	𑎹	𑎺	𑎻	𑎼	𑎽	𑎾	𑎿
U+113Cx	𑏀		𑏂			𑏅		𑏇	𑏈	𑏉	𑏊		𑏌	𑏍	𑏎	𑏏
U+113Dx	𑏐	𑏑	𑏒	𑏓	𑏔	𑏕		𑏗	𑏘							
U+113Ex		𑏡	𑏢													
U+113Fx																
Notes 1.As of Unicode version 17.0 2.Grey areas indicate non-assigned code points

== History ==
The following Unicode-related documents record the purpose and process of defining specific characters in the Tulu-Tigalari block:

Version	Final code points (Note: Proposed code points and characters names may differ from final code points and names)	Count	L2 ID	WG2 ID	Document
16.0	U+11380..11389, 1138B, 1138E, 11390..113B5, 113B7..113C0, 113C2, 113C5, 113C7..113CA, 113CC..113D5, 113D7..113D8, 113E1..113E2	80	L2/11-120R	N4025R	Everson, Michael (2011-04-22), Preliminary proposal for encoding the Tulu script in the SMP of the UCS
16.0	U+11380..11389, 1138B, 1138E, 11390..113B5, 113B7..113C0, 113C2, 113C5, 113C7..113CA, 113CC..113D5, 113D7..113D8, 113E1..113E2	80	L2/11-139		Anderson, Deborah; McGowan, Rick; Whistler, Ken (2011-04-27), "6. Tulu", Review of Indic-related L2 documents and Recommendations to the UTC
16.0	U+11380..11389, 1138B, 1138E, 11390..113B5, 113B7..113C0, 113C2, 113C5, 113C7..113CA, 113CC..113D5, 113D7..113D8, 113E1..113E2	80	L2/16-241		Yerkadithaya, Vaishnavi Murthy Kodipady (2016-08-18), Preliminary proposal to encode Tigalari script
16.0	U+11380..11389, 1138B, 1138E, 11390..113B5, 113B7..113C0, 113C2, 113C5, 113C7..113CA, 113CC..113D5, 113D7..113D8, 113E1..113E2	80	L2/16-342		Anderson, Deborah; Whistler, Ken; Pournader, Roozbeh; Glass, Andrew; Iancu, Laurențiu (2016-11-07), "2. Tigalari (Tulu)", Recommendations to UTC #149 November 2016 on Script Proposals
16.0	U+11380..11389, 1138B, 1138E, 11390..113B5, 113B7..113C0, 113C2, 113C5, 113C7..113CA, 113CC..113D5, 113D7..113D8, 113E1..113E2	80	L2/17-182		A, Srinidhi; A, Sridatta (2017-05-26), Comments on encoding the Tigalari script
16.0	U+11380..11389, 1138B, 1138E, 11390..113B5, 113B7..113C0, 113C2, 113C5, 113C7..113CA, 113CC..113D5, 113D7..113D8, 113E1..113E2	80	L2/17-378		Yerkadithaya, Vaishnavi Murthy Kodipady; Rajan, Vinodh (2017-10-20), Preliminary proposal to encode Tigalari script
16.0	U+11380..11389, 1138B, 1138E, 11390..113B5, 113B7..113C0, 113C2, 113C5, 113C7..113CA, 113CC..113D5, 113D7..113D8, 113E1..113E2	80	L2/17-422		Nagasampige, A. V. (2017-11-09), Letter to Vaishnavi Murthy in support of Tigalari encoding proposal
16.0	U+11380..11389, 1138B, 1138E, 11390..113B5, 113B7..113C0, 113C2, 113C5, 113C7..113CA, 113CC..113D5, 113D7..113D8, 113E1..113E2	80	L2/18-039		Anderson, Deborah; Whistler, Ken; Pournader, Roozbeh; Moore, Lisa; Liang, Hai; Cook, Richard (2018-01-19), "19. Tigalari", Recommendations to UTC #154 January 2018 on Script Proposals
16.0	U+11380..11389, 1138B, 1138E, 11390..113B5, 113B7..113C0, 113C2, 113C5, 113C7..113CA, 113CC..113D5, 113D7..113D8, 113E1..113E2	80	L2/18-168		Anderson, Deborah; Whistler, Ken; Pournader, Roozbeh; Moore, Lisa; Liang, Hai; Chapman, Chris; Cook, Richard (2018-04-28), "34. Tigalari", Recommendations to UTC #155 April-May 2018 on Script Proposals
16.0	U+11380..11389, 1138B, 1138E, 11390..113B5, 113B7..113C0, 113C2, 113C5, 113C7..113CA, 113CC..113D5, 113D7..113D8, 113E1..113E2	80	L2/18-175		Yerkadithaya, Vaishnavi Murthy Kodipady (2018-05-03), Replies to Script Ad Hoc Recommendations and Comments on Tigalari Proposal
16.0	U+11380..11389, 1138B, 1138E, 11390..113B5, 113B7..113C0, 113C2, 113C5, 113C7..113CA, 113CC..113D5, 113D7..113D8, 113E1..113E2	80	L2/18-232		Anderson, Deborah (2018-07-17), Feedback on pushpika
16.0	U+11380..11389, 1138B, 1138E, 11390..113B5, 113B7..113C0, 113C2, 113C5, 113C7..113CA, 113CC..113D5, 113D7..113D8, 113E1..113E2	80	L2/18-241		Anderson, Deborah; et al. (2018-07-20), "13. Tigalari", Recommendations to UTC # 156 July 2018 on Script Proposals
16.0	U+11380..11389, 1138B, 1138E, 11390..113B5, 113B7..113C0, 113C2, 113C5, 113C7..113CA, 113CC..113D5, 113D7..113D8, 113E1..113E2	80	L2/20-177		Pavanaja, U. B. (2020-06-19), Tulu Unicode Minutes and Charts
16.0	U+11380..11389, 1138B, 1138E, 11390..113B5, 113B7..113C0, 113C2, 113C5, 113C7..113CA, 113CC..113D5, 113D7..113D8, 113E1..113E2	80	L2/20-169		Anderson, Deborah; Whistler, Ken; Pournader, Roozbeh; Moore, Lisa; Constable, Peter; Liang, Hai (2020-07-21), "18. Tulu (Tigalari)", Recommendations to UTC #164 July 2020 on Script Proposals
16.0	U+11380..11389, 1138B, 1138E, 11390..113B5, 113B7..113C0, 113C2, 113C5, 113C7..113CA, 113CC..113D5, 113D7..113D8, 113E1..113E2	80	L2/21-007		Prasad, Guru (2020-10-22), Letter of Support for Tulu
16.0	U+11380..11389, 1138B, 1138E, 11390..113B5, 113B7..113C0, 113C2, 113C5, 113C7..113CA, 113CC..113D5, 113D7..113D8, 113E1..113E2	80	L2/20-279		Kučera, Jan (2020-10-25), Comments on differences between Tulu and Tigalari proposals
16.0	U+11380..11389, 1138B, 1138E, 11390..113B5, 113B7..113C0, 113C2, 113C5, 113C7..113CA, 113CC..113D5, 113D7..113D8, 113E1..113E2	80	L2/21-016R		Anderson, Deborah; Whistler, Ken; Pournader, Roozbeh; Moore, Lisa; Liang, Hai (2021-01-14), "16 Tulu", Recommendations to UTC #166 January 2021 on Script Proposals
16.0	U+11380..11389, 1138B, 1138E, 11390..113B5, 113B7..113C0, 113C2, 113C5, 113C7..113CA, 113CC..113D5, 113D7..113D8, 113E1..113E2	80	L2/21-086		Yerkadithaya, Vaishnavi Murthy Kodipady; Rajan, Vinodh (2021-04-03), Updated proposal to encode Tulu-Tigalari script in Unicode
16.0	U+11380..11389, 1138B, 1138E, 11390..113B5, 113B7..113C0, 113C2, 113C5, 113C7..113CA, 113CC..113D5, 113D7..113D8, 113E1..113E2	80	L2/21-092		Rajan, Vinodh; Liang, Hai; A, Srinidhi; A, Sridatta; Yerkadithaya, Vaishnavi Murthy Kodipady (2021-04-22), Proposal to postpone encoding of the new Tulu script from the Karnataka Tulu Sahitya Academy
16.0	U+11380..11389, 1138B, 1138E, 11390..113B5, 113B7..113C0, 113C2, 113C5, 113C7..113CA, 113CC..113D5, 113D7..113D8, 113E1..113E2	80	L2/21-073		Anderson, Deborah; Whistler, Ken; Pournader, Roozbeh; Moore, Lisa; Liang, Hai (2021-04-23), "9 Tulu/Tigalari", Recommendations to UTC #167 April 2021 on Script Proposals
16.0	U+11380..11389, 1138B, 1138E, 11390..113B5, 113B7..113C0, 113C2, 113C5, 113C7..113CA, 113CC..113D5, 113D7..113D8, 113E1..113E2	80	L2/21-188		Jain, Akash Raj (2021-05-23), Tulu documents
16.0	U+11380..11389, 1138B, 1138E, 11390..113B5, 113B7..113C0, 113C2, 113C5, 113C7..113CA, 113CC..113D5, 113D7..113D8, 113E1..113E2	80	L2/21-213		Jain, Akash Raj; et al. (2021-05-23), Karnataka Tulu Academy - Unicode Reply
16.0	U+11380..11389, 1138B, 1138E, 11390..113B5, 113B7..113C0, 113C2, 113C5, 113C7..113CA, 113CC..113D5, 113D7..113D8, 113E1..113E2	80	L2/21-146		Yerkadithaya, Vaishnavi Murthy Kodipady; Rajan, Vinodh (2021-07-14), Updated proposal to encode Tulu-Tigalari script
16.0	U+11380..11389, 1138B, 1138E, 11390..113B5, 113B7..113C0, 113C2, 113C5, 113C7..113CA, 113CC..113D5, 113D7..113D8, 113E1..113E2	80	L2/21-130		Anderson, Deborah; Whistler, Ken; Pournader, Roozbeh; Liang, Hai (2021-07-26), "13 Tulu/Tigalari", Recommendations to UTC #168 July 2021 on Script Proposals
16.0	U+11380..11389, 1138B, 1138E, 11390..113B5, 113B7..113C0, 113C2, 113C5, 113C7..113CA, 113CC..113D5, 113D7..113D8, 113E1..113E2	80	L2/21-147		Yerkadithaya, Vaishnavi Murthy Kodipady; Rajan, Vinodh (2021-07-26), "11 Tulu / Tulu-Tigalari", Replies to Tulu-Tigalari Issues
16.0	U+11380..11389, 1138B, 1138E, 11390..113B5, 113B7..113C0, 113C2, 113C5, 113C7..113CA, 113CC..113D5, 113D7..113D8, 113E1..113E2	80	L2/21-211		Yerkadithaya, Vaishnavi Murthy Kodipady (2021-08-08), A list of common Tulu-Tigalari conjuncts
16.0	U+11380..11389, 1138B, 1138E, 11390..113B5, 113B7..113C0, 113C2, 113C5, 113C7..113CA, 113CC..113D5, 113D7..113D8, 113E1..113E2	80	L2/21-210		Yerkadithaya, Vaishnavi Murthy Kodipady; Rajan, Vinodh (2021-08-13), Updated proposal to encode Tulu-Tigalari script in Unicode
16.0	U+11380..11389, 1138B, 1138E, 11390..113B5, 113B7..113C0, 113C2, 113C5, 113C7..113CA, 113CC..113D5, 113D7..113D8, 113E1..113E2	80	L2/21-212		Yerkadithaya, Vaishnavi Murthy Kodipady (2021-08-18), Two letters of support for the Tulu-Tigalari
16.0	U+11380..11389, 1138B, 1138E, 11390..113B5, 113B7..113C0, 113C2, 113C5, 113C7..113CA, 113CC..113D5, 113D7..113D8, 113E1..113E2	80	L2/21-189		Bellur, Radhakrishna; Ramakunja, Nischith (2021-09-23), Tulu Lipi Parchaya (translation)
16.0	U+11380..11389, 1138B, 1138E, 11390..113B5, 113B7..113C0, 113C2, 113C5, 113C7..113CA, 113CC..113D5, 113D7..113D8, 113E1..113E2	80	L2/21-220		Yerkadithaya, Vaishnavi Murthy Kodipady (2021-09-27), Comments on L2/21-213 Karnataka Tulu Academy - Unicode Reply
16.0	U+11380..11389, 1138B, 1138E, 11390..113B5, 113B7..113C0, 113C2, 113C5, 113C7..113CA, 113CC..113D5, 113D7..113D8, 113E1..113E2	80	L2/21-174		Anderson, Deborah; Whistler, Ken; Pournader, Roozbeh; Liang, Hai (2021-10-01), "11 Tulu / Tulu-Tigalari", Recommendations to UTC #169 October 2021 on Script Proposals
16.0	U+11380..11389, 1138B, 1138E, 11390..113B5, 113B7..113C0, 113C2, 113C5, 113C7..113CA, 113CC..113D5, 113D7..113D8, 113E1..113E2	80	L2/22-032		Yerkadithaya, Vaishnavi Murthy Kodipady; Rajan, Vinodh (2022-01-04), Further Response to Tulu Academy Documents
16.0	U+11380..11389, 1138B, 1138E, 11390..113B5, 113B7..113C0, 113C2, 113C5, 113C7..113CA, 113CC..113D5, 113D7..113D8, 113E1..113E2	80	L2/22-031		Yerkadithaya, Vaishnavi Murthy Kodipady; Rajan, Vinodh (2022-01-18), Updated proposal to encode the Tulu-Tigalari script in Unicode
16.0	U+11380..11389, 1138B, 1138E, 11390..113B5, 113B7..113C0, 113C2, 113C5, 113C7..113CA, 113CC..113D5, 113D7..113D8, 113E1..113E2	80	L2/22-023		Anderson, Deborah; Whistler, Ken; Pournader, Roozbeh; Constable, Peter (2022-01-22), "7 Tulu-Tigalari", Recommendations to UTC #170 January 2022 on Script Proposals
16.0	U+11380..11389, 1138B, 1138E, 11390..113B5, 113B7..113C0, 113C2, 113C5, 113C7..113CA, 113CC..113D5, 113D7..113D8, 113E1..113E2	80	L2/22-016		Constable, Peter (2022-04-21), "D.1 12 Tulu / Tulu-Tigalari", UTC #170 Minutes
16.0	U+11380..11389, 1138B, 1138E, 11390..113B5, 113B7..113C0, 113C2, 113C5, 113C7..113CA, 113CC..113D5, 113D7..113D8, 113E1..113E2	80	L2/22-128		Anderson, Deborah; Whistler, Ken; Pournader, Roozbeh; Constable, Peter (2022-07-20), "7 Tulu-Tigalari", Recommendations to UTC #172 July 2022 on Script Proposals
16.0	U+11380..11389, 1138B, 1138E, 11390..113B5, 113B7..113C0, 113C2, 113C5, 113C7..113CA, 113CC..113D5, 113D7..113D8, 113E1..113E2	80	L2/22-260		A, Srinidhi; A, Sridatta (2022-09-25), Proposal to encode three characters in Tulu-Tigalari
16.0	U+11380..11389, 1138B, 1138E, 11390..113B5, 113B7..113C0, 113C2, 113C5, 113C7..113CA, 113CC..113D5, 113D7..113D8, 113E1..113E2	80	L2/22-248		Anderson, Deborah; et al. (2022-10-31), "7 Tulu-Tigalari", Recommendations to UTC #173 October 2022 on Script Proposals
16.0	U+11380..11389, 1138B, 1138E, 11390..113B5, 113B7..113C0, 113C2, 113C5, 113C7..113CA, 113CC..113D5, 113D7..113D8, 113E1..113E2	80	L2/22-241		Constable, Peter (2022-11-09), "D.1.9 Tulu-Tigalari: additional characters", Approved Minutes of UTC Meeting 173
16.0	U+11380..11389, 1138B, 1138E, 11390..113B5, 113B7..113C0, 113C2, 113C5, 113C7..113CA, 113CC..113D5, 113D7..113D8, 113E1..113E2	80	L2/23-157		Constable, Peter (2023-07-31), "Consensus 176-C16", UTC #176 Minutes, "UTC approves the code point change for TULU-TIGALARI LETTER DHA to U+113A4, from the conflicting U+113A5 approved by UTC-170-C9. TULU-TIGALARI LETTER NA remains at U+113A5"
16.0	U+11380..11389, 1138B, 1138E, 11390..113B5, 113B7..113C0, 113C2, 113C5, 113C7..113CA, 113CC..113D5, 113D7..113D8, 113E1..113E2	80	L2/23-217		A, Srinidhi; A, Sridatta (2023-08-18), Summary of Script Extensions for Tulu-Tigalari
16.0	U+11380..11389, 1138B, 1138E, 11390..113B5, 113B7..113C0, 113C2, 113C5, 113C7..113CA, 113CC..113D5, 113D7..113D8, 113E1..113E2	80	L2/23-238R		Anderson, Deborah; Kučera, Jan; Whistler, Ken; Pournader, Roozbeh; Constable, Peter (2023-11-01), "7 Tulu-Tigalari", Recommendations to UTC #177 November 2023 on Script Proposals
16.0	U+11380..11389, 1138B, 1138E, 11390..113B5, 113B7..113C0, 113C2, 113C5, 113C7..113CA, 113CC..113D5, 113D7..113D8, 113E1..113E2	80	L2/23-231		Constable, Peter (2023-12-08), "Section 7", UTC #177 Minutes
16.0	U+11380..11389, 1138B, 1138E, 11390..113B5, 113B7..113C0, 113C2, 113C5, 113C7..113CA, 113CC..113D5, 113D7..113D8, 113E1..113E2	80	L2/24-013R		Anderson, Deborah; Goregaokar, Manish; Kučera, Jan; Whistler, Ken; Pournader, Roozbeh; Constable, Peter (2024-01-22), "5. Kirat Rai and Tulu-Tigalari", Recommendations to UTC #178 January 2024 on Script Proposals
16.0	U+11380..11389, 1138B, 1138E, 11390..113B5, 113B7..113C0, 113C2, 113C5, 113C7..113CA, 113CC..113D5, 113D7..113D8, 113E1..113E2	80	L2/24-166		Anderson, Deborah; Goregaokar, Manish; Kučera, Jan; Whistler, Ken; Pournader, Roozbeh; Constable, Peter (2024-07-18), "23. Beta Feedback: Inconsistent representative glyphs for consonant-preceding rephas [Affects U+113D1]", Recommendations to UTC #180 July 2024 on Script Proposals
16.0	U+11380..11389, 1138B, 1138E, 11390..113B5, 113B7..113C0, 113C2, 113C5, 113C7..113CA, 113CC..113D5, 113D7..113D8, 113E1..113E2	80	L2/24-159		Constable, Peter (2024-07-29), "Action Item 180-A105", UTC #180 Minutes, "Update reference glyphs for U+113D1 TULU-TIGALARI REPHA to not use a dotted circle"
