= Tulu language =

Dravidian language of Tulu Nadu region

Tulu
- Tuḷu Bāse
- 𑎡𑎻𑎳𑎻 𑎨𑎸𑎱𑏂 ತುಳು ಬಾಸೆ • തുളു ബാസെ (Note: Tulu can be written in three different scripts: Tulu bāse is written in Tulu script, ತುಳು ಬಾಸೆ in Kannada script, and തുളു ഭാഷെ in Malayalam script. ಭಾಷೆ bhāṣe, ಭಾಶೆ bhāśe, and ಬಾಶೆ bāśe are alternative spellings for the Tulu word bāse in the Kannada script. The correct spelling for the word "language" in Kannada is ಭಾಷೆ bhāṣe, but that is not necessarily true in Tulu. Männer's Tulu-English and English-Tulu Dictionary (1886) says, "ಬಾಶೆ, ಬಾಸೆ bāšè, bāsè, see ಭಾಷೆ." (vol. 1, p. 478), "ಭಾಶೆ, ಭಾಷೆ bhāšè, bhāshè, s. Speech, language." (vol. 1, p. 508), meaning that the four spellings are more or less acceptable. The word is actually pronounced ಬಾಸೆ bāse in Tulu. Note that š and sh in his dictionary correspond to ś and ṣ, respectively, in ISO 15919)

- Tulu word written in Tigalari script
- Pronunciation: [t̪uɭu baːsɛ]
- Native to: Southwestern Karnataka and Northern Kerala, India
- Region: Southern India (Tulu Nadu): Karnataka (Mangaluru District and Udupi District); Kerala (northern Kasaragod district)
- Ethnicity: Tuluvas
- Native speakers: 1,850,000 (2011 census)
- Language family: Dravidian: South Dravidian; South Dravidian I; Southwestern Dravidian; Kudiya–Tulu; Tulu
- Dialects: North Brahman, North Common, South Brahman, South Common, Jain, Tribal
- Writing system: Tigalari script Kannada script Malayalam script

Official status
- Official language in: India: Karnataka (Additional official language)
- Regulated by: Karnataka Tulu Sahitya Academy; Kerala Tulu Academy

Language codes
- ISO 639-3: tcy
- Glottolog: tulu1258
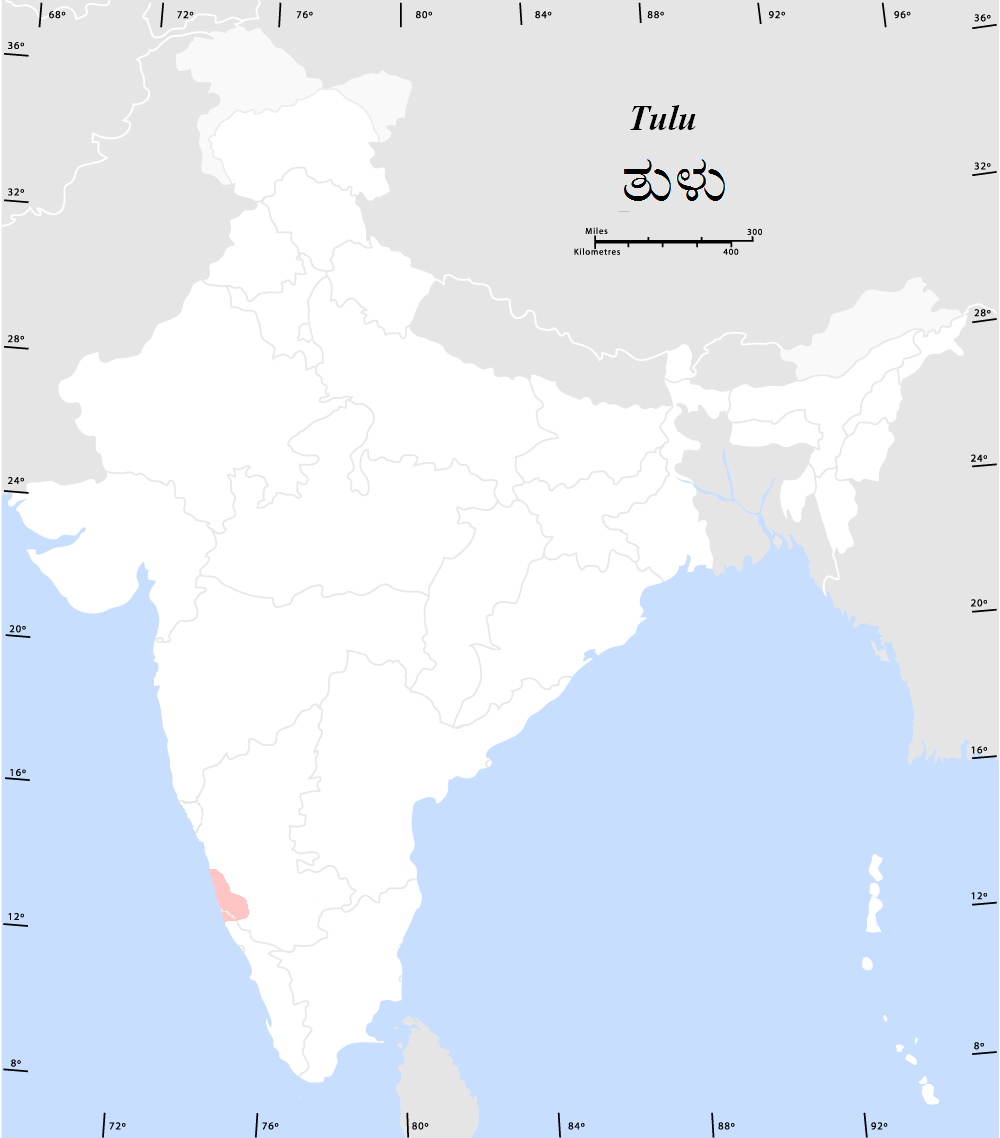
- Major distribution of native Tulu speakers in India

- Tulu is classified as Vulnerable by the UNESCO Atlas of the World's Languages in Danger.

- Person: Tuḷuve
- People: Tuḷuverŭ
- Language: Tuḷu
- Country: Tuḷu Nāḍŭ

A Tulu speaker

The Tulu language (Tuḷu Bāse, Tigalari script: 𑎡𑎻𑎳𑎻 𑎨𑎸𑎱𑏂, Kannada script: ತುಳು ಬಾಸೆ, Malayalam script: തുളു ഭാഷെ; pronunciation in Tulu: [t̪uɭu baːsɛ]) (Note: Tulu can be written in three scripts: Tulu bāse is written in Tulu script, ತುಳು ಬಾಸೆ in Kannada script, and ത‍ുള‍ു ഭാഷെ in Malayalam script. ಭಾಷೆ bhāṣe, ಭಾಶೆ bhāśe, and ಬಾಶೆ bāśe are alternative Kannada-script spellings of the Tulu word bāse. Although ಭಾಷೆ bhāṣe is the standard Kannada spelling for "language", Tulu usage differs. Männer's Tulu-English and English-Tulu Dictionary (1886) lists "ಬಾಶೆ, ಬಾಸೆ bāšè, bāsè, see ಭಾಷೆ" (vol. 1, p. 478) and "ಭಾಶೆ, ಭಾಷೆ bhāšè, bhāshè, s. Speech, language" (vol. 1, p. 508), indicating that all four spellings are acceptable. The word is pronounced ಬಾಸೆ bāse in Tulu. In his dictionary, š and sh correspond to ś and ṣ, respectively, in ISO 15919.) is a Dravidian language and the second additional administrative language alongside Kannada in the Mangaluru and Udupi districts of Karnataka, in south-western India. Its speakers are concentrated in these districts and the northern part of Kasaragod district in Kerala. The native speakers of Tulu are referred to as Tuluva or Tulu people, and their traditional geographical region, comprising the Mangaluru and Udupi districts of Karnataka and northern Kasaragod district of Kerala, is unofficially called Tulu Nadu, where Tulu is the primary spoken language. The Indian census of 2011 reported 1,846,427 native Tulu speakers in India compared with 1,722,768 in the 2001 census. Counting Tulu speakers who have migrated from their native region can be difficult, as they are often recorded as Kannada speakers in Indian census reports.

Separated early from Proto-South Dravidian, Tulu has several features not found in Tamil–Kannada, including the pluperfect and future perfect tenses, which it forms without an auxiliary verb, as in French and Spanish.

Tulu speakers are also found in the Kalasa and Mudigere taluks of Chikkamagaluru district, as well as Tirthahalli and Hosanagar in Shimoga district. The region also has residents whose mother tongues include the Beary language, Havyaka, Konkani, and Koraga, rather than Tulu. Outside Tulu Nadu, significant emigrant Tulu-speaking communities are found in Maharashtra, Bangalore, Chennai, the English-speaking world, and the Gulf countries.

The various medieval inscriptions of Tulu from the 15th century are in the Tigalari script. Two Tulu epics named Sri Bhagavato and Kaveri from the 17th century were also written in the same script. The Tulu language is known for its oral literature in the form of epic poems called pardana. The Epic of Siri and the legend of Koti and Chennayya belong to this category of Tulu literature.

A Tulu "O Bele" folk tale, illustrating the Kabitol song tradition

== Classification ==
Tulu belongs to the southern branch of the family of Dravidian languages. It was the first branch to split from Proto-South Dravidian, which in turn descends from Proto-Dravidian. Tulu shares many features with the central Dravidian languages. Therefore, in earlier branchings, Tulu was sometimes grouped with them; later, it was confirmed that it is from South Dravidian and that it was the first to split from it.

== Etymology ==
The etymology of the word Tulu remains uncertain. Linguist P. Gururaja Bhat states in his book Tulunadu that tuluva originated from turuva (ತುರುವ), in which turu means "cow". He associates the name with a region dominated by the Yadava or cowherd community, expressed in the phrase turugaḷē pradhānavāda nāḍu tuḷunāḍu (ತುರುಗಳೇ ಪ್ರಧಾನವಾದ ನಾಡು ತುಳುನಾಡು).

Linguist Purushottama Bilimale has suggested that tulu means "that which is connected with water". The Tulu word tulave (jackfruit) means "watery". Other water-related words in Tulu include talipu, teli, teḷi, teḷpu, tuḷipu, tulavu and tamel. In Kannada, related words include tuḷuku, meaning "that which has characteristics of water", and toḷe.

== History ==
The oldest available inscriptions in Tulu are from the 7th and 8th century AD. These inscriptions are in the Tulu script and are found in areas in and around Barkur which was the capital of Tulu Nadu during the Vijayanagar period. Another group of inscriptions was found in the Ullur Subrahmanya Temple near Kundapura. Many linguists like S.U. Panniyadi and L. V. Ramaswami Iyer as well as P.S. Subrahmanya claimed that Tulu is among the oldest languages in the Dravidian family which branched independently from its Proto-Dravidian roots nearly 2500 years ago. This assertion is based on the fact that Tulu still preserves many aspects of the Proto-Dravidian language.

This dating of Tulu is also based on the fact that the region where Tulu is natively spoken was known to the ancient Tamils as Tulu Nadu. Also, the Tamil poet Mamular, who belongs to the Sangam Age (200 BC), describes Tulu Nadu and its dancing beauties in one of his poems. In the poetical work "Akananuru", belonging to the Sangam literature (circa 300 BC), there is a mention of Tulunad in its 15th poem. This indicates that the Tulu language is at least around 2,300 years old.

Activities of Tulu language, by a Tulu Wikimedian

In the Kannada Halmidi inscriptions, one finds mention of the Tulu country as the kingdom of the Alupas. The region was also known to the Greeks of the 2nd century as Tolokoyra (Tulu Country). The Charition mime, a Greek play belonging to the 2nd century BC, has its plot centered around the coastal Karnataka, where Tulu is mainly spoken. The play is mostly in Greek, but the Indian characters in the play are seen speaking a language different from Greek. There is considerable ambiguity regarding the Indian language in the play, though all scholars agree the Indian language is Dravidian, there is considerable dispute over which form of it. Noted German Indologist E. Hultzsch (1857–1927) was the first to suggest that the language was Dravidian. The dispute regarding the language in the play is yet to be settled, but scholars agree that the dispute arises from the fact that Old Kannada, Old Tamil, and Tulu during the time when the play was written were perhaps dialectical variations of the same proto-language, and that over the millennia they evolved into their present forms as distinct languages.

=== Status ===
Found largely in Karnataka, it is spoken primarily within the Indian state. Dating back several hundred years, the language has developed numerous defining qualities. The Tulu people follow a saying which promotes leaving negative situations and finding newer, more positive ones. The language, however, is not as popular as others which means it could become endangered and extinct very soon. The influence of other mainstream languages is a present danger for the Tulu language. Today, it is spoken by nearly 1.8 million people around the globe. Large parts of the language are altered and changed constantly because it is commonly passed down through oral tradition. Oral traditions within Tulu have meant that certain phrases have not always maintained the same meaning or importance.

== Geographic distribution ==
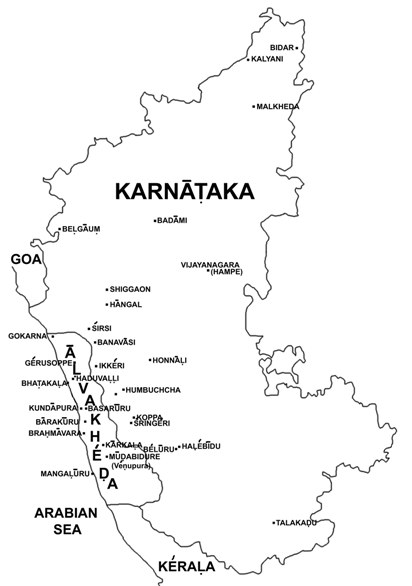
Map showing the ancient Tulu kingdom of Alva Kheda

According to Malayalam works like the Keralolpathi, the region stretching from the Chandragiri river, now part of the Kasaragod district, Kerala, to Gokarna, now part of Uttara Kannada district of Karnataka, was ruled by the Alupas and was known as Alva Kheda. This kingdom was the homeland of the Tulu-speaking people. However, the present-day Tulu linguistic majority area is confined to the region of Tulu Nadu, which comprises the districts of part of Dakshina Kannada and Udupi in the Indian state of Karnataka and the northern part of Kasaragod district of Kerala up to the river Payaswani, also known as Chandragiri. The cities of Mangalore, Udupi and Kasaragod are the centres of Tulu culture.

Even today Tulu is widely spoken in Dakshina Kannada, partially in Udupi district of Karnataka state and to some extent in Kasaragod of Kerala. Efforts are also being made to include Tulu in the list of official languages of India. As a whole, Tulu is largely contained to the southern part of India. The Indian state of Karnataka is where the language seems to thrive in the present day. Some of the major cities within the Tulu culture include Mangalore and Kasaragod.

== Writing system ==
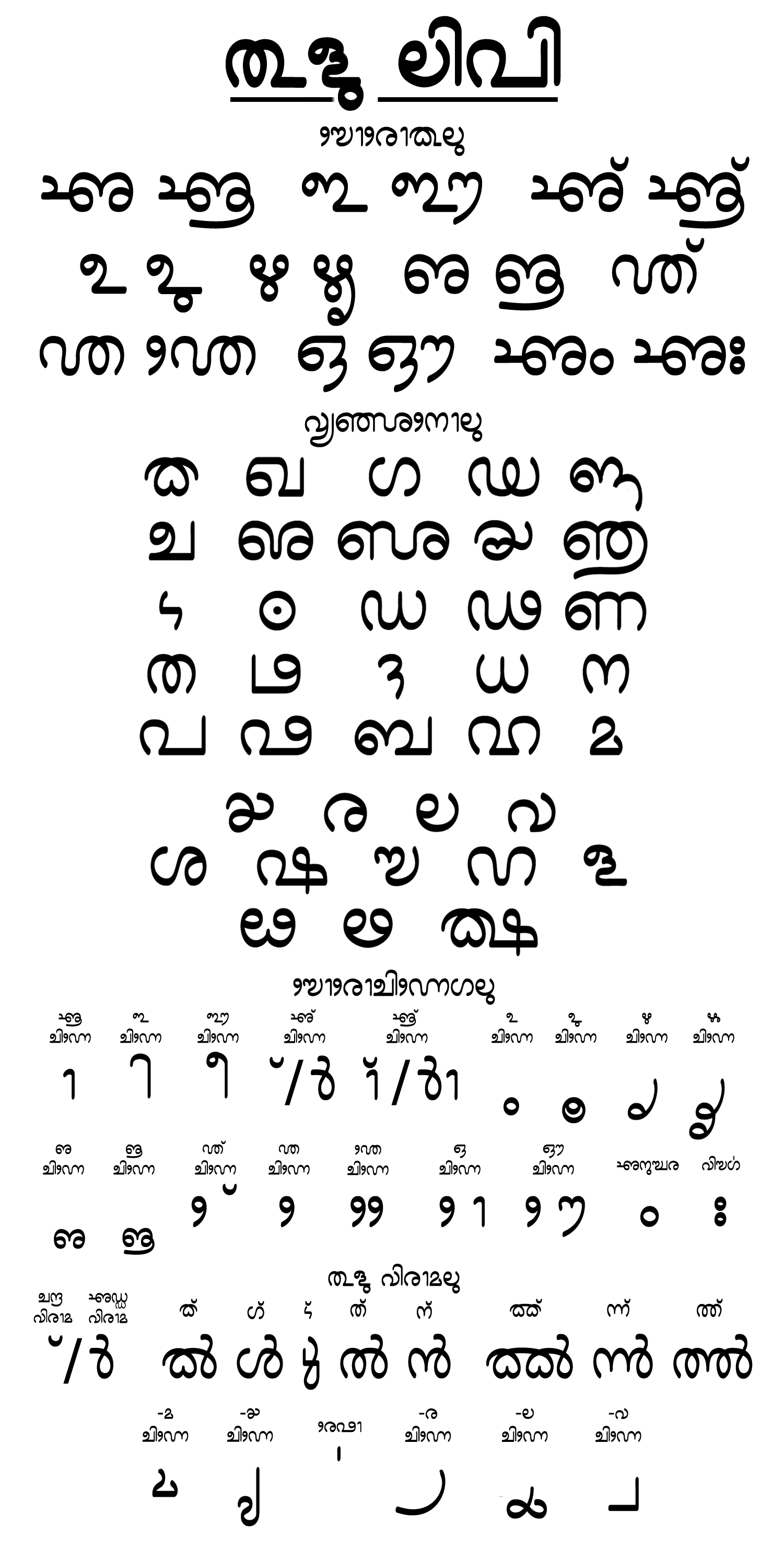
Tulu script

The various historical inscriptions of Tulu found around Barkur and Kundapura are in the Tigalari script. Historically, Brahmins of Tulu Nadu and Havyaka Brahmins used the Tigalari script to write Vedas and other Sanskrit works. The Tulu script is descended from the Brahmi through the Grantha script. It is a sister script of the Malayalam script. However, very few works written in vernacular languages like Kannada and Tulu are available. Hence, the Tulu script was employed by Tulu Brahmins to write Tulu and Kannada languages apart from the Kannada script. The National Mission for Manuscripts has conducted several workshops on this script with the help of a scholar, Keladi Gunda Jois. In the 18th century, the use of the Kannada script for writing Tulu and non-availability of print in the Tulu script contributed to the marginalization of the Ruling Tulu script. The script is studied by few scholars and manuscriptologists for research and religious purposes. The Kannada script has become the contemporary script for the Tulu language gradually. All contemporary works and literature are done in the Kannada script.

The Tulu characterset was approved by the Central Institute of Indian Languages in 2021.

The Tulu-Tigalari resembles the Malayalam script. The Tulu and Kannada alphabets include a stress on vowels with "a" and "o" sounds.

== Phonology ==
=== Vowels ===
Five short and five long vowels (a, ā, e, ē, u, ū, i, ī, o, ō) are common in Dravidian languages. Like Kodava Takk (and also like Konkani and Sinhala), Tulu also has an [ɛ~æ] like vowel, generally occurring word-finally which is from the old ai. The Kannada script does not have a symbol to specifically represent this vowel, which is often written as a normal e. For example, the first person singular form and the third person singular masculine of a verb are spelled identically in all tenses, both ending in e, but are pronounced differently: the terminating e in the former sounds nearly like 'a' in the English word 'man' (ಮಲ್ಪುವೆ maḷpuve /maɭpuvæ/, "I make"), while that in the latter like 'e' in 'men' (ಮಲ್ಪುವೆ maḷpuve /maɭpuve/, "he makes").

In his grammar of 1932, S. U. Paniyadi used a special vowel sign to denote Tulu /ɛ/ in the Kannada script: according to Bhat, he used two talekaṭṭus for this purpose (usually, a talekaṭṭu means the crest that a Kannada character like ಕ, ತ, ನ has), and the same convention was adopted by Upadhyaya in his 1988 Tulu Lexicon. The long counterpart of this vowel occurs in some words. In all dialects, the pair /e/ and /ɛ/ contrasts.

Additionally, like Kodava Takk and Toda, and like Malayalam saṁvr̥tōkāram and Tamil kuṟṟiyalugaram, Tulu has an [ɯ]-like vowel (or schwa /ə/) as a phoneme, which is romanized as ŭ (ISO), ɯ, or u̥. Both J. Brigel and A. Männer say that it is pronounced like e in the French je. Bhat describes this phoneme as /ɯ/. However, if it is like Malayalam "half-u", [ə] or [ɨ] may be a better description. /ɛ/ formed from previous ai and previous /u/ split into modern /u, ɯ/; long versions of /ɛ, ɯ/ are extremely restricted. In the Kannada script, Brigel and Männer used a virama (halant) (್) to denote /ɯ/ like in Malayalam. Bhat says a talekaṭṭu is used for this purpose, but apparently he too means a virama.

Vowels
	Front		Back			
	Front		Rounded		Unrounded	
	Short	Long	Short	Long	Short	Long
Close	i	iː	u	uː	ɯ	(ɯː)
Mid	e	eː	o	oː		
Open	ɛ	(ɛː)			a	aː

Tulu is characterized by its rounding of front vowels when between a labial and a retroflex consonant, e.g., PD. ∗peṇ > Tamil peṇ, Kannada heṇṇu, Tulu poṇṇu, this feature also occurs in Kodava and Spoken Tamil e.g. Kodava, Spoken Tamil poṇṇï, exceptions include {tū, sū}, buttu, pili, Tamil tī, vittu, puli.

=== Consonants ===
The following are consonant phonemes in Tulu:

Consonants
		Labial	Dental	Retroflex	Palatal	Velar
Nasal		m	n	ɳ	ɲ	ŋ
Plosive/ Affricate	Voiceless	p	t	ʈ	c (t͡ʃ)	k
Plosive/ Affricate	Voiced	b	d	ɖ	ɟ (d͡ʒ)	ɡ
Fricative			s		( ʃ )	
Approximant		ʋ			j	
Lateral			l	( ɭ )		
Rhotic			ɾ			

The contrast between /l/ and /ɭ/ is preserved in the South Common dialect and in the Brahmin dialect, but is lost in several dialects. Additionally, the Brahmin dialect has /ʂ/ and /ɦ/. Aspirated consonants are sometimes used in the Brahmin dialect, but are not phonemic. In the Koraga and Holeya dialects, s /s/ and ś /ʃ/ merge with c /t͡ʃ/ (the Koraga dialect of the Tulu language is different from the Koraga language). Word-initial consonant clusters are rare and occur mainly in Sanskrit loanwords.

Tulu is characterized by its r/l and s/c/t alternation, for e.g. sarɛ, tarɛ across Tulu dialects compare with Kannada tale. The alveolar ṯ, ṯṯ, nṯ became post alveolar or dental, the singular ones usually becomes a trill in other Dravidian languages, e.g. Tamil oṉṟu, āṟu, nāṟu, nāṟṟam, muṟi, kīṟu; Tulu oñji, āji, nāduni, nāta, {mudipuni, muyipuni}, {kīruni, gīcuni}. The retroflex approximant mostly became a /ɾ/ and also /ɭ, ɖ/, e.g. Tamil ēẓu, puẓu, Tulu {ēḷŭ, ēlŭ, ēḍŭ}, puru.

=== Dialectal differences ===
"to stumble"
eḍaṅku - north Brahman
eḍeṅku - south Brahman
daṅku - north non Brahman
ḍaṅku, daṅku - south non Brahman
eḍagu - Kannada

"to call"
oḷepu - north Brahman
oḷeppu - south Brahman
leppu - non Brahman
uḷappu - Tamil

"sweet potato"
keḷaṅgŭ, keḷeṅgŭ - Brahman
kireṅgŭ - north non Brahman
kereṅgŭ - south non Brahman
kiḻaṅgu - Tamil

"head"
tarε - Brahman
tarε - north non Brahman
sarε - south non Brahman
harε - Jain
carε - Harijan/Tribal
talai - Tamil

"leaves"
sappu - Brahman
tappu - north non Brahman
sappu - south non Brahman
cappu - Tamil

Main changes include ḻ > ḷ in Brahman dialects and r in others; Tamil-Malayalam like eCa/oCa > iCa/uCa in north non Brahman; c- > t- in north non Brahman, t- > c- > s- in south non Brahman, t- > c- > s- > h- in Jain dialects and t, s > c in Harijan/Tribal dialects; ḷ, ṇ > l, n in non Brahman dialects and sporadic deletion of initial vowel in non Brahman dialects.

== Grammar ==
=== Morphology ===
Tulu has five parts of speech: nouns (substantives and adjectives), pronouns, numerals, verbs, and particles.

Substantives have three grammatical genders (masculine, feminine, and neutral), two numbers (singular and plural), and eight cases (nominative, genitive, dative, accusative, locative, ablative or instrumental, communicative, and vocative). According to Bhat, Tulu has two distinct locative cases. The communicative case is used with verbs like tell, speak, ask, beseech, inquire, and denotes at whom a message, an inquiry, or a request is aimed, as in "I told him." or "I speak to them." It is also used to denote the relationship with whom it is about, in a context like "I am on good terms with him." or "I have nothing against him." Bhat calls it the sociative case. It is somewhat similar to the comitative case, but different in that it denotes communication or relationship, not physical companionship. The plural suffix is -rŭ, -ḷu, -kuḷu, or -āḍḷu; as in mēji ('table'), mējiḷu ('tables'). The nominative case is unmarked, while the remaining cases are expressed by different suffixes.

The following table shows the declension of a noun, based on Brigel and Bhat (u̥ used by Brigel and ɯ used by Bhat are both shown as ŭ for clarity): when two forms are given, the one in parentheses is by Bhat, and the other is by Brigel. Some of these differences may be dialectal variations.

Declension of substantives: example mara ('a tree')
Case	Singular	Meaning	Plural	Meaning
Nominative	mara	'a tree'	marokuḷu (marakulu)	'trees'
Genitive	marata	'of a tree'	marokuḷe (marakulena)	'of trees'
Dative	maroku (marakŭ)	'to a tree'	marokuḷegŭ (marakulegŭ)	'to trees'
Accusative	maronu (maranŭ)	'a tree' (object)	marokuḷenŭ (marakulenŭ)	'trees' (object)
Locative	maroṭu (maraṭŭ)	'in a tree'	marokuḷeḍŭ (marakuleḍŭ)	'in trees'
Locative 2	— (maraṭɛ)	'at or through a tree'	— (marakuleḍɛ)	'at or through trees'
Ablative	maroḍŭdu (maraḍdŭ)	'from, by, or through a tree'	marokuḷeḍŭdŭ (marakuleḍdŭ)	'from, by, or through trees'
Communicative	maraṭa	'to a tree'	marokuḷeḍa (marakuleḍa)	'to trees'
Vocative	marā	'O tree!'	marokuḷē (marakulɛ̄)	'O trees!'

The personal pronouns are irregularly inflected: yānŭ 'I' becomes yen- in oblique cases. Tulu makes the distinction between the inclusive and exclusive we (see Clusivity: Dravidian languages): nama 'we (including you)' as opposed to yenkuḷu 'we (not including you)'. For verbs, this distinction does not exist. The personal pronouns of the second person are ī (oblique: nin-) 'you (singular)' and nikuḷu 'you (plural)'. Three genders are distinguished in the third person, as well as proximate and remote forms. For example, imbe 'he (proximate)', āye 'he (remote)'. The suffix -rŭ makes a polite form of personal pronouns, as in īrŭ 'you (respectfully)', ārŭ 'he (remote; respectfully)'. Postpositions are used usually with a noun in the genitive case, as in guḍḍe-da mittŭ 'on the hill'.

Tulu verbs have three forms: active, causative, and reflexive (or middle voice). They conjugate for person, number, gender, tense (present, past, pluperfect, future, and future perfect), mood (indicative, imperative, conditional, infinitive, potential, and subjunctive), and polarity (positive and negative).

=== Syntax ===
Each sentence is composed of a subject and a predicate and every sentence is a full speech or thought in words. There is both singular and plural while being expressed in first through third person. There are several exceptions to each of these depending on the instance. For example: the verb has to be in a plural style if there are numerous nominatives within a sentence or of different genders that agree with the previous sentence. The verb may also be omitted in some sentences. Present tense and past tense may change and their perception and it is also dependent on the situation and a particular person who is standing next.

== Dialects and Tuluoid languages ==
Tulu language has four dialects:

Common Tulu
Spoken by the majority including the Bunts, Billava, Vishwakarma, Mogaveera, Tulu Madivala (Madialnakl), Tulu Gowda, Kulala, Devadiga, Jogi, Padmashali communities among others. This is the dialect of commerce, trade and entertainment and is mainly used for inter-community communication. It is further subdivided into eight groups:
1. Northwest Tulu: spoken in Udupi
2. Central Tulu: spoken in Mangalore
3. Northeast Tulu: spoken in Karkala and Belthangady
4. Northern Tulu: spoken in Kundapura, also known as KundaTulu because of Kundagannada dialect influence
5. Southwest Tulu: spoken in Manjeshwar and Kasaragod, known as Kasaragod Tulu influencing Malayalam
6. Southcentral Tulu: spoken in Bantwal
7. Southeast Tulu: Spoken in Puttur Sullia and in some villages/Taluks of Coorg (Kodagu).
8. Southern Tulu: spoken in South of Kasaragod and Payaswini (Chandragiri) river influencing Malayalam known as Thenkaayi Tulu
Brahmin Tulu
Spoken by the Tulu Brahmins who are subdivided into Shivalli Brahmins, Sthanika Brahmins and Tuluva Hebbars. It is more influenced by Sanskrit.
Jain dialect
Spoken by the Tulu Jains. It is a dialect where the initial letters 'T' and 'S' have been replaced by the letter 'H'. For example, the word Tare is pronounced as Hare, Saadi is pronounced as Haadi.
Adivasi dialect
Spoken by the Koraga, Mansa, and other tribals of Tulu Nadu.

Apart from that there are languages which are closely related to Tulu, named as the branch Tuluoid. They are Koraga (Mudu and Korra), Markodi or Mavilan Tulu, Kudiya and Bellari.

== Written literature ==
The written literature of Tulu is not as large as the literature of other literary Dravidian languages. Nevertheless, Tulu is one of only five literary Dravidian languages, the other four being Telugu, Tamil, Kannada, and Malayalam. The earliest available Tulu literature that survives to this date is the Tulu translation of the great Sanskrit epic of Mahabharata called Mahabharato (ಮಹಾಭಾರತೊ). It was written by Arunabja (1657 AD), a poet who lived in Kodavur near Udupi around the late 14th to mid 15th century AD. Other important literary works in Tulu are:

- Devi Mahatmyam (ಶ್ರೀ ದೇವಿ ಮಹಾತ್ಮೆ) 1200 AD – Tulu translation
- Sri Bhagavato (ಶ್ರೀ ಭಾಗವತೊ) 1626 AD – written by Vishnu Tunga
- Kaveri (1391 AD)

This script was mainly used to write religious and literary works in Sanskrit. Even today the official script of the eight Tulu monasteries (Ashta Mathas of Udupi) founded by Madhvacharya in Udupi is Tulu. The pontiffs of the monasteries write their names using this script when they are appointed.

Modern-day Tulu literature is written using the Kannada script. Mandara Ramayana is the most notable piece of modern Tulu literature. Written by Mandara Keshava Bhatt, it received the Sahitya Akademi Award for best poetry. Madipu, Mogaveera, Saphala and Samparka are popular Tulu periodicals published from Mangalore. The Tulu Sahitya Academy, established by the state government of Karnataka in 1994, as also the Kerala Tulu Academy established by the Indian State Government of Kerala in Manjeshwaram in 2007, are important governmental organisations that promote Tulu literature. Nevertheless, there are numerous organisations spread all over the world with significant Tulu-migrated populations that contribute to Tulu literature. Some notable contributors to Tulu literature are Kayyar Kinhanna Rai, M. K. Seetharam Kulal, Amruta Someshwara, B. A. Viveka Rai, Kedambadi Jattappa Rai, Venkataraja Puninchathaya, Paltadi Ramakrishna Achar, Dr. Sunitha M. Shetty, Dr. Vamana Nandavara, Sri. Balakrishna Shetty Polali.

One of the old Tulu works Kaveri

One of the old Tulu works Mahabharato

One of the old Tulu works Shree Bhagavato

Mandara Ramayana

== Oral traditions ==
The oral traditions of Tulu are one of the major traditions that greatly show the finer aspects of the language. The following are various forms of Tulu oral tradition and literature.

- Paddanas: A form of oral epic poem sung in a highly stylised manner during the Hindu rituals of Bhuta Kola and Nagaradhane, which are peculiar to the Tulu people. These Paddanas are mostly legends about gods or historical personalities among the people. The longest of them is Siri Paddana, which is about a woman called Siri who shows strength and integrity during adverse times and in turn attains divinity. The Paddana greatly depicts the independent nature of the Tulu womenfolk. The entire Paddana was written down by Finnish scholar Lauri Honko of the University of Turku and it falls four lines short of Homer's Iliad.
- Riddles: They are another important aspect of Tulu oral traditions. These riddles are largely tongue twisting and mostly deal with kinship and agriculture.
- Bhajans: Bhajans sung in numerous temples across the Tulu region are varied and are dedicated to various gods and goddesses. Most of these are of the Hindu tradition, others being Jain. They are sung in both the Carnatic style as well a style similar to what is used in Yakshagana.
- Kabitol: Songs sung during the cultivation of crops, the traditional occupation of the people. O Bele is considered the finest among them.

Tulu Folk Culture Bedan

A traditional Tulu proverb (gaadelu)

== Theatre ==
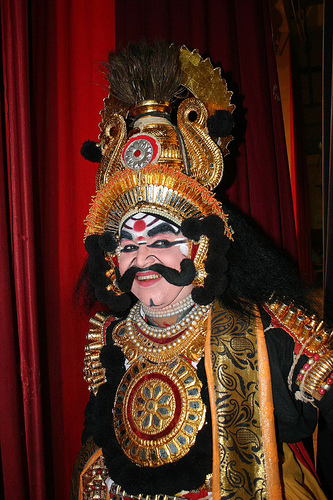
A Yakshagana artist

Theatre in the form of the traditional Yakshagana, prevalent in coastal Karnataka and northern Kerala has greatly preserved the finer aspects of the Tulu language. Yakshagana which is conducted in Tulu is very popular among the Tuluva people. It can also be seen as a form of temple art, as there are many Yakshagana groups that are attached to temples, for example that of Kateel Durga Parameshwari Temple as also the Udupi Krishna Temple.

Presently, eight professional Yakshagana troupes perform Tulu-language Yakshagana not only during the Yakshagana season but also during the off-season in various places in Karnataka and outside. In Mumbai, Tulu Yakshagana is very popular among the Tulu audiences. More than 2,000 Yakshagana artistes take part in the performance in various places in Mumbai annually. Notable performers include Kalladi Koraga Shetty, Pundur Venkataraja Puninchathaya, Guru Bannanje Sanjiva Suvarna and Pathala Venkatramana Bhat.

Tulu plays are among the major entertainment for admirers of art and culture in Tulu Nadu. Tulu plays, generally centered on the comic genre, are very popular in Mumbai and Bangalore outside Tulu Nadu.

== Cinema ==
The Tulu cinema industry is fairly small; it produces around five films annually. The first film, Enna Thangadi, was released in 1971. Usually these films are released in theatres across the Tulu Nadu region and on DVD. The critically acclaimed film Suddha won the award for Best Indian Film at Osian's Cinefan Festival of Asian and Arab Cinema in New Delhi in 2006. As of 2015, Oriyardori Asal (2011) has been the most commercially successful Tulu film. Chaali Polilu is the longest-running film in Tulu film history, as well as the highest-grossing film in the Tulu film industry. It has successfully completed 470 days at PVR Cinemas in Mangalore. The 2014 film Madime was reported to be remade in Marathi, thereby becoming the first Tulu film to be remade in another language. Shutterdulai was the first remake in Tulu cinema. Eregla Panodchi is the second remake in Tulu cinemas. A suit for damages of Rs. 25 lakh was filed against the makers of the Telugu film Brahmotsavam for copying the first 36 seconds of the song A...lele...yereg madme by Dr. Vamana Nandaavara found in the Deepanalike CD composed for the Siri channel. Prajavani reported that with its dubbing rights sold to Hindi for Rs. 21 lakh, the 2018 movie Umil became the first Tulu movie to achieve the feat. Ashwini Kotiyan (Chaya Harsha) became the first female director in the Tulu industry after directing and releasing her first movie Namma Kudla. Brahmashree Narayana Guruswamy released on 2 May 2014 was the 50th Tulu film. Panoda Bodcha marked the 75th release anniversary of a Tulu film. The 100th Tulu movie Karne was released on 16 November 2018.

Guddada Bhootha, a television series aired in 1990, was one of the successful ventures of Tulu entertainment. This mini-series has a suspense storyline based on a Tulu drama, showing the country life of Tulu Nadu region of India. It was one of the popular TV series of that time. This series has a very famous title song Dennana Dennana sung by B. R. Chaya. This song along with the music were used in Rangitaranga, a Kannada movie.

== Official status ==
Tulu is the 2nd additional administrative language alongside Kannada in the Dakshina Kannada and Udupi districts only. However, it is still not declared as the official language. Efforts are being made to include Tulu in the 8th Schedule of the Constitution. On December 2009, during the First Vishwa Tulu Sammelan organized at Ujire-Dharmastala, the then Karnataka Chief Minister B. S. Yediyurappa promised to send a fresh proposal on including Tulu in the eighth schedule of the Constitution. On August 2017, an online campaign was organized to include Tulu in the 8th schedule of the Constitution. On October 2017, when prime minister Narendra Modi visited the Dharmasthala Temple, the same demand was presented in front of him. Similarly, in 2018, a Member of Parliament from the Kasargod constituency, P. Karunakaran, also raised the same demand for inclusion of Tulu in the 8th schedule of the Constitution. On 19 February 2020, Vedavyas Kamath, a member of the Mangaluru (south) segment of the Legislative Assembly, submitted a memorandum to chief minister B. S. Yediyurappa and to the minister for tourism, Kannada and culture, C. T. Ravi, seeking official status for the Tulu language. On February 2020, another MLA from Moodbidri, Umanath Kotian, urged the state government to put pressure on the union government to add Tulu to the eighth schedule during the assembly session. On July 2021, members of the three main parties in Karnataka politics: BJP, Congress and Janata Dal (Secular), lent their support to the idea. On September 18, 2026, the Karnataka Cabinet approved the official recognition of Tulu as the state’s “second additional language” for administrative purposes in Dakshina Kannada and Udupi districts. Chief Minister D. K. Shivakumar announced the decision after the Cabinet meeting in Mangaluru.

== Centres of Tulu study and research ==
The front cover of the Tulu dictionary published by Männer in 1886

Tulu as a language continues to thrive in coastal Karnataka and Kasaragod in Kerala. Karnataka Tulu Sahitya Academy, an institute established by the state government of Karnataka in 1994, has introduced Tulu as a language in schools around coastal Karnataka, including Alva's High School, Moodbidri; Dattanjaneya High School, Odiyoor; Ramakunjeshwara English-medium High School, Ramakunja; and Vani Composite Pre-University College, Belthangady. Initially started in 16 schools, the language is now taught in over 33 schools, of which 30 are in Dakshina Kannada district. More than 1500 students have opted to study this language.

The Government of Kerala established the Kerala Tulu Academy in 2007. The academy focuses on the retrieval and propagation of Tulu language and culture in Kerala through various activities such as organising seminars and publishing Tulu periodicals, etc. The academy is based in Hosangadi, Manjeshwar in Kasaragod. Tulu is also taught as a language at the post-graduate level in Mangalore University, and there is a dedicated department for Tulu studies, translation and research at Dravidian University in Kuppam Andhra Pradesh.The Government Degree College at Kasaragod in Kerala also introduced a certificate course in Tulu for the academic year 2009–2010. It has also introduced Tulu as an optional subject in its Kannada post-graduation course. It has adopted syllabi from the books published by the Tulu Sahitya Academy.

German missionaries Kammerer and Männer were the first people to conduct research on the language. Kammerer collected about 3,000 words and their meanings before his death. Later his work was carried on by Männer, who completed the research and published the first dictionary of the Tulu language in 1886 with the help of the then-Madras government. The effort was incomplete, as it did not cover all aspects of the language. The Govinda Pai Research Centre at MGM College, Udupi started an 18-year Tulu lexicon project in the year 1979.

Different dialects, special vocabularies used for different occupational activities, rituals, and folk literature in the forms of Paād-danāas were included in this project. The Centre has also released a six-volume, trilingual, modestly priced Tulu-Kannada-English lexicon. The Tulu lexicon was awarded the Gundert Award for the best dictionary in the country in 1996. In September 2011, the Academic Council of Mangalore University accepted a proposal, to allow the university and the colleges affiliated to it to offer certificates, diplomas and postgraduate diploma courses in Tulu, both in regular and correspondence modes.

== Sample text ==
The following text is Article 1 of the Universal Declaration of Human Rights, written in Tulu::

Tigalari script

𑎪𑎸𑎡𑎸 𑎥𑎬𑎪𑎸𑎥𑎹𑎭𑎻𑏎 𑎱𑏎𑎮𑎡𑏌𑎡𑏎𑎬𑎮𑎸𑎣𑏎 𑎨𑏇𑎒𑏎𑎒 𑎔𑏈𑎬𑎮𑏇𑎞𑎻 𑎨𑏇𑎒𑏎𑎒 𑎲𑎒𑏎𑎒𑎻𑎭𑏂𑎞𑏎 𑎱𑎪𑎸𑎥𑎮𑎸𑎣𑏎 𑎦𑎻𑎜𑏎𑎜𑎻𑎮𑏂𑎬𑏎. 𑎀𑎒𑎻𑎭𑎻 𑎡𑎬𑏎𑎒 𑎨𑏇𑎒𑏎𑎒 𑎁𑎡𑏎𑎪𑎱𑎸𑎒𑏎𑎰𑎹𑎞𑏎 𑎦𑎻𑎔𑎬𑏎𑎡𑏂 𑎦𑎞𑏂𑎫𑎹𑎥𑎒𑎻𑎭𑎻 𑎨𑏇𑎒𑏎𑎒 𑎐𑎬𑎹 𑎐𑎬𑎹 𑎱𑏇𑎣𑎬𑎡𑏎𑎮𑎣 𑎩𑎸𑎮𑏇𑎞𑎻 𑎮𑎬𑏎𑎡𑎥𑏂 𑎪𑎭𑏎𑎦𑏇𑎞𑎻.

Kannada script

ಮಾತಾ ನರಮಾನಿಲ್ ಸ್ವತಂತ್ರವಾದ್ ಬೊಕ್ಕ ಗೌರವೊಡು ಬೊಕ್ಕ ಹಕ್ಕುಲೆಡ್ ಸಮಾನವಾದ್ ಪುಟ್ಟುವೆರ್. ಅಕುಲು ತರ್ಕ ಬೊಕ್ಕ ಆತ್ಮಸಾಕ್ಷಿಡ್ ಪುಗರ್ತೆ ಪಡೆಯಿನಕುಲು ಬೊಕ್ಕ ಒರಿ ಒರಿ ಸೋದರತ್ವದ ಭಾವೊಡು ವರ್ತನೆ ಮಲ್ಪೊಡು.

Malayalam script

മാതാ നരമാനിലു് സ്വതന്ത്രവാദു് ബൊക്ക ഗൗരവൊഡു ബൊക്ക ഹക്കുലെഡു് സമാനവാദു് പുട്ടുവെർ. അകുലു തർക ബൊക്ക ആത്മസാക്ഷിഡ് പുഗർതെ പഡെയിനകുലു ബൊക്ക ഒരി ഒരി സോദരത്വദ ഭാവൊഡു വർതനെ മല്പൊഡു.

Romanisation

Mātā naramānilŭ svatantravādŭ bokka gauravoḍu bokka hakkuleḍŭ samānavādŭ puṭṭuver. Akulu tarka bokka ātmasākṣiḍ pugarte paḍeyinakulu bokka ori ori sōdaratvad bhāvoḍu vartane malpoḍu.

Translation

Article 1: All human beings are born free and equal in dignity and rights. They are endowed with reason and conscience and should act towards one another in a spirit of brotherhood.

== Unicode ==
The Tigalari script was added to the Unicode Standard in September 2024 with the release of version 16.0. The Unicode block for Tigalari, named Tulu-Tigalari, is located at U+11380–U+113FF:

Tulu-Tigalari^{[1]}^{[2]} Official Unicode Consortium code chart (PDF)
	0	1	2	3	4	5	6	7	8	9	A	B	C	D	E	F
U+1138x	𑎀	𑎁	𑎂	𑎃	𑎄	𑎅	𑎆	𑎇	𑎈	𑎉		𑎋			𑎎	
U+1139x	𑎐	𑎑	𑎒	𑎓	𑎔	𑎕	𑎖	𑎗	𑎘	𑎙	𑎚	𑎛	𑎜	𑎝	𑎞	𑎟
U+113Ax	𑎠	𑎡	𑎢	𑎣	𑎤	𑎥	𑎦	𑎧	𑎨	𑎩	𑎪	𑎫	𑎬	𑎭	𑎮	𑎯
U+113Bx	𑎰	𑎱	𑎲	𑎳	𑎴	𑎵		𑎷	𑎸	𑎹	𑎺	𑎻	𑎼	𑎽	𑎾	𑎿
U+113Cx	𑏀		𑏂			𑏅		𑏇	𑏈	𑏉	𑏊		𑏌	𑏍	𑏎	𑏏
U+113Dx	𑏐	𑏑	𑏒	𑏓	𑏔	𑏕		𑏗	𑏘							
U+113Ex		𑏡	𑏢													
U+113Fx																
Notes 1.As of Unicode version 18.0 2.Grey areas indicate non-assigned code points

== See also ==
- Tulunadu
- Tulu people
- Aliya Kattu
- Tulunadu state movement

== Sources ==
- Krishnamurti, Bhadriraju (2003), The Dravidian Languages, Cambridge University Press, ISBN 0-521-77111-0
