= Seri Yek-e Zarruk =

Seri Yek-e Zarruk سري يك زروك
- Village
- Location within Iran
- Coordinates: 31°44′28″N 48°41′29″E
- Country: Iran
- Province: Khuzestan
- County: Shushtar
- Bakhsh: Shadravan
- Rural District: Shoaybiyeh-ye Gharbi

Population (2006)
  - Total: 703
- Time zone: UTC+3:30 (IRST)
  - Summer (DST): UTC+4:30 (IRDT)

Seri Yek-e Zarruk (Persian: سري يك زروك, also Romanized as Serī Yek-e Zarrūk; also known as Serī-ye Yek) is a village in Shoaybiyeh-ye Gharbi Rural District, Shadravan District, Shushtar County, Khuzestan Province, Iran. At the 2006 census, its population was 703, in 118 families.
