= Epic of Siri =

Indian epic poem in the Tulu language

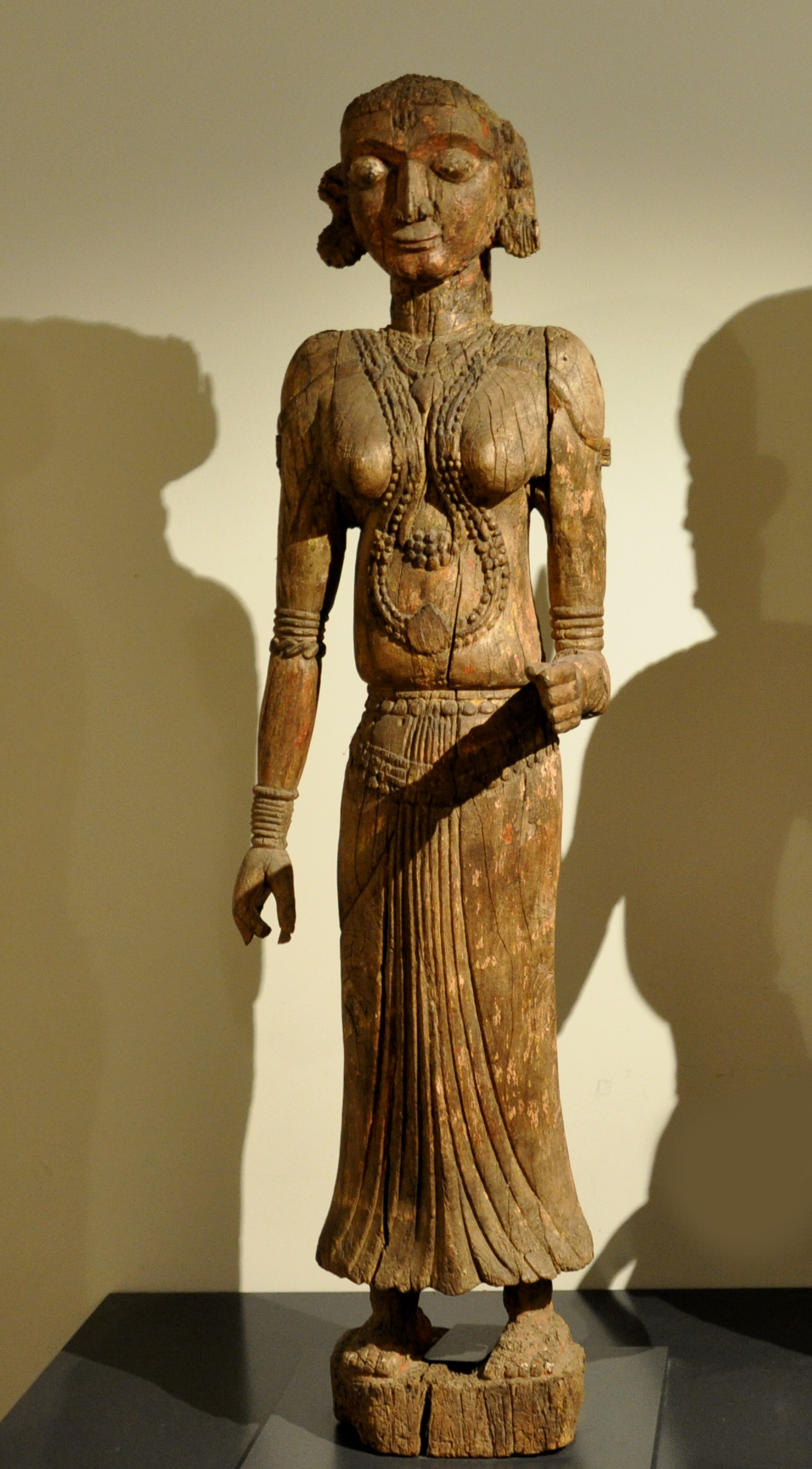
Abbaga Daraka at Rietberg Museum in Zurich, Switzerland

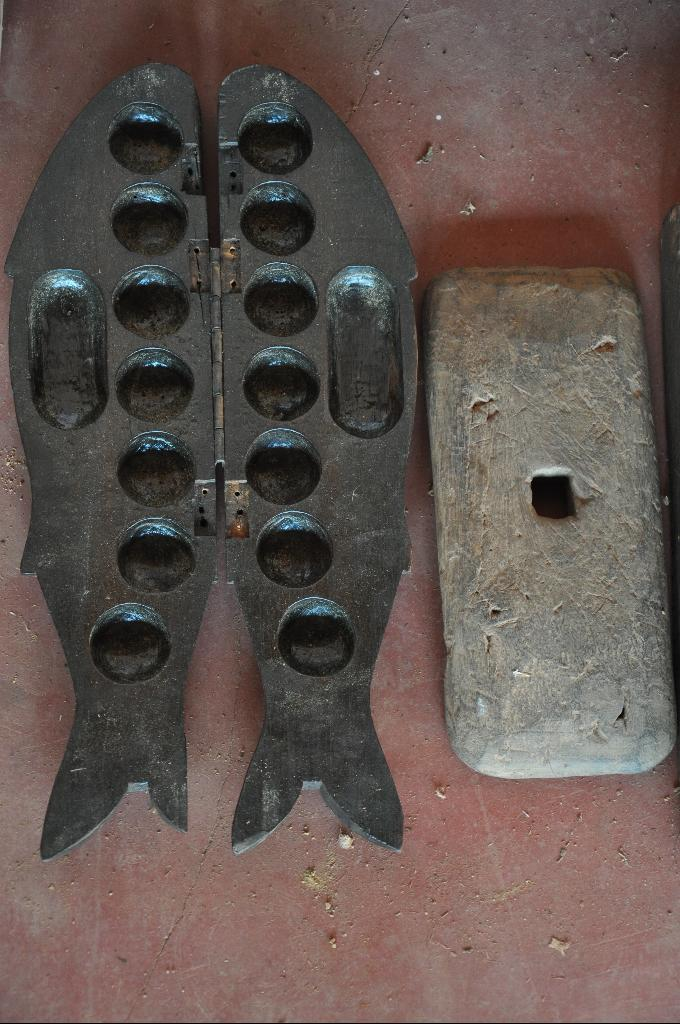
The board game of 'cenne' is mentioned in the epic of Siri

The Siri Sandhi, also Siri Paddana (pronounced: Siri Paadhdhana) or Epic of Siri, is an epic poem in the Tulu language. Consisting of 15,683 lines of poetry, it is the longest poem in Tulu. The epic is essentially a biography of a legendary Bunt princess Siri Alvedi and expands to describe the fate of her progeny – son Kumara, daughter Sonne and grand daughters Abbage and Darage. The epic declares Siri's divinity and also that of her progeny and she is worshipped as a Daiva (demi goddess) across Tulu Nadu region of South West India in temples known as Adi Alade. Siri is the patron deity of the Tulu people. Her worship and mass possession cult surrounding her transgresses caste and ethnic lines. The Epic of Siri, though in Tulu, is well known in Kannada speaking populations in and around Tulu Nadu. It is recited in parts in a highly ritual style during the annual festival of Siri Jatre and mass possession festival called Dayyol. Complete recitation of the epic takes close to about 25 hours. The Epic of Siri has been translated into English by Lauri Honko, a Finnish linguo-folklorist.

== Plot summary ==
According to the legend, there existed a principality of Sathyanapura whose ruler was an aging Bunt man of Arya Bannaya Bali lineage named Bermanna Alva (Alupas ?). He had retired to his manor, Majaluttu Beedu, in depression after the death of his wife and only daughter. Annu Shetty, son of one Shankar Alva, a relative, was managing the affairs of the principality on his behalf. Bermanna's constant worry was due to a lack of suitable heir to his throne. He wished for an heir and prayed to Bermer. Bermer, disguising himself as a Brahmin, visited Bermanna and said that his current state of sorrow was because he had neglected the worship of his ancestral deity whose temple lay in ruins in the village of Nidgal. On the advice of Brahma in disguise, Bermanna went to Nidgal, renovated the said temple and conducted puja. He returned home with the Prasadam – Areca nut flowers and sandalwood paste. Overnight the Prasadam turned magically into a little baby girl. Bermanna, realising that the baby was a gift from Bermer himself, brought her up as his own daughter naming her 'Siri'. Siri grew up to be a beautiful maiden. Kantha Poonja, a minor Bunt Feudal Lord of Basrur Beedu fiefdom, longed to marry her. His mother Sankari Poonjedi arranged for her son's wedding to Siri by promising Bermanna that Kantha Poonja would look after the administration of both the principalities (Majaluttu Beedu and Basrur Beedu) without any difference of rank.

After her marriage, Siri soon became pregnant. In the seventh month of her pregnancy, her Bayake (baby shower) is planned. Kantha Poonja goes to a neighbouring town to purchase an expensive saree for her. On his way home, Kantha Poonja visits his mistress, a prostitute named Siddu. Siddu, on seeing the lovely saree, tries it on despite Kantha Poonja's disapproval. Kantha Poonja orders her to remove the saree immediately and fold it again since it is a gift for his wife. On the day of the Bayake, Siri refuses to accept the saree brought by Kantha Poonja, saying that it had adorned a prostitute first. Kantha Poonja is enraged and develops a grudge against Siri for insulting him in front of his guests. Bermanna Alva tries to pacify the couple and then takes his daughter back to Sathyanpura for her delivery, as per prevailing custom. Siri soon delivers a baby boy named Kumara. Bermanna sends the message of the boy's birth to Basrur but no one – neither Kantha Poonja nor his mother – replies. Soon Bermanna Alva dies. A succession battle ensues between Siri and Annu Shetty over the throne of Sathynapura. Kantha Poonja conspires against Siri by joining hands with Annu Shetty. The dispute of succession is taken to a council of elders who are bribed by Kantha Poonja to rule against Siri. Siri, realising the conspiracy through her divine powers, curses Kantha Poonja that his lands should remain barren and his clan remain childless. Through her divine powers she also burns down the Majaluttu Beedu which was now under the possession of Annu Shetty.

Siri then leaves Satynapura accompanied by her infant son Kumara and a maid servant Daru and proceeds towards the forest of Bola. She performs various miracles on her journey to Bola but loses her child and Daru. Soon she meets the twin kings of Bola, Kariya Kaasinghe and Boliya Deesinghe who on hearing her tragedy sympathise and accept her as their foster sister. They also arrange her marriage with Kodsar Alva of Kotradi fiefdom (Kotrapady Guthu). This marriage turns out to be a happy one and she gives birth to daughter name Sonne after which she breathes her last before which she declares that anyone who worships her will have abundance in their life and will be cured of various diseases.

The second part of the story deals with Siri's daughter Sonne, who is married to one Guru Marla. The couple remains childless after many years of marriage. They make a vow to Bermer that if they have children they will devote them to the worship of Bermer. In due course, Sonne becomes pregnant and gives birth to twins girls, Abbage and Darage. Sonne and Guru Marla forget the vow made to Bermer. One day Bermer comes to them disguised as an astrologer. He claims, If you forget your vow, you will be troubled or get into trouble. God may take back his boon. Guru Marla gets angry at this prediction and tells the astrologer to leave immediately. One day, Sonne and Guru Marla have to leave their house for some work. Before leaving, they keep the game of 'Chenne Mane' (a Tulu variation of mancala) in a box and lock it. They do this because they know the girls often quarrel while playing the game. After they leave, Bermer comes to their house disguised as a Brahmin and opens the lock to the Chenne Mane. He tells the girls Abbage and Darrage to play it. Soon the girls start quarreling over the game and in a fit of rage one of the girls strikes the other violently on the head with the wooden board that is used to play the game. The girl succumbs to her injuries and dies. Realising this, the other twin commits suicide by jumping into a well. Sonne and Guru Marla return home and get worried on not finding their daughters. Bermer disguised as a Brahmin appears before them and says 'As you did not fulfill your vow, god has taken back his boon.' He then disappears.

== Worship ==
Siri is worshipped in Tulu Nadu across caste and ethnic lines. There are numerous temples dedicated to her and her progeny called Adi Alade. Five among them are the most important. These Temples are the venue for the annual festival held in her honour called Siri Jatre and also the Daliyopaliyo – a mass possession cult of women associated with her. The Five Temples are

- Adi Alade Temple of Hiriadka in Udupi district, Karnataka, India
- Adi Alade Temple of Pangala in Udupi district, Karnataka, India
- Adi Alade Temple of Nandalike in Udupi district, Karnataka, India
- Adi Alade Temple of Kavathar in Mangaluru District, Karnataka, India
- Adi Alade Temple of Nidgal in Mangaluru District, Karnataka, India
