= Siri (surname) =

Siri is a surname of Italian origin. Notable people with the surname include:

- Alejandro Siri (born 1963), Argentine field hockey player
- Florent Emilio Siri (born 1965), French film director
- Giuseppe Siri (1906–1989), Italian cardinal
- José Siri (born 1995), a Dominican professional baseball outfielder
- Martin Siri (born 1979), Argentine cricketer
- Nicolás Siri (born 2004), Uruguayan footballer
- Preecha Siri, Karen-Thai conservationist and environmentalist
- Román Fresnedo Siri (1903–1975), Uruguayan architect
- Santipap Siri (born 1985), Thai footballer
- Vittorio Siri (1608–1685), also known as Francesco Siri, Italian mathematician and Benedectine monk
- William Siri (1919–2004), American biophysicist

== See also ==
- Siry (disambiguation)
- Sironi
