= Mundaje =

Mundaje is on the Mangalore-Tumkur National Highway, which is 14 km far from the Taluk headquarters Belthangady in Dakshina Kannada (South Canara) of Karnataka. The village spreads nearly 3608 acres.

== Origin of the name ==
There is no proper evidence how the name "Mundaje" came. But the words like "Aje" or "Anje" means the place having water. The river Mrityunjaya is a living example as it won't dry up even in the summer season. Though it is a rural area, the basic facilities like educational institutions, road-transport facility, electricity, telephone, stationery-grocery shops, irrigation, hospital, bank, post office are available to the people. Now a rural BPO too exists.

== Caste-Creed ==
Malekudiyas, Poojari, Jains, Kulal, Gowdas, Holeya, Mera, Nalike, Parava, Madivala, Moili, Aachari are the original residents of the village. The history predicts the existence of a Tuluva Brahmin family in the past. As on the development of the road construction, the fertile land attracted the other caste-creed from outside. Among them are the Chitpavan Brahmins who migrated from the Ratnagiri district of Maharashtra and in the later years Shetty, Naika, Muslims, Kochi Christians, Havyaka-Karhada-Shivalli Brahmins.

== Crop-Irrigation ==
Areca nut may be emerged as main crop along with paddy, after the migration of the Chitpavans. The Chitpavans who resided either side of the river Mrityunjaya had been constructed a Mud Dam near Kapina Bagilu and made avail water through the canals to the Areca fields on both sides of the dam. Out of four Valyas, Mundaje and Majalu valya having dam water as main water resource. Now the mud dam has been replaced by a Vented Dam. In the same way, a mud dam is built near Mundaje Bridge to provide water to Kadamballi Valya and a vented dam near Nidgal across the Netravati River to facilitate Kayartodi valya fields. Still a non-written rule of water management system is in practice in the village. Athyarkanda Agari Paramuka is the local area of mundaje.

== Cultural heritage ==
The villagers are having great cultural background. They involved themselves in the field of Yakshagana, Tala Maddale, Drama, Music, Arts, and Literature. The nationwide famous drama artist Ranganatha Tahmankar is from Mundaje. His "Amba Prasadita Nataka Mandali" made a revolution in the Drama field across Karnataka. Tahmankar family is famous in the field of music and literature. Under the publication ‘Tammana Sahitya Male Mundaje’ M.Ramachandra Bhat contributed a lot for literature for children.

== Public Service-Politics-Co-operative Sector ==
Late Bhide Narayana Bhat laid down stone for the education, healthcare and public services by establishing a trust. Late M.N.Bhide was the member of All_India_Congress_Committee Indian Congress Committee early Independence and also founded All India Areca nut Federation in support to the farmers. Late G.N.Bhide was the President of Belthangady Taluk Board and built a Primary school, a High school, a Pre-University College and an English medium school.

== Other information ==
=== Place of Worship ===
1. Sanyasikatte Shree Parashurama Temple
2. Gundi Shree LakshmiNarayana Swamy Temple
3. Kere Shree Parashurama Temple
4. Nidgal Shree Mahaganapathi Temple
5. Gundadabali Moorthillaya Daivasthana
6. St.Mary's Church and
7. one Mosque are the religious places present in the village. A Co-Operative Bank, Vijaya Bank Branch, Milk Society, Post Office, Primary Healthcare Center, Panchayat Office, Two Hostels For Students and also one Sports Club named Young Challengers Mundaje and a Women’s Club working for all over development of the village.
