= Kerala Tulu Academy =

- Formation: 2007
- Founder: Government of Kerala
- Founded at: Hosangady, Kasargod
- Type: Governmental organisation
- Headquarters: Hosangadi, Kasargod
- Location: Durgippalla, Hosangady
- Region served: Kerala
- Official language: Tulu language
- Website: https://keralatuluacademy.com/

Kerala Tulu Academy is an organisation under Government of Kerala which opened in 2007. The purpose of the academy is to preserve and promote Tulu language, Tulu script, Tulu literature and Tulu culture. It is located in Hosangadi in Kasargod district, Kerala which has a considerable population of Tulu speakers, a language minority in the state. The academy was inaugurated by then Chief Minister V. S. Achuthanandan. The academy is planned to set up its office in Durgippalla near Hosangadi in Kasargod district, Kerala.

Tulu speakers are spread across coastal Karnataka districts, especially towards the south, and the northernmost district of Kerala. The corresponding Tulu promotion organization in Karnataka is Karnataka Tulu Sahitya Academy.

Umesh M Saliyan is the current president of the academy, with Vijayakumar Pavala as secretary.
