= Michael Siris =

American attorney (born 1945)

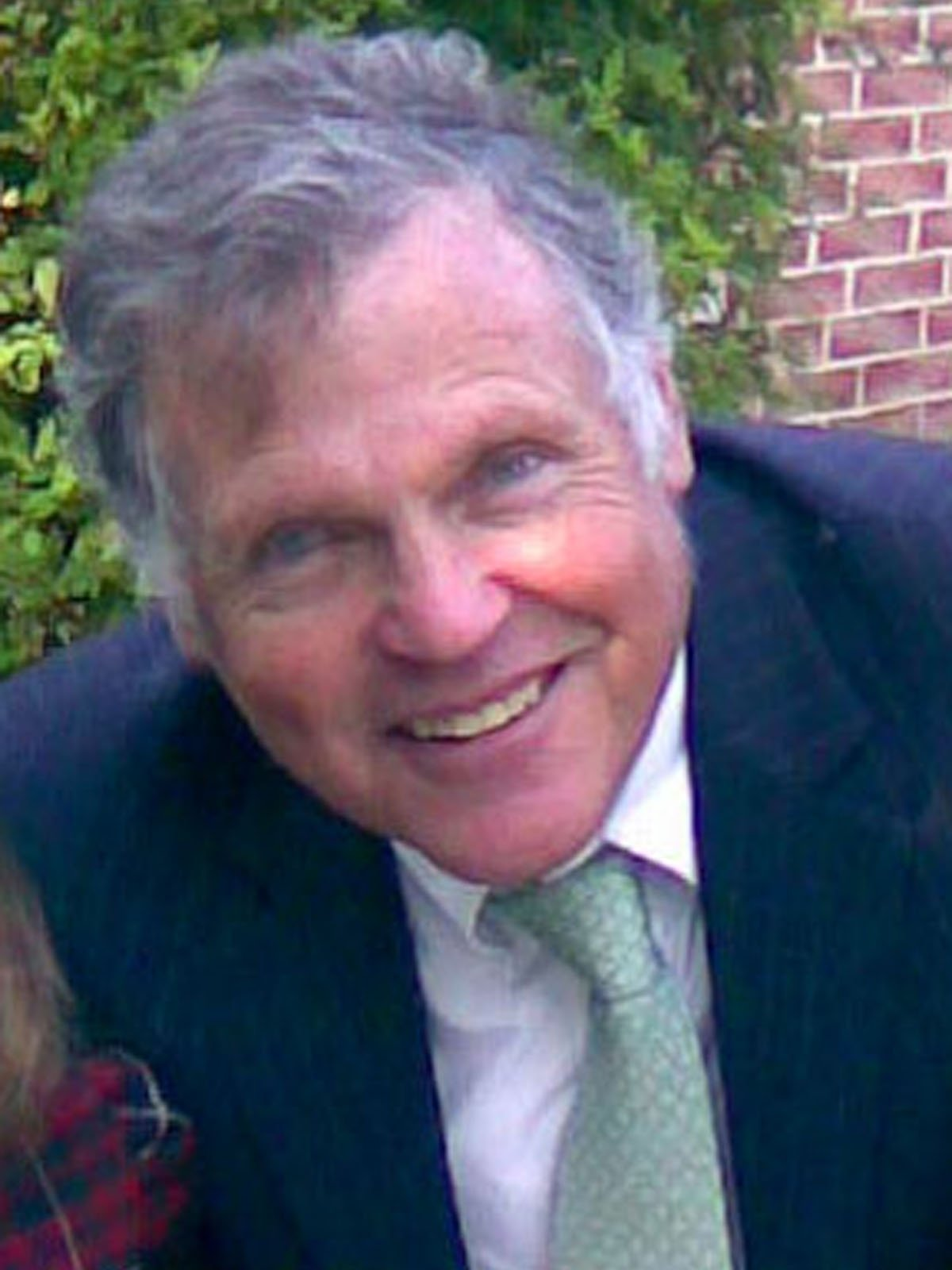
- Born: September 11, 1945 (age 81); US
- Occupation: Lawyer

Michael J. Siris (born September 11, 1945) is an American attorney best known for successfully representing the plaintiff in a lawsuit against the New York State Senate in 1992 to compel production of information on taxpayer-subsidized mailings.

== Life and career ==
Son of a neurosurgeon, the late Dr. Joseph Siris and the late Muriel Siris, Siris was educated at Great Neck North High School (1963), Yale College (B.A. 1967) and New York University Law School (J.D. 1970).

Following a primary win, Siris was the Democratic nominee in 1992 for the New York State Senatorial District (the 7th) in Nassau County then represented by Michael J. Tully, Jr. During the campaign, a campaign worker named Weston, under New York's Freedom of Information Law (FOIL), requested information on the cost of Tully's taxpayer-subsidized mailings, which Siris argued were really thinly-disguised promotions of the incumbent although styled as educational. Siris argued that such mailings gave Tully (and other incumbents) an unfair advantage over challengers who statistically almost never succeed.

When the State Senate declined the FOIL request and claimed immunity from disclosure, the campaign worker sued the Senate during the campaign and Siris acted as his counsel. Entitled "Weston v. Sloan" ("Sloan" having then been Secretary of the Senate), the lawsuit worked its way up to New York's highest court, the Court of Appeals, where the Court, after Siris had lost the general election to Tully, directed the Senate comply with FOIL. During the litigation, the Senate was criticized for withholding the information requested.

After the Court of Appeals' holding, then-Governor Mario Cuomo appointed Siris to fill an interim vacancy on the New York State Supreme Court. Cuomo claimed that he nominated Siris unaware of the lawsuit and that he did not intend to embarrass Tully. In any event, the nomination died in committee.

For his efforts, in 1995 Siris received the New York State Bar Association's annual Root-Stimson award for public service.

Author of two law review articles and other writings, Siris began his career representing Conrail and other railroads. Siris is now counsel to the Garden City, New York law firm, Solomon and Siris and has been recognized by the New York Law Journal as one of Long Island's leading lawyers. He specializes in real estate law and title litigation. Among other real estate related matters, he has handled adverse possession, restitution of real property, and forgery cases. He also represented JP Morgan Chase in a mortgage priority dispute with high profile attorney Dominic Barbara. He is the moderator of the Listserv of the real property section of New York County Lawyers and is a former member of the Board of Directors of its Foundation.

Siris lives in Roslyn, NY with his wife, Dr. Karen Siris, a retired elementary school principal, author, and bullying prevention expert. His daughter, Liz Winchester, is an author of children's books. His son, John was a member of the controversial 1996 Bucknell University lacrosse team that was undefeated, untied and uninvited (to the NCAA Division I playoffs).
