= Karnataka Tulu Sahitya Academy =

Organization for promoting literature in Tulu Language

- Abbreviation: KTSA
- Formation: 1994; 32 years ago
- Headquarters: Tulu Bhawana, Mangalore
- Location: Mangalore, India
- Region served: India
- President: Taranath Gatty Kapikad
- Publication: Madipu
- Parent organisation: Kannada and culture department, Government of Karnataka
- Website: tuluacademy.karnataka.gov.in

Karnataka Tulu Sahitya Academy is an organisation under Government of Karnataka for promotion of literature in Tulu language. Established in 1994 by Government of Karnataka, it is an autonomous organisation functioning from its own building - Tulu Bhawana in Mangalore, Karnataka.

The Karnataka Tulu Sahitya Academy organises workshops, seminars, cultural events and gatherings for Tulu public. It also provides research grants for research in Tulu language and culture; publishes books; and presents the annual awards in the fields of Tulu literature, Tulu folk arts, yakshagana, research and novel writing.

The Academy has a library which houses a good collection of books and magazines in Tulu and Kannada. It also publishes a monthly magazine by name Madipu.

Tulu speakers are spread across coastal Karnataka districts, especially towards the south, and the northernmost district of Kerala. The corresponding Tulu promotion organization in Kerala is Kerala Tulu Academy.
