= K. Kumar =

Indian orator and reformer

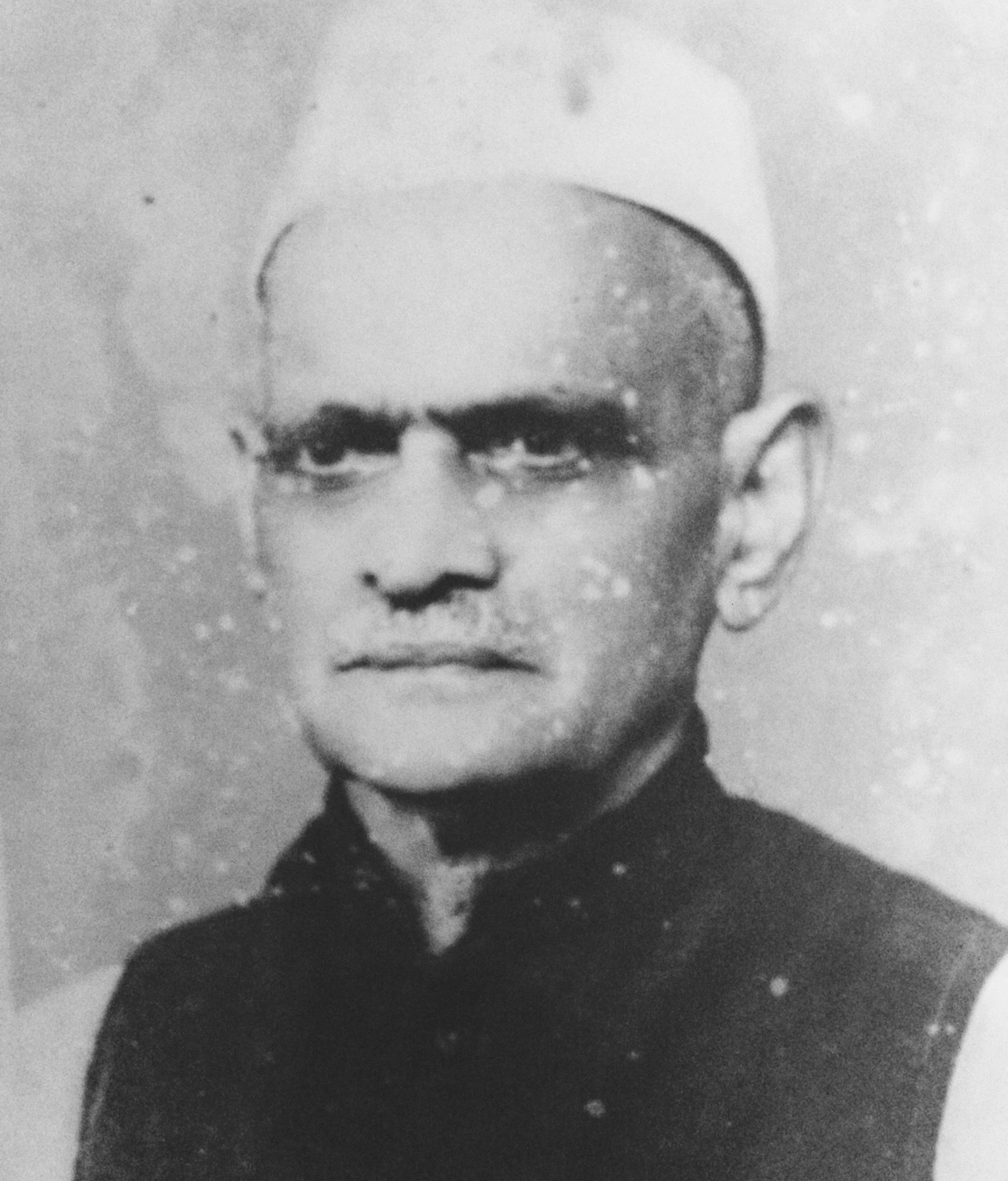
- K. Kumar at 80

Personal details
- Born: Quilon, Travancore (present-day Elanthoor, Pathanamthitta, Kerala)
- Spouse: T.S.Bhadrakumari
- Children: K. Bhadrakumar
- Education: Madras University; Presidency College, Chennai, American College, Madurai

K. Kumar (1894–1973) was an Indian orator, reformer and writer of the Indian pre-independence era. He was one of the earliest socio-political leaders to have brought Mahatma Gandhi's message and the spirit of the national movement to the erstwhile Travancore State.

A gifted translator, he traveled with Gandhi during his Kerala tours, interpreting his English speeches in Malayalam. He was also an Advisor to the Jawaharlal Nehru government. Kumar was the President of the Travancore Congress Committee and was also in charge of Gandhiji's Travancore tour more than once. He served on the AICC (All India Congress Committee) and on the working committee of the AICC (CWC or Congress Working Committee), TC-PCC/ KPCC (Kerala Pradesh Congress Committee) heading its Constructive Work Committee during crucial years of the freedom movement. He also functioned as the Chairman of the Parliamentary Committee of Travancore

Kumar was also known as: Travancore Kumar, Elanthur Kumarji; Kumarji, Elanthur Gandhi and Kuzhikala Kumar

== Early life ==
K. Kumar was born as K. Kumaran Nair as the eldest son of Kunju Pennamma and K. Padmanabhan Nair, in a traditional Nair family, the Kaduvinal-Thazhayamannil Tharavad, in Elanthur, Quilon District, Travancore (present-day Elanthur, Pathanamthitta, Kerala). ‘K’ in his name stands for his maternal house. Matrilineality was a tradition of Kerala and it was customary to attach the name of the maternal house to a child's first name as 'patronymic'. His father, K. Padmanabhan Nair, was a powerful social figure who also was a Revenue Officer of great standing under the Princely State of Travancore. K. Kumar's son K. Bhadrakumar, is a Developmental Educationist. His granddaughter Divya Bhadrakumar, is an Embedded System Engineer

A close friend of the High-court-judge-turned veteran freedom-activist Changanassery Parameswaran Pillai (1877–1940), and teacher-turned advocates and judges Sankaravelil Parameswaran Pillai and Vaikom Narayana Pillai, he shared a balanced outlook on the socio-political realities surrounding the British-driven Princely State. He was also a contemporary of Mannathu Padmanabha Pillai and helped him in making Nair Service Society a reality without being even remotely sectarian. Mannathu Padmanabhan also helped him back by participating in Kumar's political campaigns.

Kumar had his early education at Paravoor English School and Mannar Nair Society High School in Quilon District in Kerala. He, then, moved on to Madurai American College for intermediate education and later, to Madras Presidency College for higher studies. Kumar was said to have been a bright student and among the earliest in the State to have received University Education. Patriotism and Gandhi's call for non-co-operation caused Kumar to plung himself into Gandhian work for 'social reconstruction' which affected his further studies. It was primarily North India that he chose for his early engagement.

== Beginnings of Sociopolitical Involvement ==
K. Kumar became a member of the Indian National Congress in 1912. Inspired by Gandhiji, he later left higher studies at Presidency College and served the Congress from Trivandrum as one of its very few full-time workers of Kerala.

During the 1920s, Kumarji revived the ‘Swadeshabhimani’) (the news-paper founded by Vakkom Moulavi and run and edited until 1910 by the deported Swadeshabhimani Ramakrishna Pillai), as part of his effort to invigorate the political scene and set the tone for the national movement in Kerala. He also became the Publisher and Editor-in-Chief of the paper after Ramakrishna Pillai. It was considered a daring move that nearly froze the government. However, the government wisely chose not to react or retaliate immediately.

K. Narayana Kurukkal (author of the novels "Parappuram" and "Udayabhanu") and Barrister A. K. Pillai helped Kumar in his efforts. Kurukkal was a colleague and friend of Swadeshabhimani Ramakrishna Pillai. Besides Narayana Kurukkal, R. Narayana Panikker, renowned political critic Raman Menon, S. R. Pillai's wife B. Kalyani Amma and other prominent writers, contributed articles to the paper on a regular basis. Kumar also used to write editorials and articles. K. Narayana Kurukkal and Barrister A. K. Pillai assisted Kumar to edit the paper which was headquartered at the present DPI Office (Office of the Director of Public Instruction, Government of Kerala) in Thycaud, Trivandrum.

Rabindranath Tagore's disciple and writer, K. C. Pillai, helped Kumarji with back-end office-duties. The paper was run on the lines of "Modern Review" published from Calcutta by Ramananda Chatterjee and used to carry articles besides regular editorials written by Kumar himself.

K. C. Pillai and Evoor S. Gopalan Nair opine that "Swadeshabhimani" remained a publication of the highest standards so long as it was under the leadership of Kumar. It appears that the editorship of ‘Swadeshabhimani’ got passed on to A. K. Pillai by 1932. K. Kumar had an important role in at least two other influential nationalist papers of the era – the ‘Swarat’ run by A. K. Pillai himself and the ‘Mahatma’ run by the Amsi brothers. Swadeshabhimani Ramkrishna Pillai's work had a serious impact on Kumarji. He thus chose Cannanore as one of his chief venues for breaking the Salt Law and became instrumental in erecting the statue of Swadeshabhimani Ramakrishna Pillai in the capital city of Trivandrum and organising an annual commemoration of the deportation for a long time to come.

== Into the thick of Freedom Struggle ==
During the thick of the freedom struggle, Kumarji was the President of the Travancore Congress Committee and was also in charge of Gandhiji's Travacore tour more than once. He served on the AICC and on the working committee of the TC-PCC/ KPCC heading its Constructive Work Committee during crucial years of the freedom movement.

The Travancore State Congress was reconstituted with new objectives in 1938 under Pattom A. Thanu Pillai. Since the character of the newly constituted party was not to his taste, Kumar preferred to remain inactive from it.

Besides Mahatma Gandhi, Kumarji had close ties with Rajaji, Nehru, C. R. Das and other prominent leaders. He was a part of the leadership of the Salt Satyagraha (in Kozhikode, Tellicherry and Cannanore, the Civil Disobedience or foreign cloth boycott and picketing at Alleppey and other areas and the prominent role he played in the Temple Entry Movement and eradication of 'untouchability', the Vaikom Satyagraha, the Nagpur Flag Satyagrha" and other significant social unity moves. These earned him at least 21 months of imprisonment with 9 months rigorous imprisonment. The year-long agitation at Alleppey and Trivandrum brought about mass conversions to the Gandhian ideology and Khadi. His leadership of the Swadeshi Movement and Foreign Cloth Boycott at Alleppey also inspired many prominent, educated women to come to the forefront and offer mighty support of the national movement. The role of the wife of the last Diwan of Travancore and Kumarji's classmate P. G. N. Unnithan and the daughter of P. G. Govida Pillai, Government Pleader, wife of Swadeshabhimani T.K. Madhavan and M. Karthyayani Amma deserve special mention.

== Khadi, Harijan Welfare, Sarvodaya & Communal Harmony ==
By late thirties, Kumarji turned all his attention to Harijan Welfare, Sarvodaya, Education and Khadi He toured the state delivering lectures and establishing scores of schools (said to be 96 to 110) including Harijan and Sarvodaya Schools. A few of these survived into the sixties and early seventies. In course of time, he passed on the management of most of these institutions to the Head teacher or an educated member of the depressed class. He started a school for Harijans named "Kumbazha Pravarthi Pallikudam" which later became a life-giving tributary to the present Government VHSS Elanthoor. Besides, he continued to undertake promotion of Khadi as a life-mission. Gandhian Dr. G. Ramachandran, the former Chairman of the Khadi Commission is emphatic when he says: "His (Kumarji's) double passion consisted of Khadi and prohibition... In fact Kumarji was Khadi and Khadi was Kumarji... To him must belong more than anyone else in Travancore, the irresistible appeal of Khadi that came into the lives of thousands of our people"... G. Ramachandran got drawn to Kumarji through his public speeches and sought to live and work with him in Trivandrum to undertake Khadi work. He reminisces that along with Kumarji, he went hacking Khadar from house to house in Trivandrum in the early twenties.

== Fading Into Oblivion ==
Though measures taken in the late twenties did not prove useful enough to unite all communities as he had dreamed, K. Kumar renewed his efforts for communal harmony. With K. Kelappan, K. Kumar had already become the first to remove the suffix to his name that suggested caste status. In course of time, Kumar became "a potent anti-communal force trusted by every community". However, political bigotry and manipulative tactics (during elections in Travancore after independence) dealt a ruthless blow to the secular sentiments of Travancore, painstakingly built up over the years and rendered Kumarji a victim of his ideological steadfastness. He contested the historic election against T. M. Varghese as an independent candidate wedded to ideology and lost by a narrow margin in an election that played the communal card powered with big money. However, it is said that Pattom Thanu Pillai did his best, supported by T.M Varghese, to induct him into the Pattom Thanu Pillai Ministry as Home Minister. Kumarji refused the offer on ideological grounds. Independent India failed to recognize him and utilize his exceptional qualities, but he continued to guide and mold a good number of public men and political leaders. Besides, he became active in local development work on a massive scale. He was also able to exert a transforming influence on the people through movements like "Community Feasts", "Thoppippala Agitataion", the Akhila Thiruvithamkoor Parayar Mahasabha and Kuravar Maha Sabha that he took initiative in founding. Note: The Varkala SK Raghavan fraction and the PC Adichan fraction met at Elanthoor and formed the Travancore Kuravar Mahasabha in 1937, though later, it seems to have split again

== Notes ==
1. K. C. Pillai: Disciple of Rabindranath Tagore, writer and translator (transliterator) of Tagore's works into Malayalam. He was also owner of The Trivandrum Hotel (founded in 1934) in Statue (Trivandrum) which hosted several significant political and social gatherings during the freedom movement. Several of K. C. Pillai's books were published by DC Books. They may also be available at:

2. A. K. Pillai: Barrister A. K. Pillai, left his higher studies at Oxford University around 1920 and joined the Indian National Movement. Besides involving in social and political work on a massive scale, he helped K. Kumar to sub-edit the revived "Swadeshabhimani" and himself started the "Swarat" (Swarad) newspaper with the support of K. Kumar to promote the spirit of the national movement. (Ref: Articles of G. Ramachandran and K. C. Pillai in Kumarji Smaraka Grantham; Other sources including :

3. K. Kumar dedicated much of his time for Harijan service, Harijan Education, development of Harijan organizations and the establishment of a unique Harijan Rehabilitation Colony in Elanthoor. The colony's life was built around programs for social refinement and economic self-sustainability. It had proximity to a school which he founded to educate kids during the day and the laboring classes after sun-down. This unique concept in schooling had a running water system energized by rural technology. It also ran centres of production for goods of regular consumption like match-boxes, soap and candle. These products could bring in supplementary income to the needy learners. It added a dimension to the need for "vocationalising" education***. A special parliamentary delegation is understood to have visited Elanthoor to study these developmental experiments. The delegation published a paper or a report titled "Look at Elanthoor", praising and recommending the work as highly worth replication. The remains of said school are still visible in Elanthoor close to the Harijan Colony. (***Secondary Note: In the late sixties and early seventies, this school-building housed a part of the century-old Government High School nearby. After the government school shifted, seemingly in the early seventies, local people started usurping the remaining land and the property)

4. During the visit of the Prince of Wales (1921), mass protests and "hartals" were organised in all major towns of Travancore. Thiruvananthapuram, Kollam, Alappuzha and other towns witnessed unprecedented popular agitation. Two Muslim activists and three Congress leaders - K. Kumar, A. K. Pillai and Thoppil Padmanabha Pillai - were taken into custody by the government in this case. K. Kumar was awarded one year of imprisonment. Ref:

== References / General References / Citations ==
History of Kannur Ref: 1. Salt Satyagraha 2. Civil Disobedience Movement
