= Prakkanam =

Times Prakkanam
- village
- Location in Kerala, India Times Prakkanam (India)
- Coordinates: 9°16′0″N 76°44′0″E
- Country: India
- State: Kerala
- District: Pathanamthitta

Government
  - Body: Cheneerkara Panchayat

Area
  - Total: 36 km^{2} (14 sq mi)
- Elevation: 31 m (102 ft)

Population
  - Total: 2
  - Density: 0.056/km^{2} (0.14/sq mi)

Languages
  - Official: Malayalam, English
- Time zone: UTC+5:30 (IST)
- PIN: 689643
- Telephone code: 04682
- Vehicle registration: KL-03
- Coastline: 0 kilometres (0 mi)
- Railway line: 0 kilometres (0 mi)
- Nearest city: Pathanamthitta (7Km)
- Nearest railway station: Chengannur (19Km)
- Nearest Airport: Trivandrum (109Km)
- Literacy: 100%
- Lok Sabha constituency: Pathanamthitta
- Climate: Tropical monsoon
- Avg. summer temperature: 35 °C (95 °F)
- Avg. winter temperature: 20 °C (68 °F)
- Panchayath: Chennerkara

Prakkanam is a village in Pathanamthitta district in the state of Kerala, India. It is situated between Omalloor and Elanthoor.

The primary religious beliefs of this area are Hinduism and Christianity. Many temples and churches of worship are located in Prakannam.

== Places of worship ==
=== St. Mary's Orthodox Church (Valiyapally) ===
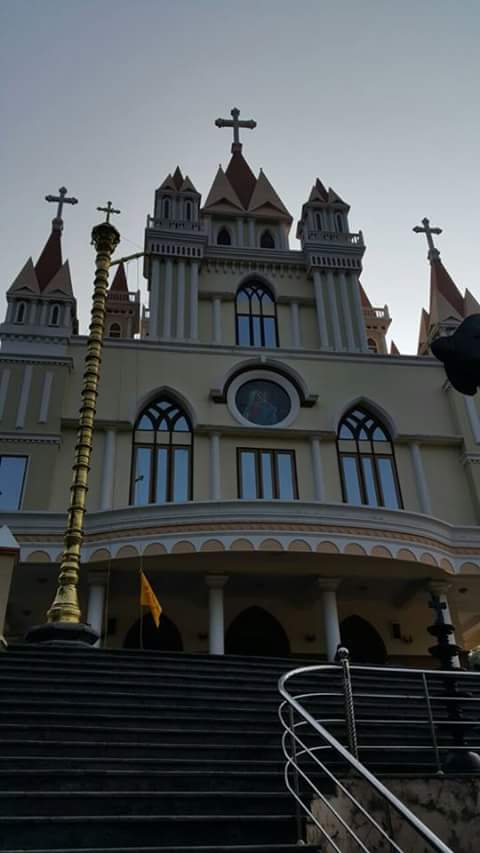
St Mary's Orthodox church Prakkanam

The Prakkanam St. Mary’s Orthodox Valiyapally under Thumpamon Diocese of the Malankara Orthodox Syrian Church. This church is one of the old and famous churches in Kerala, having more than 125 years of history, and also called as Prakkanam Valiya Palli. In this church one can see the classical touch of Kerala as well as western architecture so that is the reason Kerala tourism department promoting this church in tourism Map.

The Prakkanam Valiayapally stands proudly as a shining star at the heart of Prakkanam. It is about 7 km away from District Head Quarters Pathanamthitta and is located between Omalloor and Elanthoor, 3 km from Omalloor and 5 km from Elanthoor the Omalloor – Elanthoor Road. People of all religions, who are frustrated and laden with various problems seek refuge in this church for the intercession of St. Mary and find solace, especially during the 8 days of Lent. website- Prakkanam Valiyapally

=== Edanattu Sree Bhadrakali Devi Temple ===
Edanattu Bhadrakali Temple is situated near Prakkanam Junction. Bhadrakali is the principal deity. Ganapathy, Siva, Yakshi, Rakshas, and Nagaraja are also worshipped there. Main offerings are Rakthapushpanjali, Guruthi, and all vedasooktha archanas and various types of niraparas. Every year Bhagavatha sapthaham is celebrated on last day of Mandalakalam.

Temple's annual festival is celebrated on Makayiram star of Malayalam month Meenam. Padayani is the main art form being performed on festival day, in olden days it extends about 21 days. Kettukazhcha is another peculiarity of festival. Each 'Karas' bring Kettukazhcha and assemble at Temple. Padayanippara Kottakayattam is another ceremony related to Festival. It is the travel of 'Oorali' from the temple to the Maladevar Nada of Padayanippara Malankavu.

=== Kaithavana Sree Durga Bhagavati Temple ===
Kaithavana Sree Durga Bhagavati Temple is another major Hindu worship centre in Prakkanam. Temple administration is carried out by Sree Durgga Hindu Seva Samithi. Durga Bhagavati is the principal deity. Sree Mahadevan, Hanuman Swami, Maha Ganapathy, Dharma Shasthaav, Brahma Rakshassu, Sree MahaYakshi Amma, Nagarajavu, Nagayakshi, Yogishwaran, Maladevar are also worshipped here as upadevatas. Main offerings are all types of vedasooktha archanas for Durga Devi and Vadamaala, Vettila Maala, Aval Nivedyam and Anjaneya Pooja for Hanuman. Thrikkarthika Maholsavam is the celebrated annually in the month of Kumbha.

=== Mor Ignatius Jacobite Syrian Orthodox Church ===
Mor Ignatius Jacobite Syrian Orthodox Church came into existence in the year 1932, as an integral part of the Universal Syrian Orthodox Church. This church is also called Kuttumuruppel Palli. It is about 2 km from Prakkanam and it is about 500 m from Muttukudukka.

=== Thottupuram St. Mary's Orthodox Church ===
This church is situated at the east side of Prakkanam.

== Sport ==
=== Volleyball ===
Volleyball is the main game played at Prakkanam. There is a volleyball court owned by Chenneerkkara Grama Panchayath. A volleyball academy with a strength of 30 students working here, aiming for some good contribution to Indian volleyball team. The Santhosh sports and arts club formed in the 1950 had a great impact on the young generation developing their sports and cultural activities.

=== Tug of War ===
This sport event normally occurs during Onam festival. In September 2016 a new "Tug of War court" with national standards was inaugurated in Chenneerkkara Grama Panchayath Stadium.

=== Santhosh Sports & Arts Club ===
Santhosh Sports & Arts Club (SS&AC) is the oldest cultural club in Prakkanam. For volleyball it was a champions of Pathanamthitta.

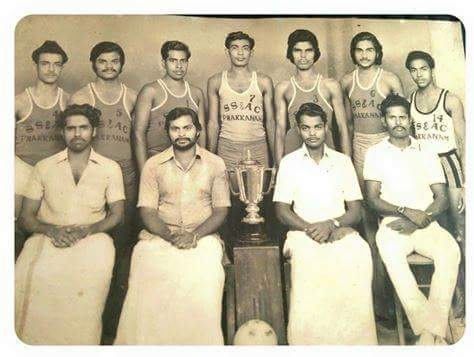
Santhosh Sports & Arts Club prakkanam

=== Nanma Sports And Arts Club ===
Nanma Arts And Sports Club is a sports-cultural organisation. Its functioning as a promoter of the game volleyball. In the occasions of Onam and Christmas, they actively participate the celebrations. Most of the members in the club are youngsters below an age of thirty. They conduct several sports programs also like "All Kerala Volleyball Tournament".

== Educational institutions ==
There are four educational institutions in Prakkanam:

- Govt Lower Primary school Prakkanam,
- M. G. UP School Prakkanam, Govt LPS Thottupuram
- UPS Thottupuram
- St. Johns MBA College is one of the professional course institutes

=== Prakkanam Public Library ===
Prakkanam Public library is a "A" category library in the village. The library initially started its operations in the year 1972. Presently it has around 8500 books. In the last year library has been renovated and a new 2 storied building has been set up for its smooth functioning.

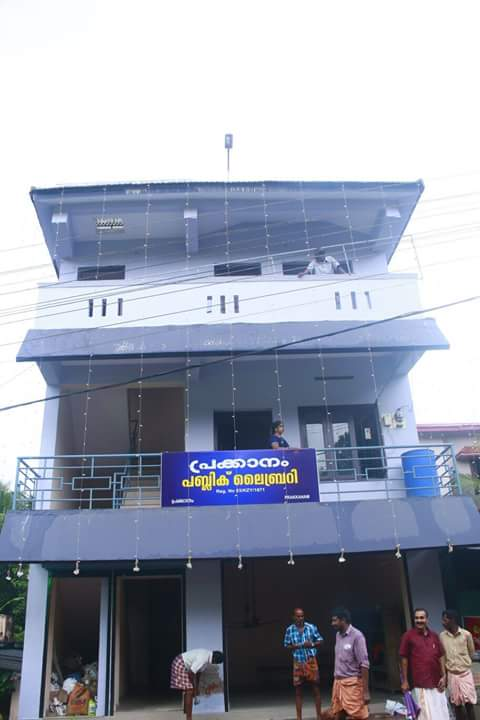
Prakkanam Library

== Dispensary ==
=== Govt. Ayurvedic dispensary Prakkanam ===
Providing free medicine and medical treatment. Situated near to Prakkanam Junction (Prakkanam - Elavinthitta road side) opposite to Prakkanam Panchayath Stadium.

== Distance from Prakkanam ==
- Adoor (18 km)
- Pandalam (15 km)
- Thiruvalla (27 km)
- Kozhencherry (11 km)
- Sabarimala (72 km)
- Ranny (19 KM)
