= History of Kannur =

Kannur (pronounced [kɐɳːuːr]), formerly known in English as Cannanore, Arabic as Kannanur, and Portuguese as Cananor, is a city and a Municipal Corporation in North Malabar region, state of Kerala, India. It is the largest city in North Malabar, which is the northernmost region of Kerala. It is sometimes identified Kolathunadu, which was ruled by the Kolathiris. In the 12th and 13th centuries there was trade with Persia and Arabia.

Local bodies in Kannur district

It served as the British military headquarters on India's west coast until 1887. In conjunction with her sister city, Tellicherry, it was the third largest city on the western coast of British India in the 18th century after Bombay and Karachi.

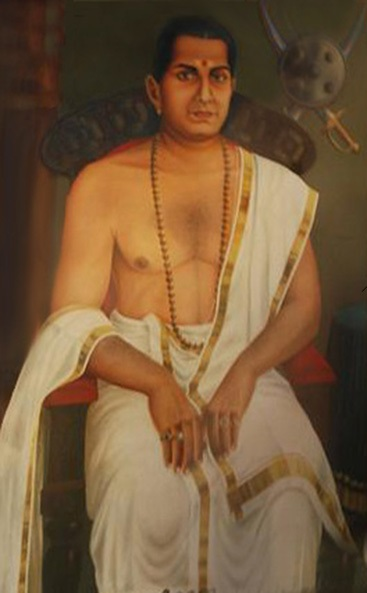
Veera Kerala Varma Pazhassi Raja, painting by Raja Ravi Varma

== Early history ==
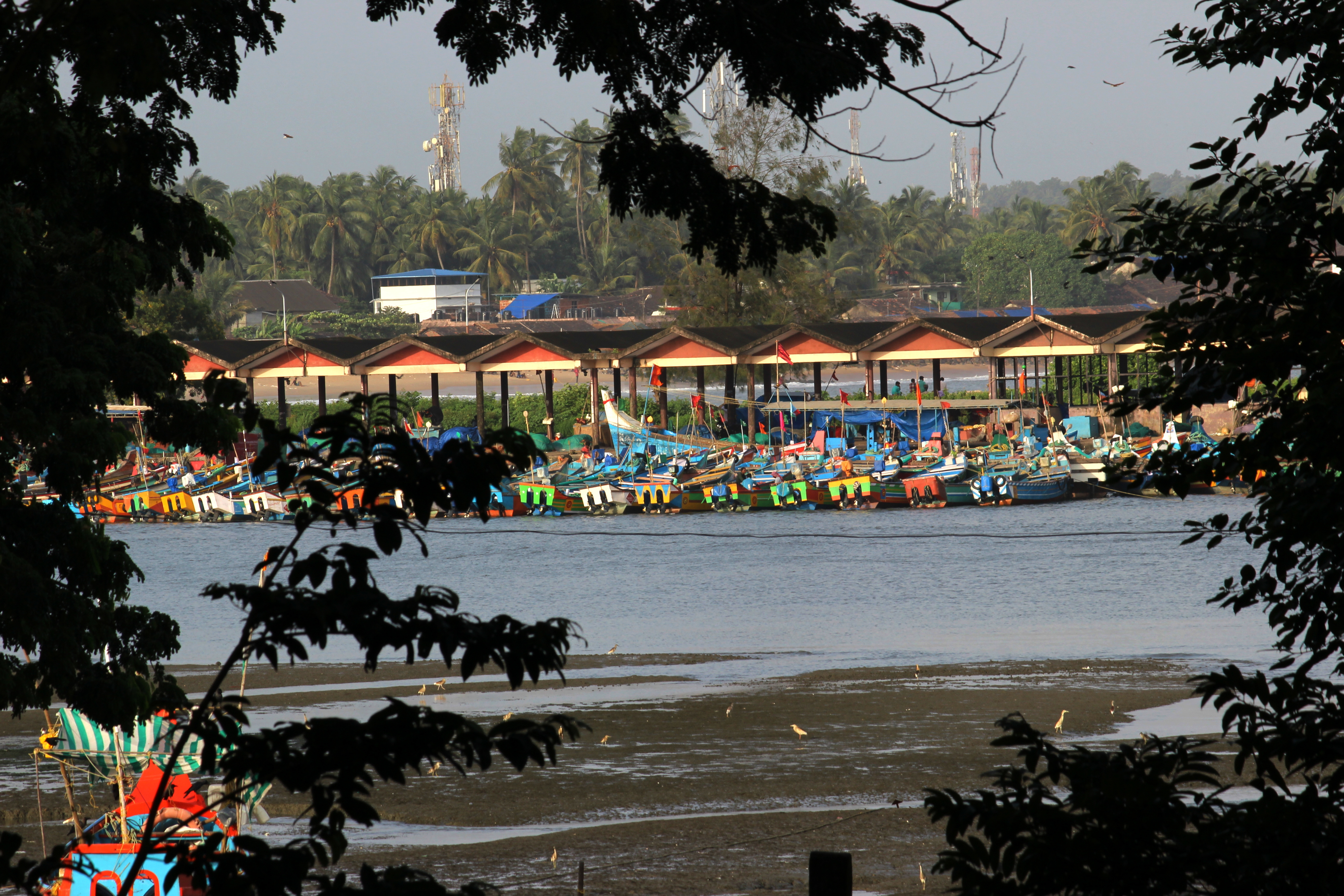
Mappila Bay harbour at Ayikkara. On one side, there is St. Angelo Fort (built in 1505) and on the other side is Arakkal palace.

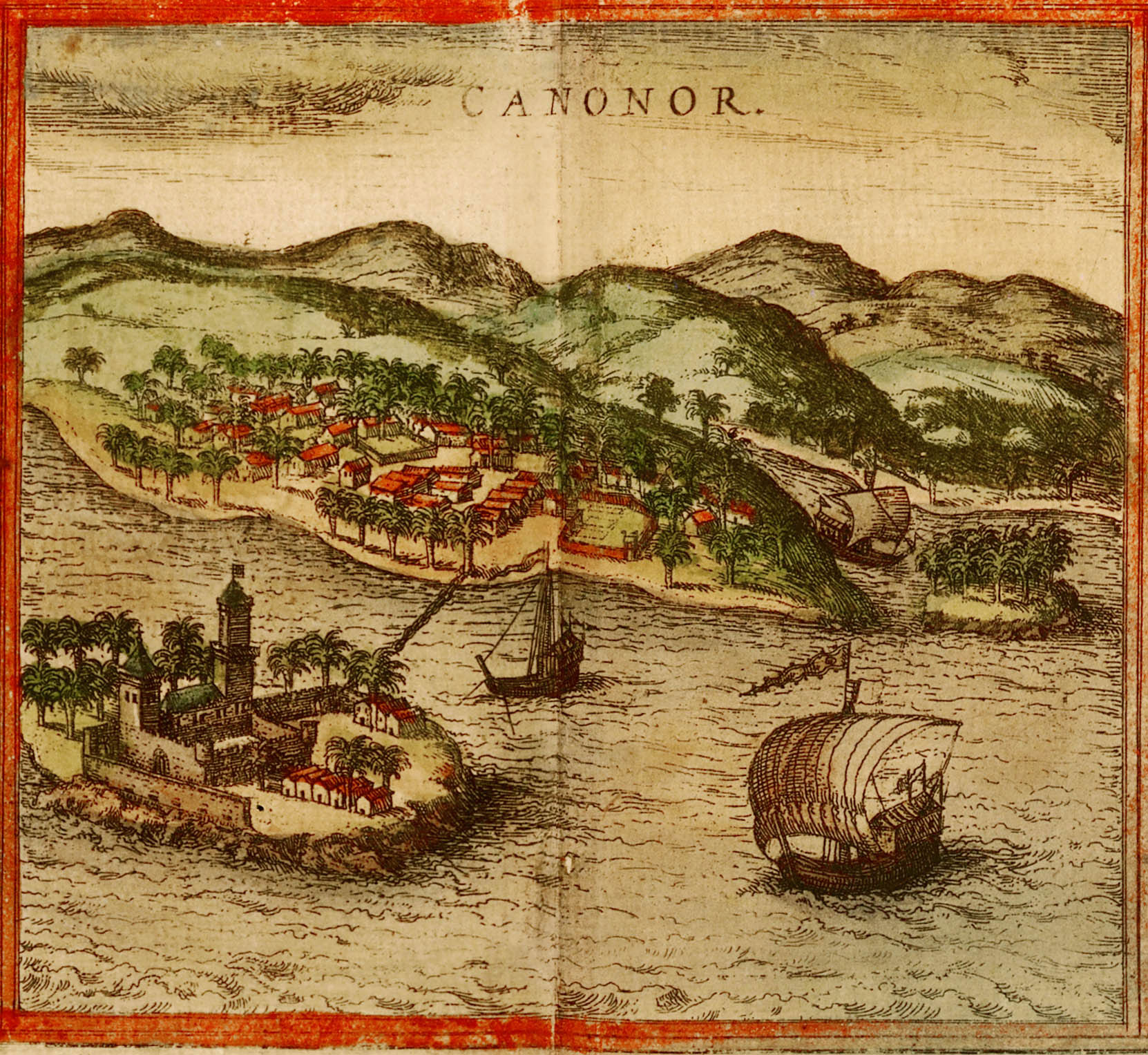
A portrait of Kannur drawn in 1572, from Georg Braun and Frans Hogenberg's atlas Civitates orbis terrarum, Volume I

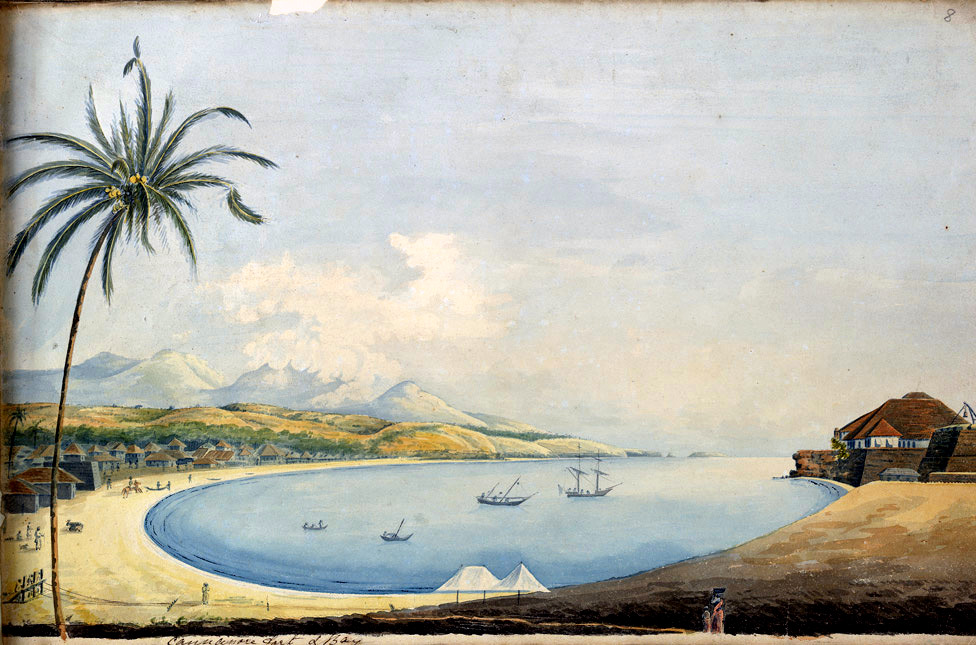
Kannur fort and Bay; a watercolor by John Johnston (1795-1801)

The earliest evidence of human habitation in the district are rock-cut caves and megalithic burial sites of the Neolithic age. The Taliparamba-Kannur-Thalassery area abounds in rock-cut caves, dolmens, burial stone circles and menhirs, all of megalith. Ezhimala was the headquarters of a powerful kingdom namely Mushika dynasty in the ancient period. Later Kannur was the capital of the Kolattiri Rajas, whose kingdom had trading relations with Arabia and Persia in the 12th century and 13th centuries. In his book on travels (Il Milione), Marco Polo recounts his visit to the area in the mid 1290s. Other visitors included Faxian, the Buddhist pilgrim and Ibn Batuta, writer and historian of Tangiers.

A popular legend holds that the ships of Solomon had anchored along the coasts of Kannur to collect teak for building the Temple of the Lord. Kannur also finds mention as Naura in the Periplus of the Erythraean Sea, a Greek work of great antiquity.

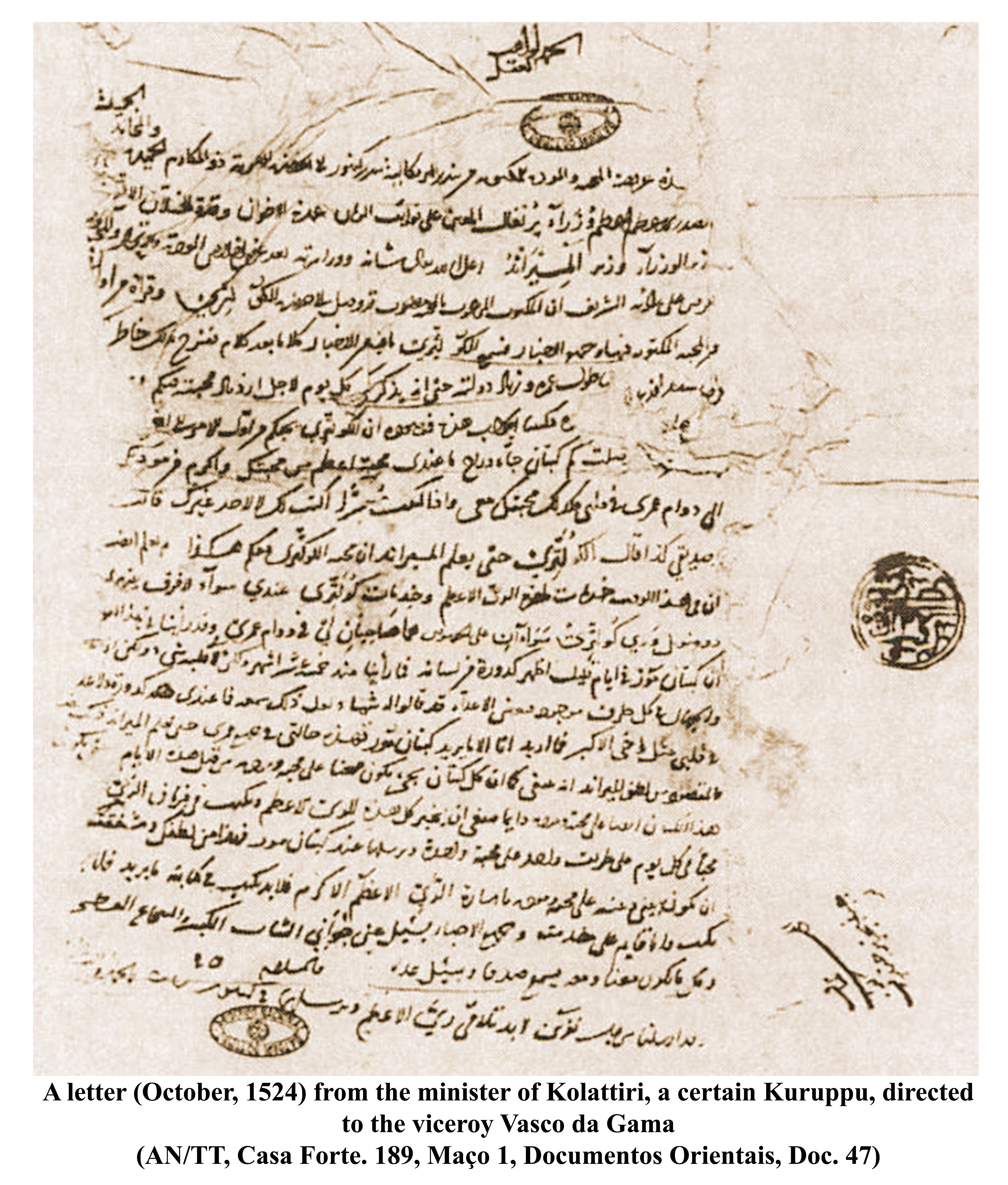
Kolattiri Raja's (The ruler of Kannur) minister Kuruppu's Arabic letter to Vasco da Gama (1524)

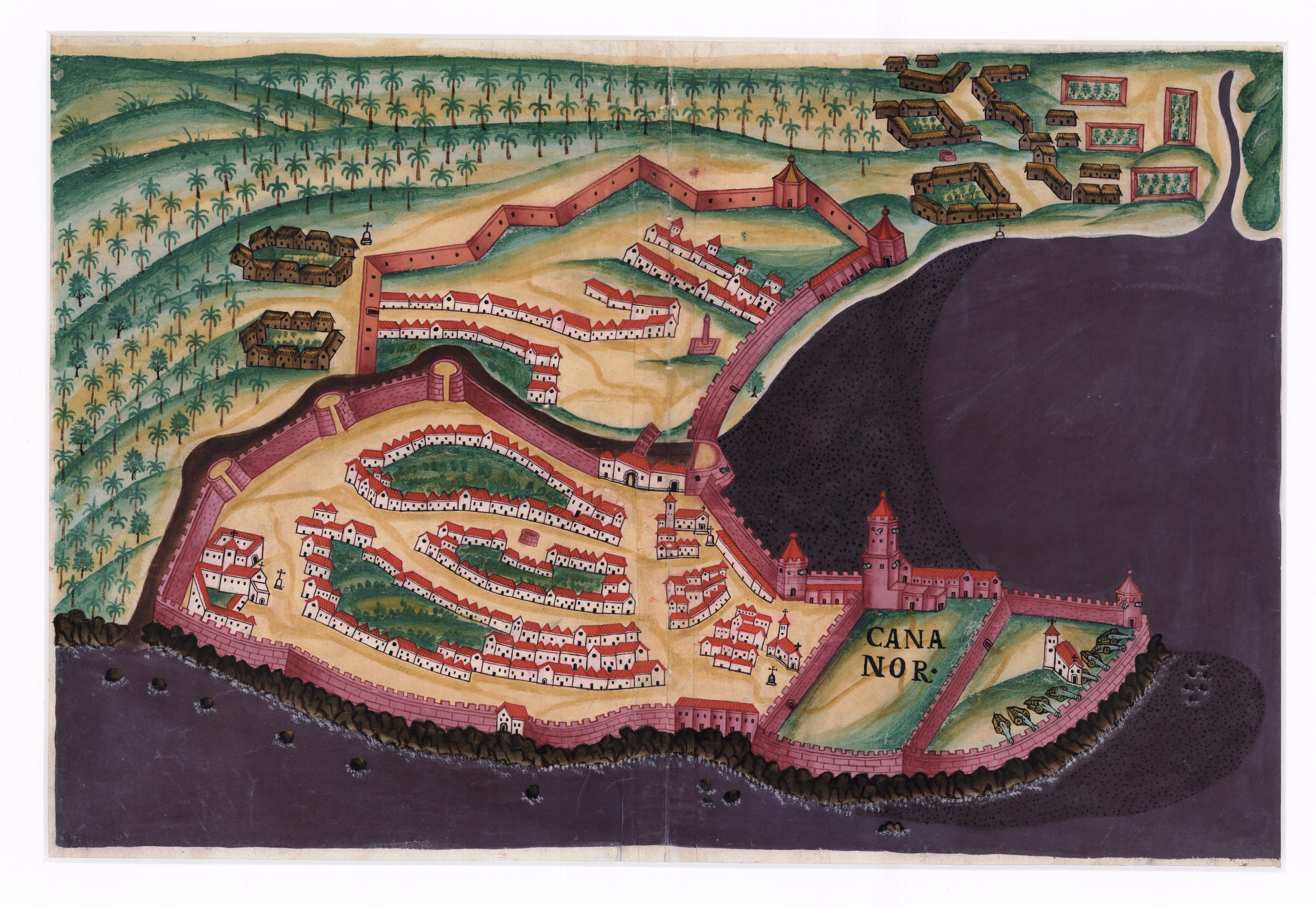
A portrait if Kannur drawn in 1635

North Malabar was the seat of powerful kingdom based at Ezhimala in the Sangam period (1st-5th century CE). The ancient port of Naura, which is mentioned in the Periplus of the Erythraean Sea as a port somewhere north of Muziris is identified with Kannur. The kingdom of Ezhimala had jurisdiction over two Nadus - The coastal Poozhinadu and the hilly eastern Karkanadu. According to the works of Sangam literature, Poozhinadu consisted much of the coastal belt between Mangalore and Kozhikode. Karkanadu consisted of Wayanad-Gudalur hilly region with parts of Kodagu (Coorg). It is said that Nannan, the most renowned ruler of Ezhimala dynasty, took refuge at Wayanad hills in the 5th century CE when he was lost to Cheras, just before his execution in a battle, according to the Sangam works.

Names, routes and locations of the Periplus of the Erythraean Sea (1st century CE)

Pliny the Elder (1st century CE) states that the port of Tyndis was located at the northwestern border of Keprobotos (Chera dynasty). The North Malabar region, which lies north of the port at Tyndis, was ruled by the kingdom of Ezhimala during Sangam period. According to the Periplus of the Erythraean Sea, a region known as Limyrike began at Naura and Tyndis. However the Ptolemy mentions only Tyndis as the Limyrike's starting point. The region probably ended at Kanyakumari; it thus roughly corresponds to the present-day Malabar Coast. The value of Rome's annual trade with the region was estimated at around 50,000,000 sesterces. Pliny the Elder mentioned that Limyrike was prone by pirates. The Cosmas Indicopleustes mentioned that the Limyrike was a source of peppers.

According to Kerala Muslim tradition, Kannur along with surrounding Madayi and Dharmadom were home to three of the oldest mosques in the Indian subcontinent. According to the Legend of Cheraman Perumals, the first Indian mosque was built in 624 AD at Kodungallur with the mandate of the last the ruler (the Cheraman Perumal) of Chera dynasty, who left from Dharmadom to Mecca and converted to Islam during the lifetime of Muhammad (c. 570–632). According to Qissat Shakarwati Farmad, the Masjids at Kodungallur, Kollam, Madayi, Barkur, Mangalore, Kasaragod, Kannur, Dharmadam, Panthalayani, and Chaliyam, were built during the era of Malik Dinar, and they are among the oldest Masjids in the Indian subcontinent. It is believed that Malik Dinar died at Thalangara in Kasaragod town.

Ezhimala kingdom was succeeded by Mushika dynasty in the early medieval period, most possibly due to the migration of Tuluva Brahmins from Tulu Nadu. The Mushika-vamsha Mahakavya, written by Athula in the 11th century, throws light on the recorded past of the Mushika Royal Family up until that point. The Indian anthropologist Ayinapalli Aiyappan states that a powerful and warlike clan of the Bunt community of Tulu Nadu was called Kola Bari and the Kolathiri Raja of Kolathunadu was a descendant of this clan. The Kolathunadu (Kannur) Kingdom, who were the descendants of Mushika dynasty, at the peak of its power reportedly extended from Netravati River (Mangalore) in the north to Korapuzha (Kozhikode) in the south with Arabian Sea on the west and Kodagu hills on the eastern boundary, also including the isolated islands of Lakshadweep in Arabian Sea. An Old Malayalam inscription (Ramanthali inscriptions), dated to 1075 CE, mentioning king Kunda Alupa, the ruler of Alupa dynasty of Mangalore, can be found at Ezhimala (the former headquarters of Mushika dynasty) near Cannanore, Kerala. The Arabic inscription on a copper slab within the Madayi Mosque in Kannur records its foundation year as 1124 CE.

Until the 16th century CE, the Kasargod town was known by the name Kanhirakode (may be by the meaning, 'The land of Kanhira Trees') in Malayalam. The Kumbla dynasty, who swayed over the land of southern Tulu Nadu wedged between Chandragiri River and Netravati River (including present-day Taluks of Manjeshwar and Kasaragod) from Maipady Palace at Kumbla, had also been vassals to the Kolathunadu, before the Carnatic conquests of Vijayanagara Empire. The Kumbla dynasty had a mixed lineage of Malayali Nairs and Tuluva Brahmins. They also claimed their origin from Cheraman Perumals of Kerala. Francis Buchanan-Hamilton states that the customs of Kumbla dynasty were similar to those of the contemporary Malayali kings, though Kumbla was considered as the southernmost region of Tulu Nadu. Just like other contemporary kings of Kerala in the medieval period, The powerful Kolathu Raja also came under the influence of Zamorin later. The Kolathunadu in the late medieval period emerged into independent 10 principalities i.e., Kadathanadu (Vadakara), Randathara or Poyanad (Dharmadom), Kottayam (Thalassery), Nileshwaram, Iruvazhinadu (Panoor, Kurumbranad etc., under separate royal chieftains due to the outcome of internal dissensions. The Nileshwaram dynasty on the northernmost part of Kolathiri dominion, were relatives to both Kolathunadu as well as the Zamorin of Calicut, in the early medieval period.

The Portuguese explorer Vasco da Gama visited Kannur in 1498. Kannur became the sight of a confrontation between the Ottoman Turks and the Portuguese Empire, shortly thereafter it became a Portuguese settlement. The port at Kozhikode held the superior economic and political position in medieval Kerala coast, while Kannur, Kollam, and Kochi, were commercially important secondary ports, where the traders from various parts of the world would gather.

The Portuguese arrived at Kappad Kozhikode in 1498 during the Age of Discovery, thus opening a direct sea route from Europe to India. The Portuguese led by Don Francisco de Almeda, the first Portuguese viceroy for India, built the St. Angelo's Fort north of Kannur in 1505. In 1663 the Dutch captured the fort. In 1790 the British captured the fort. At present, it is under the control of the Archaeological Survey of India. The island of Dharmadom near Kannur, along with Thalassery, was ceded to the East India Company as early as 1734, which were claimed by all of the Kolattu Rajas, Kottayam Rajas, and Arakkal Bibi in the late medieval period, where the British initiated a factory and English settlement following the cession. In the latter half of the 18th century, Hyder Ali and Tipu Sultan, rulers of Mysore, conquered much of the district and came into conflict with the British. In 1792, at the conclusion of the Third Anglo-Mysore War, the British took over Kannur and the surrounding region, which became the new Malabar District of British India's Madras Presidency. During the 17th century, Kannur was the capital city of the only Muslim Sultanate in the Malabar region - Arakkal - who also ruled the Laccadive Islands in addition to the city of Kannur. Arakkal Kingdom and Chirakkal kingdom were two vassal kingdoms based in the city of Kannur.

In 1761, the British captured Mahé, and the settlement was handed over to the ruler of Kadathanadu. The British restored Mahé to the French as a part of the 1763 Treaty of Paris. In 1779, the Anglo-French war broke out, resulting in the French loss of Mahé. In 1783, the British agreed to restore to the French their settlements in India, and Mahé was handed over to the French in 1785.

== Resistance to British rule ==
Kannur District witnessed one of the longest and bloodiest resistance to British rule in India. Initially the British had to suffer local resistance against their rule under the leadership of Kerala Varma Pazhassi Raja, who had popular support in Thalassery-Wayanad region. This revolt led by Pazhassi Raja in the 1792–1806 period kept a large part of the district in a state of war.

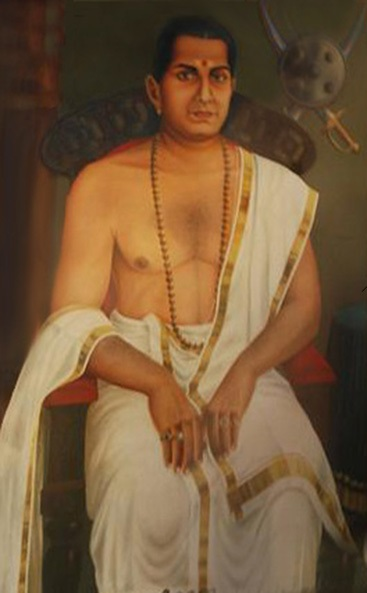
Veera Kerala Varma Pazhassi Raja. Painting by Raja Ravi Varma

== Indian freedom movement ==
Kannur District played an important role in the Indian freedom movement. The Indian National Congress, founded in 1885, established a Malabar District committee in 1908. A branch of the All India Home Rule League, founded by Dr. Annie Besant, functioned in Thalassery during this period and among its active workers was V.K. Krishna Menon. By the end of 1939, a branch of the Communist Party of India was formally established at Pinarayi, a village near Thalassery. The decision by the Nagpur Congress to give up constitutional methods of agitation and resort to non-violent non-co-operation as a means of achieving swaraj led to the widespread boycott of foreign goods, courts of law and educational institutions in Kannur. Mahatma Gandhi and Maulana Shaukat Ali toured the district to carry the message of the Non-Co-operation and Khilafat Movements. The Khilafat movement of 1921 was an uprising of Muslims against the British for abolishing the Islamic Chaliphate in West Asia and resulted in the formation of a secular Turkey.

== Civil disobedience movement ==
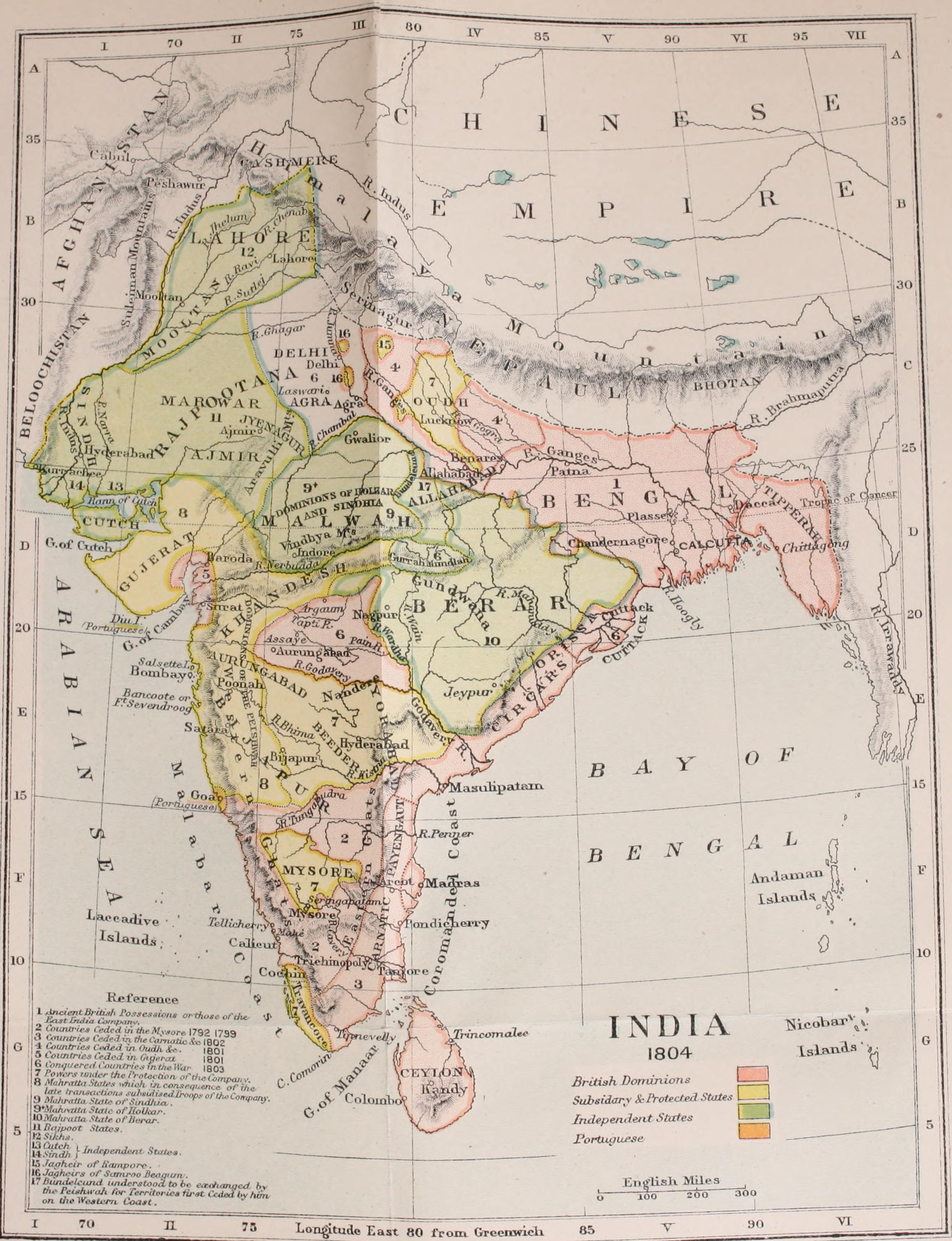
An old map of India in 1804. Note that only Thalassery, Kozhikode, and Kochi, are marked as cities within the present-day state of Kerala

Payyannur was the main venue of the Salt Satyagraha, a major turning point in the Indian Freedom Movement, in Malabar. On 13 April 1930, a batch of Congress volunteers under the leadership of K. Kelappan started on foot from Kozhikode to the beaches of Payyannur and broke the salt laws there on 21 April. The Satyagraha camp at Payyannur was raided and the campers were beaten up. The Uliyath Kadav Payyanur incident became a turning point in the history of freedom struggle in Kerala. It thrilled the people and thousands were ready to join in the struggle for freedom. The speeches of K. Kumar, the leader of the delegation that came from Travancore, inspired and energised thousands There were widespread demonstrations in Kannur, Thalassery and other parts of the district and a number of Congress workers were arrested. The period following the withdrawal of the civil disobedience Movement witnessed the emergence of radical wing in the Kerala Provincial Congress.

Some of the radical elements in the Kerala Provincial Congress organized a Kerala unit of the Congress Socialist Party in 1934 and functioned as a separate group within the Provincial Congress. The leadership of this group was in the hands of people like P. Krishna Pillai, A.K. Gopalan and E. M. S. Namboodiripad. K.V.Kunhikkannan Nair of Kadachira, Kannur, a socialist leader. An extremist group of Nationalist Muslims emerged within the Congress during this period under the leadership of Muhammad Abdur Rahiman. The Congress Socialists and the Nationalist Muslims made common cause against the Gandhian group known as the Right Wing which was led by such leaders as K. Kelappan, C.K. Govindan Nair and K.A. Damodara Menon.

A notable development in the politics of Malabar during the 1930s was the rise of the Muslim League as a district political party. The Muslim leaders Kannur and Thalassery played the lead roles in forming this organization. The leftist elements in the Kerala Provincial Congress were also active in the politics of Malabar in the late 30s. They took an active part in organizing the workers, peasants, students and teachers of Kannur district under their banner. In the election held to the Kerala Pradesh Congress Committee in January 1939, the Rightists suffered a severe setback. Muhammad Abdur Rahiman Sahib was elected as the president of the K.P.C.C and E. M. S. Namboodiripad as its general secretary. Towards the end of the same year, a branch of the Indian Communist Party was formally founded in Malabar. The Congress Socialist Party workers joined the Communist Party en bloc.

== Payyanur Conference ==
Kannur district became the focus of Kerala politics in May 1928, when the fourth All Kerala Political Conference was held at Payyanur under the auspices of the Kerala Provincial Congress. This conference was presided over by Pandit Jawaharlal Nehru. The Payyanur Conference passed a resolution requesting the Indian National Congress to adopt 'Complete Independence' instead of "Swaraj" as its goal at the annual session scheduled to take place at Calcutta during that year.

== Morazha Incident ==
The KPCC gave a call to the people of Malabar to observe 15 September 1940 as Anti-Imperialist Day. The action was disapproved by the Congress High Command, but there were meetings and demonstrations all over Malabar on this day. Kannur district was the centre of this agitation. There were violent clashes between the people and the police at several places and lathicharge and firing were resorted to by the police to meet the situation. Two young men were killed in a clash between a mob and a police party at Morazha. The men were police officers Sub-Inspector K.M Kuttikrishna Menon and Constable Raman. In connection with this incident, K.P.R. Gopalan, a prominent communist, was arrested on a charge of murder and later sentenced to death. But, owing to the intervention of several top-ranking political leaders, including Mahatma Gandhi, the death penalty was not carried out.

The Quit India Movement of August 1942 also had its echoes in Kannur district. A socialist group among the Congress workers under Dr. K. B. Menon provided leadership to the movement.

== Salt Sathyagraha ==
Payyannur was the main venue of the Salt Sathyagraha in Malabar. On 13 April, a batch of Congress volunteers under the leadership of K. Kelappan started on foot from Kozhikode to the beaches of Payyannur and broke the salt laws there on 21 April. The Satyagraha camp at Payyannur was raided and the campers were beaten up. There were widespread demonstrations in Kannur, Thalassery and other places. Congress workers broke salt laws and picketed foreign good dealers and liquor shops.

In Cannore, the Salt Satyagraha was spearheaded by K. Kumar of Travancore popularly known as Kumarji, Elanthoor Kumarji or Travancore Gandhi. K. Kumarji had come all the way from Trivandrum to British Malabar with a group of prominent activists to break Salt Law since political agitations were banned by Gandhi and INC in the Princely State. Kumar had long been a fierce and fearless campaigner and crusader for Civil Rights. His speeches made waves in Travancore and along the Malabar Cost and inspired people in large numbers to support the Civil disobedience movement,

K.Kumar was an active participant of the movement in different parts of British Malabar including Kozhikode and Tellissery. However, he had longed to court arrest in Cannore where Swadeshabhimani Ramakrishna was laid to rest. With the passing of the resolution to break salt law in Cannore that opportunity presented itself and he was invited to Cannore by Moyyarathu Sankaran Wikipedia-Malayalam: Moyyarathu Sankaran and others. Along with 101 volunteers Kumarji came to Cannore to break salt law. The British police and British supporters had done everything within their reach to disrupt the party and the talks of the leaders. However, people got enthusiastically drawn to Kumarji's speeches and defying all barriers squatted in large numbrrs on the bare beach to listen to him. The party made salt and took out a procession along the city carrying on their head mud-pots with the salt they had made. Moyyarathu Sankaran says in his autobiography that Cannore had never before witnessed a mass uprising or mass celebration of that magnitude. On 19 April, the third day of making salt, Kumar was arrested from the Satyagraha Camp. He was convicted on 27 May 1930. The Police Inspector summoned Moyyarathu Sankaran and canned him for entertaining trouble-makers of Travancore. Kumarji was sent to Cannore Jail and was later shifted to Vellore to serve a term of 9 months. People of Cannore gave him an emotional farewell. The other agitators included Mohammed Yousuf, Moyyarathu Sankaran, KP Gopalan and Umman Varghese,

The period following the withdrawal of the Civil Disobedience Movement witnessed the emergence of a radical wing in the Kerala Provincial Congress. Some of the radical elements in the Kerala Provincial Congress organised a Kerala unit of the Congress Socialist Party in 1934 and functioned as a separate group within the Provincial Congress. The leadership of this group was in the hands of persons like P. Krishna Pillai, A.K. Gopalan and E.M.S. Namboothiripad. An extremist group of Nationalist Muslims also emerged within the Congress during this period under the leadership of Muhammad Abdur Rahiman. The Congress Socialists and the Nationalist Muslims made common cause against the Gandhian group known as the Right Wing which was led by such leaders as K. Kelappan, C.K. Govindan Nair and K. A. Damodara Menon.

A notable development in the politics of Malabar during the thirties was the rise of the Muslim League as a district political party. It was the Muslim leaders of Kannur and Thalassery who played the lead role in forming this organisation.

The leftist elements in the Kerala Provincial Congress were also active in the politics of Malabar in the late thirties. They took active part in organising the workers, peasants, students and teachers of Kannur district under their banner. In the election held to the Kerala Provincial Congress Committee in January 1939, the Rightists suffered a severe set back. Muhammad Abdur Rahiman was elected as the president of the K.P.C.C. and E.M.S. Namboothiripad as its general secretary. Towards the end of the same year, a branch of the Indian Communist Party was formally founded in Malabar. The Congress Socialist Party workers joined the Communist Party block.

== Peasant struggles ==
World War II, especially in the period from 1943 to 1945, ravaged the district. Famine and a cholera epidemic took thousands of lives from the lower strata of society. On the initiative of the people under the leadership of the Kisan Sabha, commendable services were rendered to tide over the crisis. The "Grow More Food Campaign", organized at Mangattuparamba by the Kisan Sabha, was a new chapter in the history of mass movement. More than 50 acres (20 ha) of government land was brought under cultivation. However, the government suppressed the movement by force and destroyed the farm.

Though the war ended in 1945, famine continued to haunt the people. Karivellor, Poomaram (Thillenkeri) the northernmost village of the present Kannur district, made a historic stride in the struggle against poverty and famine. The transporting of paddy rice from Karivellore to Chirakkal Kovilakom was blocked and distributed to the people of the village. The movement was led by peasant leaders such as A.V. Kunhambu and K. Krishnan Master. One Kannan and Kunhambu became martyrs in the struggle when police opened fire.

During December 1946, the people of Kavumbayi, an eastern village of the district, raised their demand for punam cultivation. A strong police contingent was sent to the spot. The peasants resisted the armed forces which led to the killing of five peasants in the firing.

The rise of the organized working class in the industrial sector was another important phenomenon of the period that changed the course of the anti-imperialism movement. The struggle of Aron Mill workers in 1946 is noteworthy in this regard. Even after independence, the struggles of the peasantry formed an important part in the history of the state. They fought against landlords and their exploitation. Places like Thillankeri, Manayankunnu, Korom and Paddikkunnu are memorable in the annals of the peasant struggles in the post independence era. The All India Conference of Kisan Sabha, held at Kannur in 1953, resolved to initiate struggles for new tenancy legislation. The movement for Aikya Kerala also got momentum during this period and all sections of the society rallied under the movement.

== St. Angelos Fort ==
St. Angelo Fort was built in 1505 by Dom Francisco de Almeida, the first Portuguese Viceroy of India. It is situated by the Laccadive Sea about 3 km from Kannur town. In 1507, the fort was besieged by the local ruler; the Portuguese rule over Cananor (as they spelt it) would last 158 years and then replaced by the Dutch. The ownership of the fort has changed hands several times. In 1663, the Dutch captured it. They subsequently gave the fort its present appearance. The Dutch sold the fort to the Arakkal Royal family in 1772. During this time, the Arakkal Sultanate began issuing coins.

The British conquered it in 1790 and used it as one of their major military stations on the Malabar Coast. It is fairly well preserved as a protected monument under the Archaeological Survey of India. A painting of this fort and the fishing ferry as a background is on display at the Rijksmuseum in Amsterdam. Kunjali Marakkar's head was removed from his body and exhibited in the fort after his assassination.

== Muslim Dynasty ==
During the 17th century, Kannur was the capital city of the only Muslim Sultanate in India, known as Arakkal. During the British Raj, Kannur was part of the Madras province in the North Malabar District.

The guerrilla war by Pazhassi Raja, the ruler of Kottayam province, against the British had a huge impact in the history of Kannur. Changes in the socio-economic and political sectors in Kerala during the initial decades of 20th century created conditions congenial for the growth of the Communist Party.

== Reformist Movements ==
New strains of thought developed as capitalist transformation laid the foundation for the commencement of social reform movements in sections of society. At the all India level, Vivekananda and others put forward such thoughts. Against this background social reform movements started by Sree Narayana Guru, Ayyankali and others in southern parts of Kerala and by Vagbhatananda and others in northern parts got developed into movements against superstition and bad customs. These evoked a big stirring among the people. An attitude against untouchability and casteism and interest in acquiring modern education were evident among all sections. Pressures for the same started developing in the society.

Extension of English education initiated by Christian missionaries in 1906 and later carried forward by government, rebellion for wearing a cloth to cover upper parts of body, installing an idol at Aruvippuram in 1888, Malayali Memorial in 1891, establishment of SNDP Yogam in 1903, activities, struggles etc. became factors helpful to accelerate changes in Kerala society during a short time. Movements for liberation from the colonial rule of British imperialism and struggles launched by these movements grew with them.

During this period, social renaissance movements and independence movement were growing. Ideas about socialism and Soviet Revolution reached Kerala. Such ideas got propagated in Kerala through the works of Swadeshabhimani Ramakrishna Pillai, Sahodaran Ayyappan, P. Kesavadev and others.

== Socialist Movements ==
During this period against the background of sufferings inflicted by Janmithama(a system wherein feudal landlords controlled land)nd imperialism, struggles and organizations of peasants and workers started emerging slowly. The practice of collective bargaining by working people also started. The peasant rebellion known as Malabar Rebellion of 1921 and consequent political changes highly influenced the independence movement of Kerala.

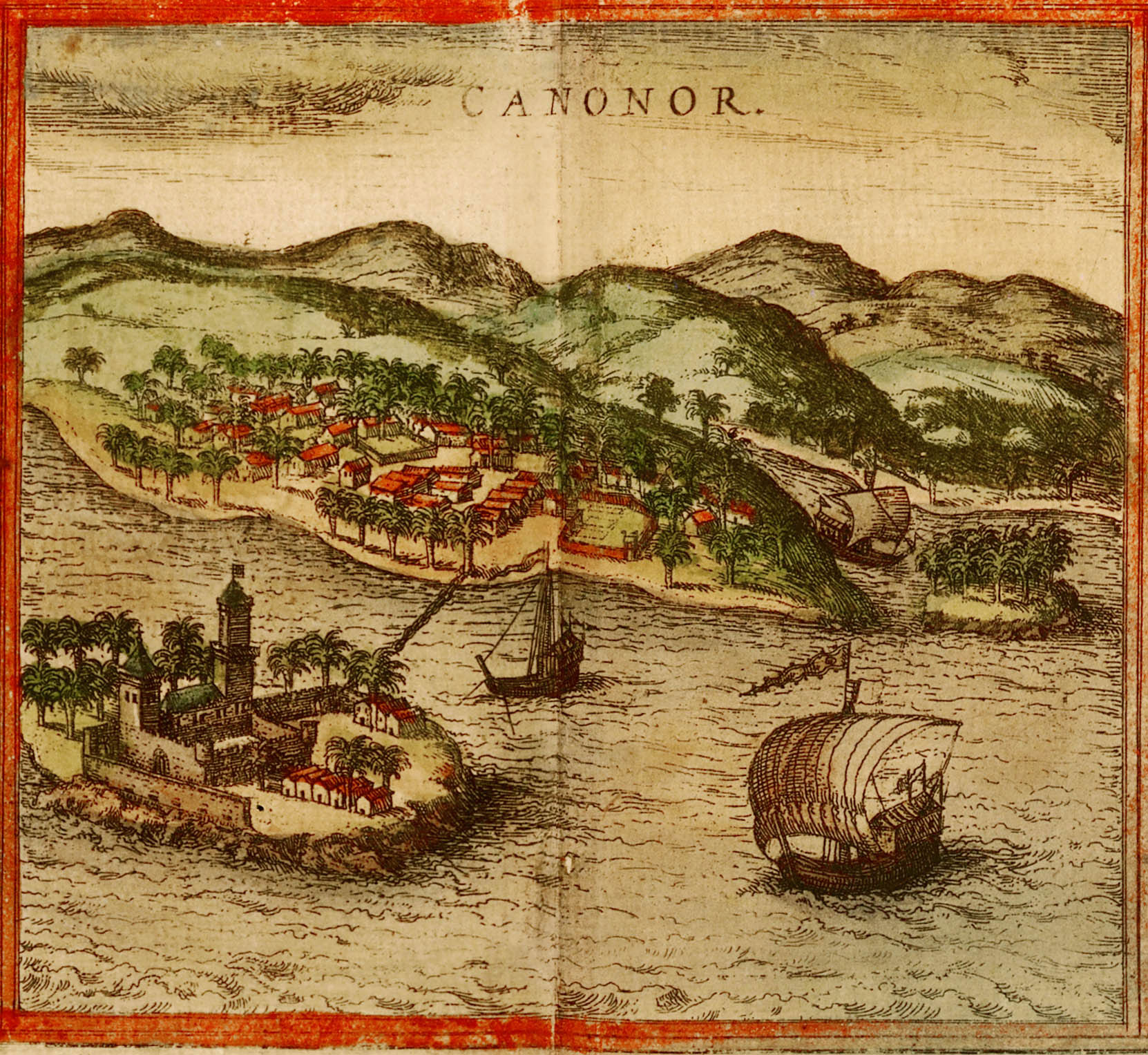
City of Cannanore, 1572

A number of Kerala youth were jailed during this period for participating in ‘violation of law’ movement as part of independence movement. At this time Kiran Chandra Das (brother of Jithendra Das), Kamal Nath Thivari, Sen Gupta, T.N. Chandravarthi and Sarath Chandra Acharya were in a Kannur jail and Jayadev Kapur in a Vellore jail. Malayalee youngsters got an opportunity to get acquainted with them, be suggested books to read, and discuss issues. They came to know of many new aspects of political work. This gave them a new sense of direction. E.M.S writes about this:

"It will not be a big exaggeration to say that seeds of left, Congress and Congress Socialist movements were sown at Kannur jail and that too by Thivari."

It was youth dissatisfied by the Congress policy which was afraid of people's advance who were attracted to the socialist idea. At that time there was an atmosphere in Kerala which gave strength to such thoughts.

People were suffering a lot due to persecution by landlords. Against this resistance and organizations were cropping up here and there. In 1935 July a meeting of peasants were held in the Bharatheeya building in Naniyoor in Kolachery Amsom of old Chirakkal Taluk. Kolachery Karshaka Sangham was formed with Vishnu Bharatheeyan as president and K.A. Keraleeyan as secretary. By September 1935, Karivelloor Karshaka Sangham was formed which represented round Karivelloor, Velloor, Peralam and Kotakkad. With the formation of All India Kisan Sabha in 1936 a new front of struggle was opened in agrarian sector. The Hunger March led by AKG in 1936 July raising the demands of peasants imparted a new vigour to this sector. Following this a number of Karshaka Sangham were formed in Malabar. In 1936 November the first Karshaka Conference of Chirakkal Taluk was held at Parassinikkadavu. In 1937 All Malabar conference of Karshaka Sangham was held in Kozhikode. This awakening among peasants prepared the ground for the advent of a new political movement.

Trade unions started to be formed and strengthened. Global economic crisis of 1929 started creating serious consequences in Indian economy as well. First Travancore Labour Association came into being. Such organizations later became militant trade unions. Strikes were organized in Kozhikkode, Kannur, Pappinisseri, Thalassery and other centres of commerce which further strengthened trade unions. In 1935 May the first Kerala Workers’ conference was held at Kozhikode. This initiative to bring up working class as an independent class force prepared the ground for propagating Communist ideas. During this period coir workers in Travancore got organized and achieved strength. In Kochi organizations like Cochin Sterling Workers’ Union were being formed. Labour brotherhood and trade unions of Alagappa Textiles and Sitaram Mills were formed. In 1937 second All Kerala Workers’ Conference was held at Thrissur. This organizational consciousness developed among workers prepared the ground for a new politics.

By the beginning of the 1930s some other useful developments were taking place. Important among them was Nivarthana Agitation in Travancore. That was the demand of people suppressed so far as untouchables and weaker sections for participation in government. This brought to the forefront struggles like proportional representation in government and reservation of jobs. This imparted a new enthusiasm among oppressed masses.

== See also ==
- History of Thalassery
