= Bhageerathi Amma =

Indian centenarian and winner of Nari Shakti Puraskar (1914–2021)

Bhageerathi Amma (1914 – 22 July 2021) was an Indian woman who lived in the Kollam district of Kerala. She came to national attention when she returned to education at the age of 105. She was honoured with the Nari Shakti Puraskar the highest civilian award for women by Govt of India from the President of India and prime minister Narendra Modi singled her out for praise.

== Life ==
Bhageerathi Amma was born in 1914 in British India and lived in Prakkulam in the Kollam district of Kerala. Her mother died in childbirth and Amma took on caring for her younger siblings. After she married, her husband died in the 1930s and she was left to bring up her children alone. Amma was reported to have five or six children, 13 or 16 grandchildren and 12 great-grandchildren. She enjoyed watching cricket and soap operas on television.

At the age of 105, Amma decided to continue her education and took examinations in Mathematics, the Malayalam language and Environmental Science. Because of her age, the Kerala Literacy Mission permitted her to take the exams at home over three days. She scored 205 out of 275 points and was acknowledged as the oldest person to take the equivalency exams.

== Awards and recognition ==
Amma was announced as a winner of the 2019 Nari Shakti Puraskar. Prime Minister Narendra Modi singled her out for special praise, saying "if we wish to progress in life, we should develop ourselves, if we wish to achieve something in life, the first pre-condition for that is the student within us must never die". Another winner was fellow Keralan 98-year-old Karthyayani Amma.

Amma was unable to attend the award ceremony due to ill health, but soon afterwards she received a retrospective pension of Rs 1,500 per month. She had previously been unable to give her biometric information to get an Aadhaar in order to receive it but a nationalised bank helped her meet the requirements.

== Death ==
On 22 July 2021, Amma died at the age of 107 due to age-related ailments.
