= M. S. Sunil =

Indian academic, humanist and philanthropist

Dr. M.S. Sunil
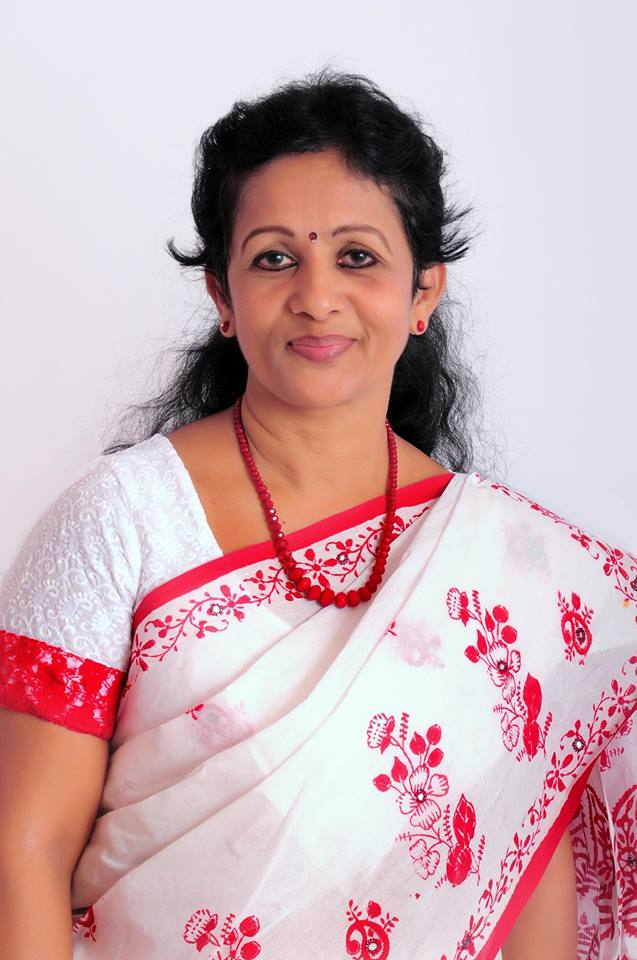
- Born: c. 1960 (age 65–66); Kerala
- Occupation: Retired Professor of Zoology
- Known for: Philanthropist, Humanist, Environmentalist
- Partner: P. Thomas
- Children: Prince Sunil Thomas

Dr. M.S. Sunil (born c.1960) is an Indian Academic, Humanist and Philanthropist known for housing the homeless. She founded Dr. M.S. Sunil Foundation in December, 2016 in Pathanamthitta, with five trust members and six volunteers. Her works focuses to uplift the living conditions of impoverished families/ communities, her philanthropist and non- profit programmes aim to provide safe houses and healthy food to build a compassionate environment with enlightened mind on renewable energy and conservation of natural habitat by including every communities including Tribal and socially underprivileged with less or no inequality. She was acknowledged by the Government of India and was the recipient of many honours, including the Nari Shakti Puraskar- 2017 which is considered as the Government of India's highest civilian honour for women.

== Life ==
Her philanthropy began when she was still at school giving food to begging children.

Sunil is a retired professor of zoology, of Catholicate College Pathanamthitta, Mahatma Gandhi University, Kerala, and she retired as the head of the Department of Zoology in 2016.

In 2005 she was moved to action when she realised that one of her students taking a master's degree did not have a proper house. She did not turn to an organisation but to herself. By gathering money and materials from friends and by herself, she organised a plan to construct a house.

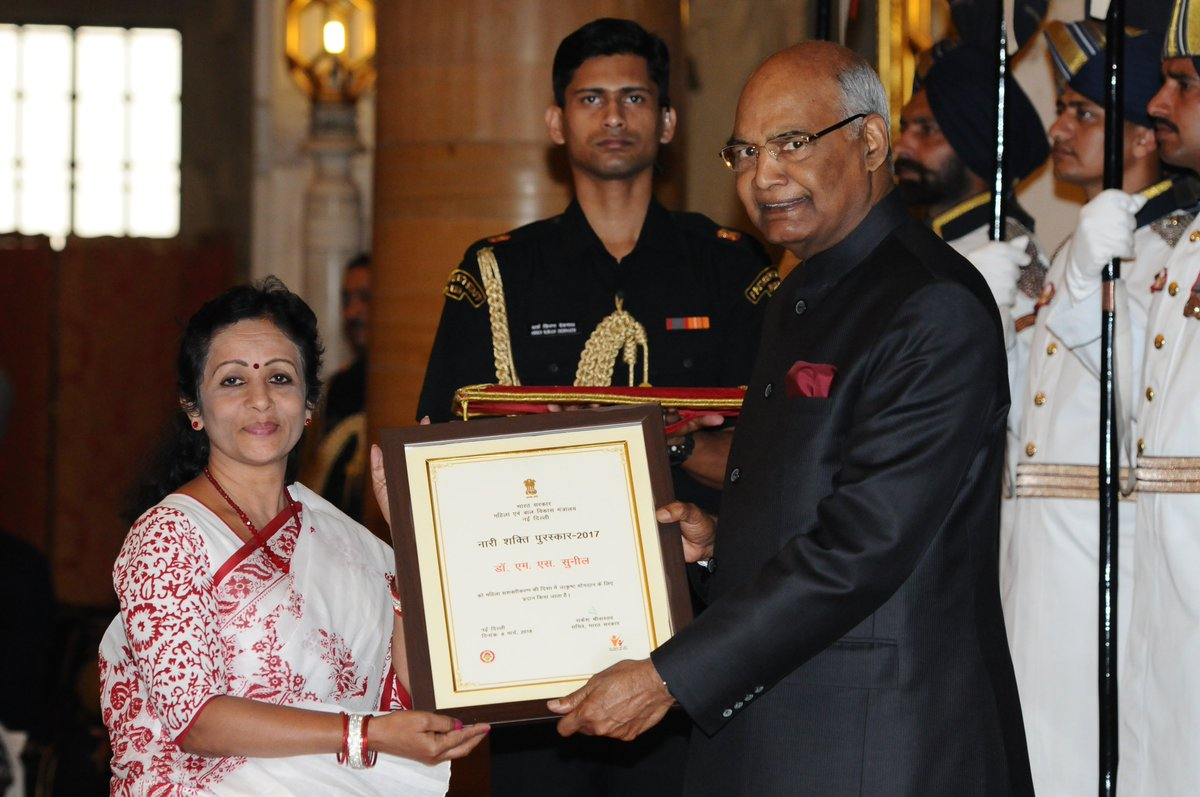
M.S. Sunil and her 2018 award

After analysing the background and poverty level, to improve the living condition of the society she dealt with several projects and helped numerable families (from 2005) before registering the Dr. M.S. Sunil Foundation in 2016.

'Home for Homeless' is a dream project of Dr. M.S. Sunil Foundation which aims at constructing and Providing homes for the neediest people, especially widows with children, and Patients. Homes for the 'Poorest of the Poor' touched the figure of 200 by March 2021, and about 810 individuals were benefitted from it.

She was chosen to be one of three award winners from Kerala of the Nari Shakti Puraskar. The others were scientist Lizymol Philipose and temple artist Syamala Kumari. The awards were made on International Women's Day in 2018 on behalf of the Ministry of Women and Child Development by the President of India. The award is the highest award for women in India. Dr. M.S. Sunil buys all the materials for the construction by herself and she also supervises the construction of each new house. The houses are made with minimum resources and are of affordable cost. The initiators consciously avoided pollutants and focused on ecological conservation while constructing houses. Including a kitchen and a toilet within the area of 650 sq ft, the houses consist of 7 ventilations for air circulation. The houses are built in 35 days and topped with a roof made from galvanised steel. By the time of her award she had built over eighty houses.

In 2020 she went to meet Karthyayani Amma who was a 98 year old who had been also nominated for the Nari Shakti Puraskar. Amma had never flown before but she was reassured by Dr. M.S. Sunil days before she flew to Delhi.

== Awards and achievements ==
M. S. Sunil was NSS District Coordinator for two years, programme officer of Red Ribbon Club (2006–2016) and was the officer in charge of Boomithra Sena Club. She was the recipient of Best Blood Donor Motivator Award 2008, 2009, 2010, 2014, 2015 and received Human Right Defender Award, 2016.

- Nari Shakthi Puraskar(2018) from the Hon. President of India
- Holy Innocence award (2020)
- Niswardha Puraskar by Radio Macfast (2020)

• Lifetime achievement award (KCS) Chicago • Work of mercy award 2018- SYMS Beharin • Women achiever award 2018- The Hindu • Air India- Manorama best teacher award • Mahila rethnam award of human rights foundation • Seva keerthi purskaram – Janam TV • Mother Teresa award- Kalayapuram ashraya • Jeevakarunya purskaram- justice V.R. Krishnaiyyar foundation • Sthree Shakthi award 2018- News18 • Eastern Bhoomika Award 2018 • Dr. Kamala bhaskar Award • Human rights defender Award, 2016 • Best blood donor motivator Award, 2015 • Best blood donor motivator Award, 2014 • Best bhoomithra sena club State Award • Sath seva Puraskar of Lions club • Malayalappuzha gopalakrishnan pradhama Puraskar • Good Samaritan special Puraskar • Ambedkar fellowship 2010 • Paristhithi award 2010 • Jenaseva puraskar • Gandhibhavan award for best social worker • Vanitha samaj seva Puraskar • Desamithra special puraskaram 2009 • Best blood donor motivator Award, 2008–10 • Kera keralam project merit certificate. • Best N.S.S. programme officer award of M.G. University 2006–2008 • Best N.S.S. programme officer award of the State 2007-2008 • Mar Theodocious Award (2023)- Dubai • Seva Puraskar (2024)- Kerala Vision- Channel • Parabrahma Chaithanya Puraskar (2025) • P.P. Mukundan Sevana Puraskaram (2025) • Outstanding Social Worker Empowerment Award (2025) • Easwaramma VarenyaPuraskar of Sathyasai baba trust
