= Lizymol Philipose Pamadykandathil =

Indian dental materials scientist

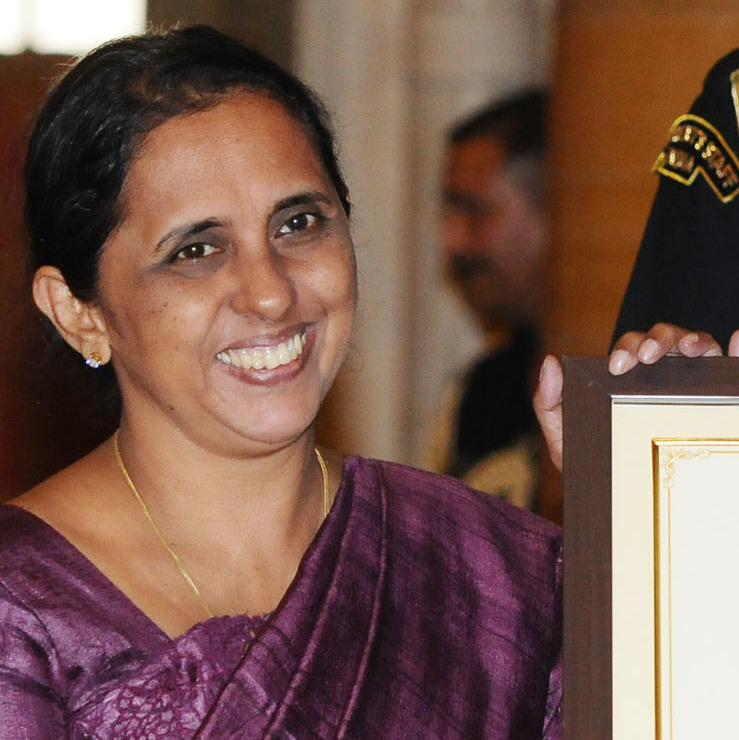
- Education: Mahatma Gandhi University, Kottayam
- Occupation: materials scientist
- Known for: receiving the Nari Shakti Puraskar

Lizymol Philipose Pamadykandathil is an Indian dental materials scientist. Her work has been recognised with a Nari Shakti Puraskar - the highest civilian honour exclusively for women in India.

== Life ==
She holds a doctorate and master's degree from Mahatma Gandhi University, Kottayam. She was awarded her doctorate degree in 1998.

She received the Young Scientist Award for the year 2002 of the State Committee on Science, Technology and Environment, Government of Kerala.

She was conferred the youth of the year award in 2015 and received a certificate of appreciation to honour her achievements in science, from the Youths Association, Church of the East, Central Committee, India and the Dr. S. Vasudev Award 2014 of KSCSTE, Govt. of Kerala

On International Women's Day (8 March) 2017 she was one of thirty women and nine institutions who received the Nari Shakti Puraskar - the highest civilian honour for women in India from the Honourable President Ram Nath Kovind at the Presidential Palace in New Delhi. Other award winners from Kerala were temple painter Syamala Kumari and zoologist M.S. Sunil. The award came with 100,000 rupees. She was recognised for developing a bioactive polymer and polymer based composite material which can be used for dental restoration and as bone cement for fixing implants.

She works with the Sree Chitra Tirunal Institute for Medical Sciences and Technology in Trivandrum.

She has been a recipient of the 7th and 10th National Awards for Technology Innovation awarded by Government of India. She is the recipient of Kerala state science literature puraskaram (children science) in 2020 from KSCSTE, the government of Kerala. She has 30 patents including 21 granted Indian patents, 11 transferred technologies and multiple commercialized technologies to her credit.

== Publications ==
- A comparison of efficiency of two photoinitiators for polymerization of light-cure dental composite resins, Journal of Applied Polymer Science, 2008, 107; 3337-3342 S.
- Studies on shrinkage, depth of cure, and cytotoxic behavior of novel organically modified ceramic based dental restorative resins, Journal of Applied Polymer Science, 2010, 116; 2645–2650.
- Studies on new organically modified ceramics based dental restorative resins, Journal of Applied Polymer Science, 2010, 116; 509–517.
- Synthesis and characterization of ladder structured ormocer resin of siloxane backbone and methacrylate side chain by Bridget JW. et al, Materials Letters

== Books ==
- Lizymol P.P. "DhanthaShuchitwavumArogyavum" in Malayalam. Mar Narsai Printers and Publishers, Thrissur, Kerala (Received the Kerala state science Literature award(KSCSTE) 2020(Children's literature)
