= Barefoot Empress =

- Directed by: Vikas Khanna
- Produced by: Doug Roland; Bindu Khanna
- Starring: Karthyayani Amma
- Cinematography: Omee Ganatra
- Edited by: Ashish Uikey; Archit Rastogi
- Music by: Raashi Kulkarni; Ila Paliwal; Priyabrata Panigrahi
- Production companies: Doug Roland Films; House of Omkaar; Saffron Pen; 1ampictures
- Release date: 13 May 2021
- Running time: 15 minutes
- Countries: India; United States
- Language: Malayalam

Barefoot Empress is an Indo-American short documentary film directed by Vikas Khanna. The film depicts the life story of a woman in India who enrolls in first grade at the age of 96. The film is co-produced by Oscar nominated Doug Roland and Deepak Chopra serves as an executive producer.

== Summary ==
Barefoot Empress, a 15-minute short film revolves around Karthyayani Amma, who, having never had access to education as a girl, finally gets a chance at education. At 96-years-old she was the oldest among the 43,330 candidates who appeared for the 'Aksharalaksham' test, a fourth standard equivalent examination. Karthyayani Amma scored a 98 out of 100 on a literacy examination conducted by the Kerala government. The state-run Kerala State Literacy Mission Authority (KSLMA) has certified that her score is a record.

== Production history ==
Karthyayani Amma's story caught director Vikas Khanna's attention via a tweet in 2018. Hearing the first-hand account of her life inspired the making of Barefoot Empress.

== Accolades ==
Year	Award	Category	Result	Ref.
2021	Bangalore Shorts Film Festival	Festival Award	Won	
2022	ShortShorts Film Festival	Biogen award	Won	
2022	Big Apple Film Festival	Short Documentary	Won	
