= Syamala Kumari =

Indian temple painter

K. Syamalakumari
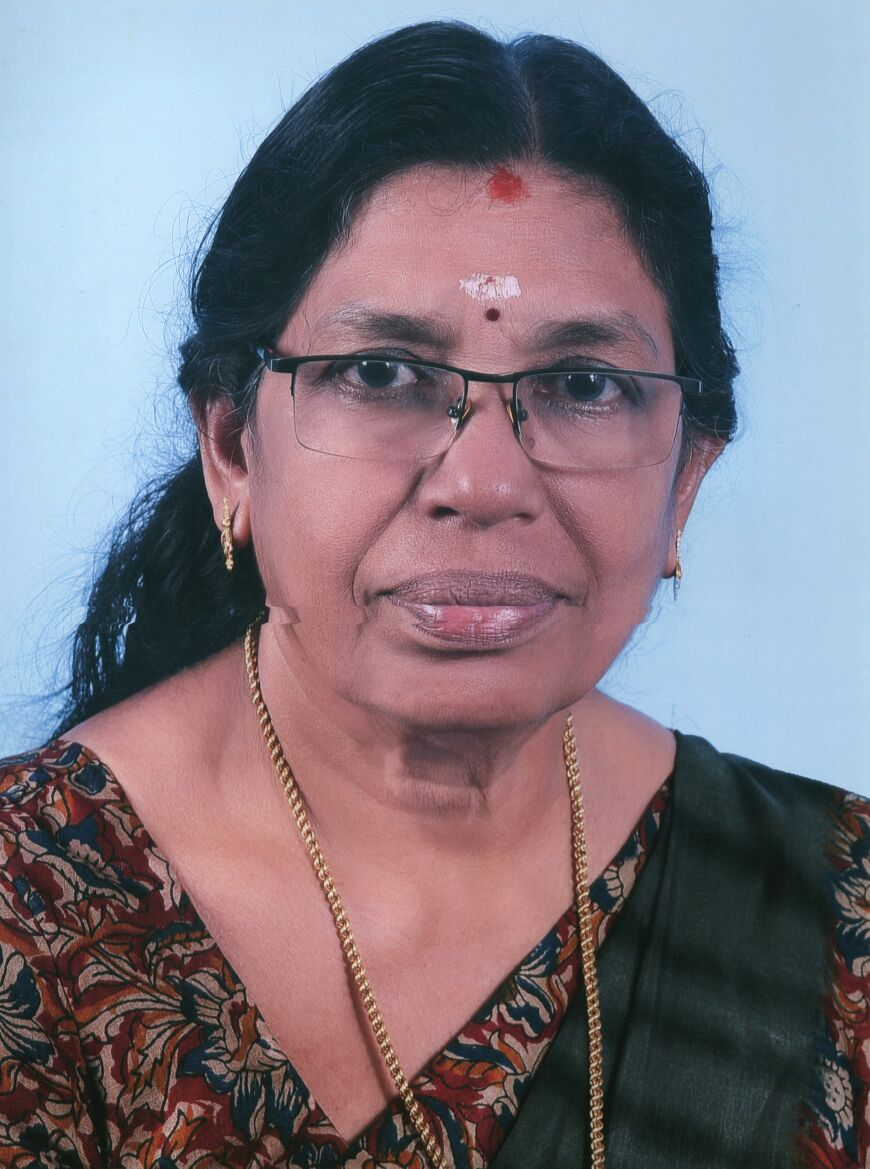
- Occupation: mural painter
- Known for: restoring Kerala's temple murals
- Spouse: G. Azhicode

K. Syamalakumari aka Syamala Kumari is an Indian temple painter. This was an occupation traditionally carried out by men. Her work includes painting at the Sri Padmanabhaswamy Temple in Kerala. She has been awarded the Nari Shakti Puraskar.

== Life ==
She was the first woman known to have been a Mural Artist in temples in Kerala. She gained an interest in mural paintings at the turn of the millennium. She has not just painted in the temples but she has helped to restore and preserve the traditional mural art present on the temple walls in Kerala. Syamalakumari has created documentaries. She has created paintings at Navarathri Mandapam and at Sri Padmanabhaswamy Temple aided by her husband G. Azhicode.

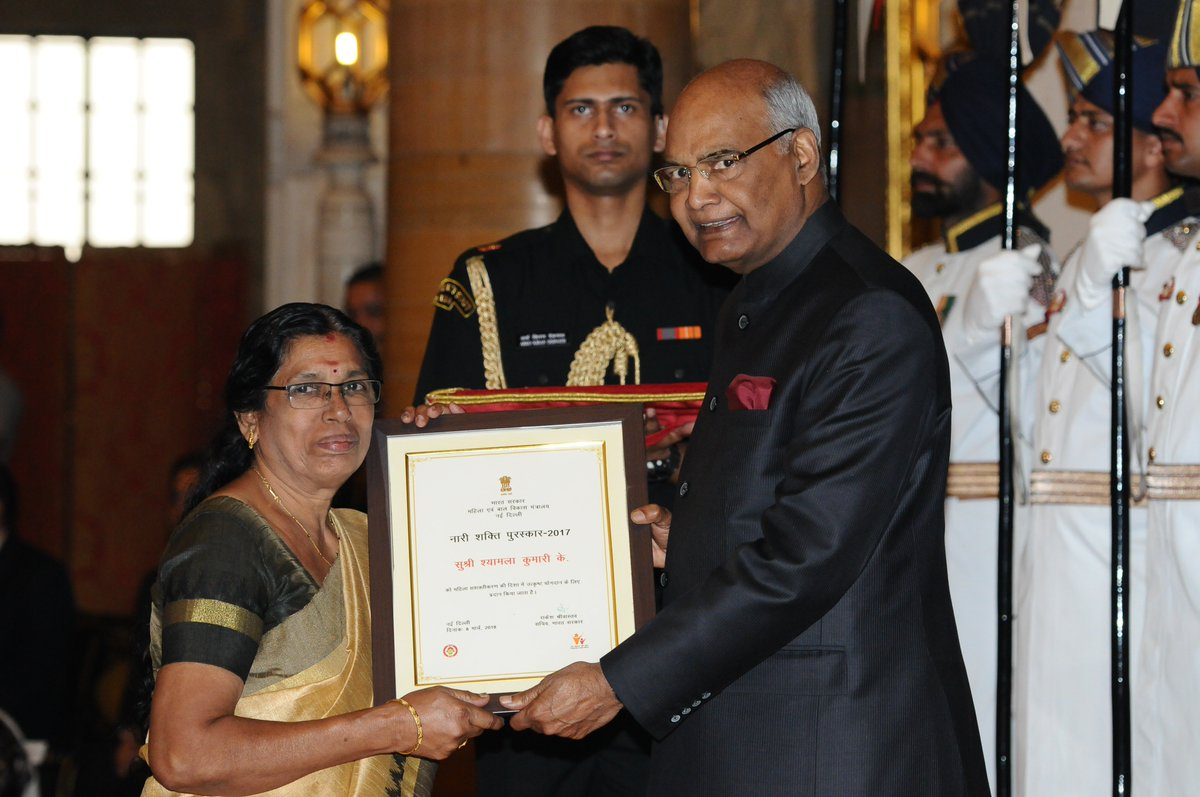
Syamala Kumari receiving the Nari Shatki Puraskar in 2018

She has sold her work outside of her work in the temples. People who want her murals specify a subject and a size. Given the height and width, Syamalakumari would sketch the design and then the colours are applied which gradually build up the completed mural. The work is carried out by not just herself and her husband but their son is involved too. In addition to the murals she sells her art applied to pottery and to bamboo.

On International Women's Day in 2018 she was given the Nari Shakti Puraskar. Other award winners from Kerala were scientist Lizymol Philipose and zoologist M.S. Sunil. The award was made at the Presidential Palace (Rastrapati Bhavan) in New Delhi by the President of India Ram Nath Kovind witnessed by the Prime Minister of India, Narendra Modi and the Minister for Women & Child Development, Maneka Sanjay Gandhi. About 30 people and nine organisations were recognised that day, receiving the award and a prize of 100,000 rand.
