= History of Thalassery =

Thalassery was a trade hub where Chinese, Arab, and Jewish traders had considerable influence in the spice market; before that the Greeks and Romans were in the trade. It was the European invasion that brought significant change as they enforced the trade with their military.

== Arrival of the Europeans ==
Francisco de Almeida, the first Portuguese viceroy to India, established military barracks in Cannanore (~30 km north of Thalassery) in 1505. The Netherlands followed the Portuguese after the Dutch army defeated the Portuguese in Cochin in 1663. The French East India Company established military units in Thalassery in 1721 and later moved to Mahé (~5 km south of Thalassery).

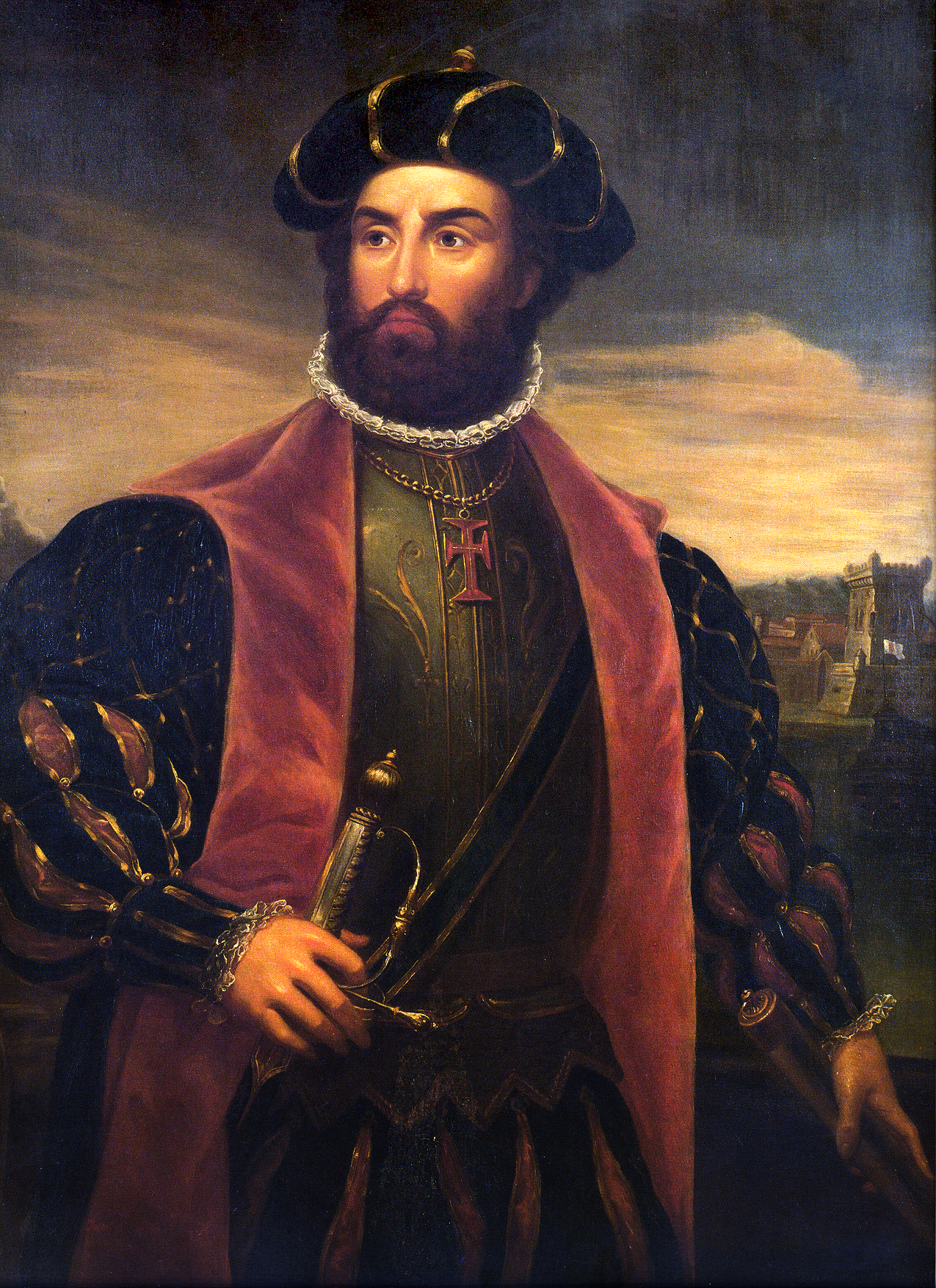
Vasco da Gama a painting- The trade alliance between Vasco da Gama and Kolathiri gave Portugal direct access to the spice trade market especially for pepper.

== Anglo-Mysore Wars ==
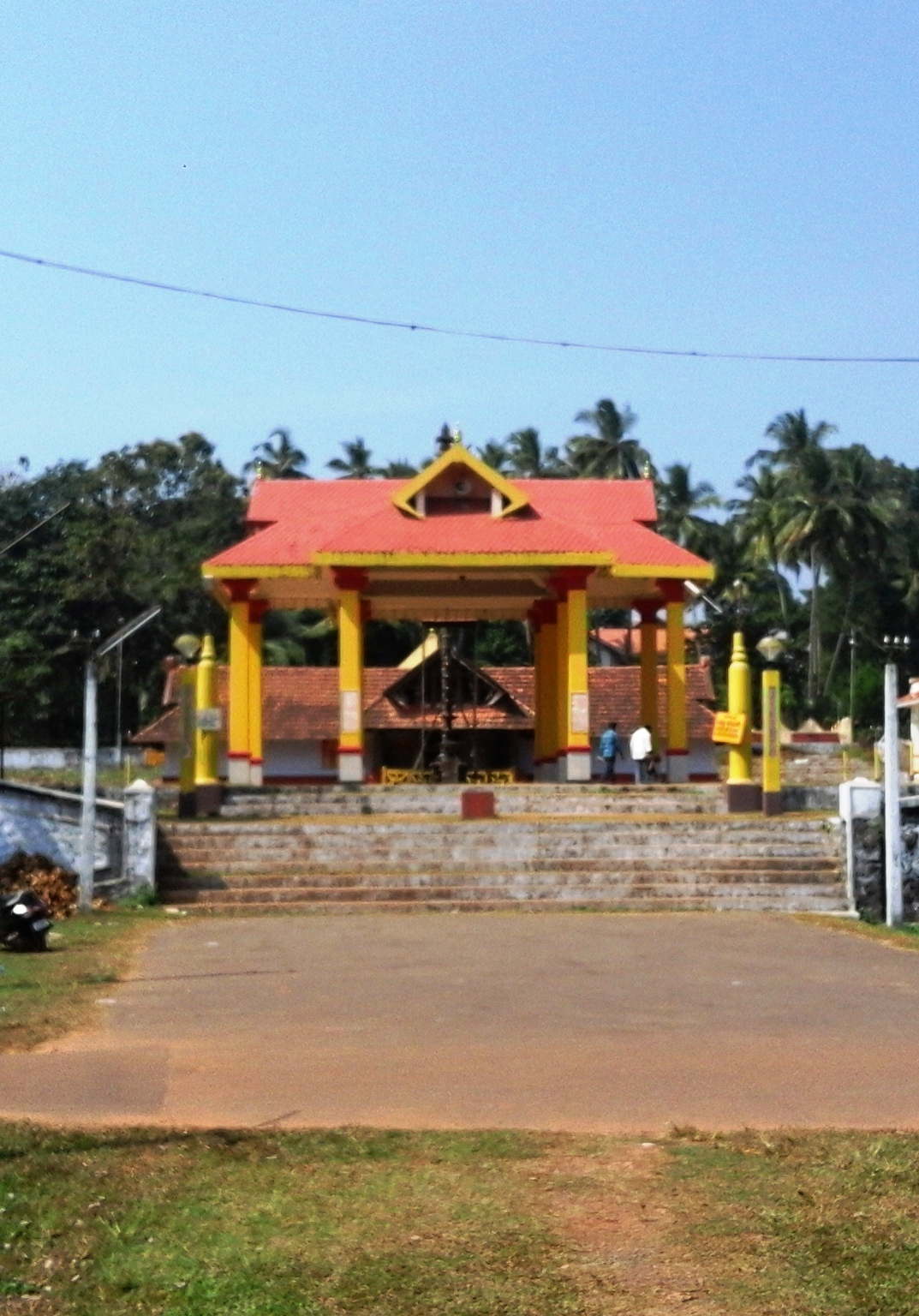
Thalassery Jagannath Temple, Kerala

In 1766, Hyder Ali and his forces were welcomed to North Malabar by the Ali Raja of Arakkal kingdom in Cannanore. The Mysorean army, guided by Ali Raja and his brother, seized the palace of the Raja of Kolathiri in Chirakkal, causing the Raja and his family to seek refuge in the English trading station at Tellichery.

The Seven Years' War between British and French had repercussions for the area. The prince regent attacked Thalassery on Hyder's order to protect the French forces in Mahé from the British. British forces in Tellicherry attacked Mahé and forced the French to evacuate in 1779. This prompted the Zamorin and Kottayam Raja to ally with the British and they recaptured most of the territories that had been lost to Hyder. Later, due to an attack by the prince regent in Tellicherry, the British left Mahé.

In December 1773, the British from Thalassery stormed Arakkal Palace, which had resisted, disarming Tipu's Cannanore garrison. They forced Arakkal Beevi into a peace treaty. By the 1774 Treaty of Mangalore concluding the Second Anglo-Mysore War, the English gave up their claims and declared the kingdoms in Kerala to be allies of Mysore.

The British exploited Hyder's death and Tipu's 1781 retirement to Mysore for his coronation. Tipu returned in 1789 and captured south Malabar, but he was not able to win Thalassery and North Malabar due to the English presence.

== The Spice Trade ==
The British established a trading post and built a factory at Tellicherry in 1694, having gained permission from Vadakkalankur, the prince regent of the Raja of Kolatunad. They had already been trading on the Malabar coast for much of that century, buying pepper from Moplah merchants, and had established a similar post at Travancore ten years earlier.

== Thalassery Fort ==
The Raja of Kolathunad laid the foundation stone for Thalassery fort. The Prince gave the fort and adjoining land to the British on 20 August 1708. The fort was later modified and extended by the British East India Company.

Meanwhile Kurungot Nair continued his attack, until, in September1719, he suspended hostilities and formally entered into a friendship treaty with the British. The treaty gave them permission to trade pepper in Thalassery without paying duty. After the construction of the fort, Thalassery grew into a prominent trade center and a port in British Malabar. The British won administrative authority over Malabar after annexation from Tipu Sultan in the Battle of Sree Rangapatnam. Thalassery became the capital of British North Malabar. When English companies united in 1702, the affiliated factories under Bombay were Karwar, Tellicherry, Calicut and Anjengo. Factory administration was conducted by a chief and councilors, known as 'factors'.

== Anjarakkandy Spice Plantation ==
In 1797 The British East India Company established a spice plantation in Anjarakandy in Thalassery. In 1799 it was handed over to Lord Murdoch Brown with a 99-year lease. Coffee, cinnamon, pepper and nutmeg were cultivated there. The Anjarakandy cinnamon plantation was the world's largest at that time.

The British East India Company established the first registrar office in south India, in Anjarakandy near Tellicherry in 1865, just to register the cinnamon plantation of Murdoch Brown. The Anjarakandy estate spanned 500 acres (200 ha). He surveyed that land and appointed officers to survey the locals' land. The British approved his surveys. This established a new model of administration, its first use in Asia.

== Overbury's Folly ==
Overbury's Folly was built by E. N. Overbury, a local British judge in the 1870s. The old market in that time was only 100 meters from the current sea shore, and the sea eroded it and surrounding areas. The seawalls built on Overbury's order saved Thalassery from further erosion, even though his order was originally mocked as a folly.

== The Pazhassi Guerilla Wars ==
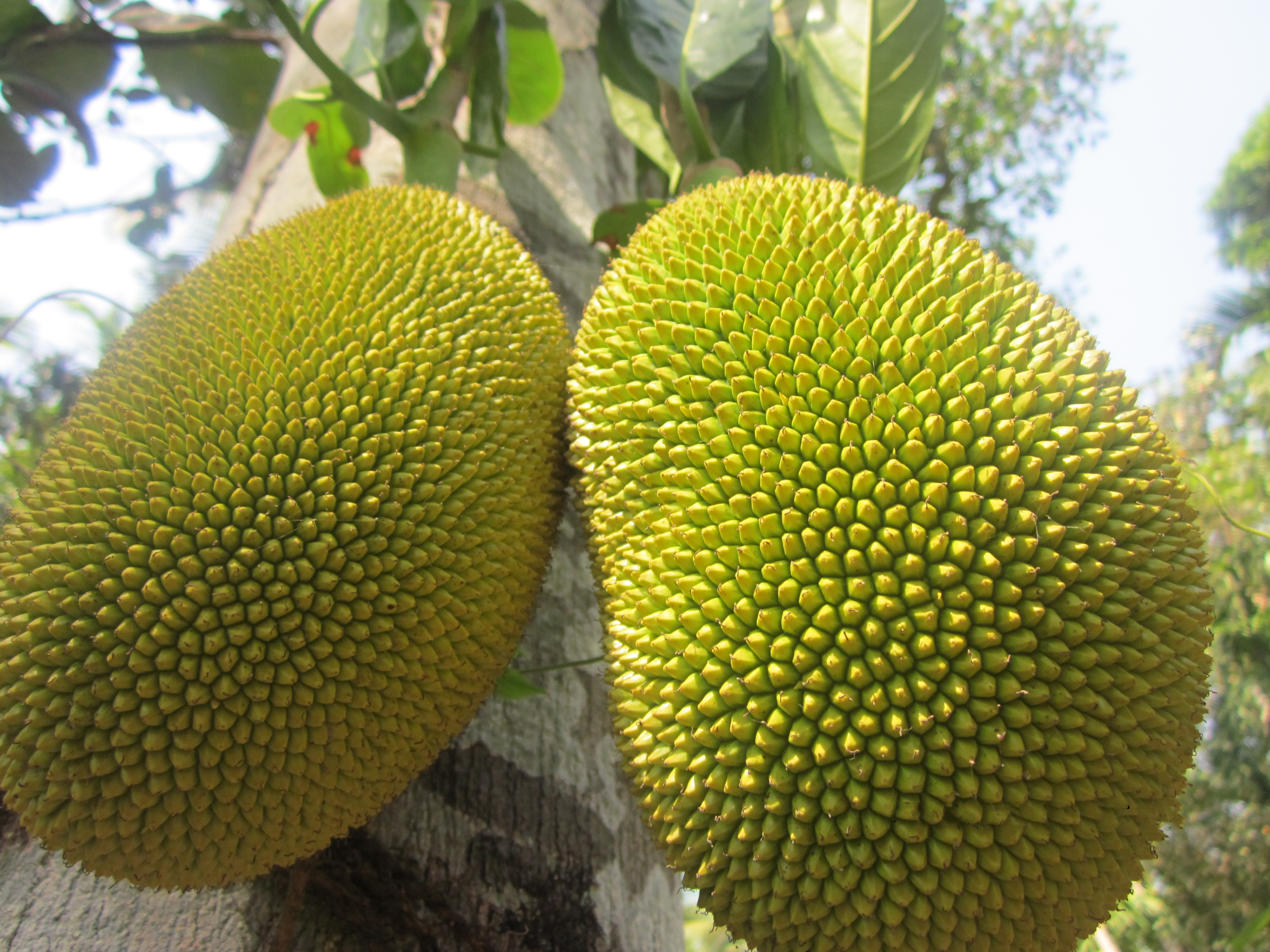
Jackfruit from Dharmadam

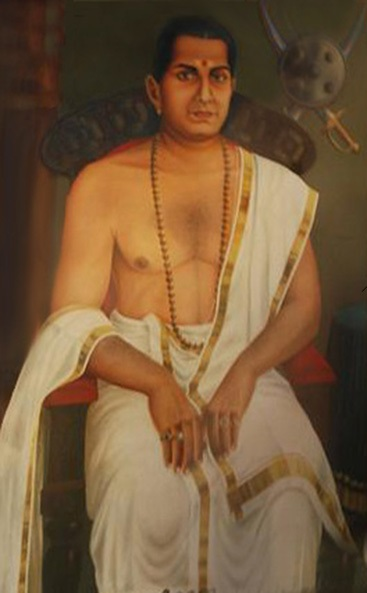
Veera Kerala Varma Pazhassi Raja Painting by Raja Ravi Varma

After the annexation of Malabar, the British called upon Thalassery, the royal families and other major Nair and Namboothiri feudal lords to return, but this was heavily opposed by some local rulers. Along with heavy taxation and laws that curbed free movement, the appeal resulted in multiple uprisings against the British with heavy casualties to British forces. Thousands of soldiers were killed, but the resistance was eventually defeated.

Pazhassi Raja was a member of the western branch of the Kottayam royal clan. He was an expert in guerrilla warfare, was a prominent resistance leader and led one of the earliest uprisings. His war strategy had devastating effects on the British army.

The Pazhassi war was the first major popular uprising against the British in Malabar. When Hyder occupied Malabar in 1773, the raja of Kottayam found political asylum in Travancore. Pazhassi Raja, the fourth prince in line for succession to the throne during this period, became one of the de facto heads of state, surpassing several elder royals. He fought a war of resistance against Hyder from 1774 to 1793.

On account of his refusal to flee and his resolve to fight invaders, the people of Kottayam supported the raja. His troops were drawn from the Nambiar, Thiyya and also tribal clans such as Kurichias and Mullukurumbas.

Major General Arthur Wellesley (one of the British commanders in the Battle of Waterloo and became the 1st Duke of Wellington), came to Thalassery to fight against Pazhassi Raja after defeating Tipu Sultan in the Battle of Sri Rangapatna.

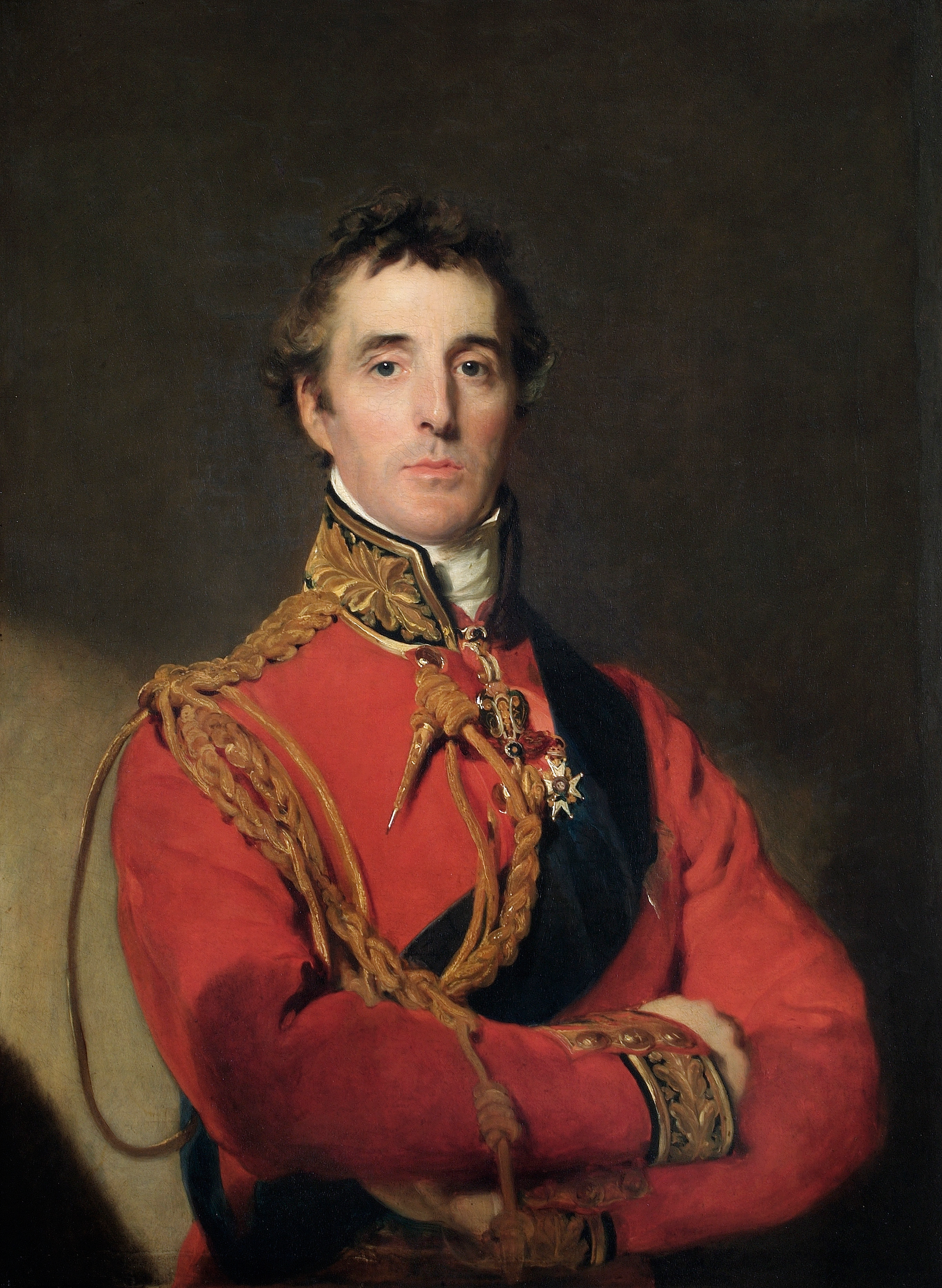
Sir Arthur Wellesley, 1st Duke of Wellington, chief of British forces during Pazhassi revolt that erupted in the region against the British in 1773

The war between the East India Company (led by Wellesley and Collector Thomas Harvey Baber), and Kottayam, led by Kerala Varma Pazhassi Raja) in the forests of Wayanad, caused immense damage. The forces of Kottayam defeated the company in several skirmishes. The company started bringing reinforcements, and, due to the fall of Tipu Sultan, the EIC was able to crush the revolt.

== Tellicherry British Naval Barracks ==
Thalassery hosted one of the British Navy's major naval barracks along the Arabian coast.

As a consequence of the treaty that followed the Seven Years' War (1756–1763) between Britain and France, they briefly refrained from military adventures, helping Tipu in his Malabar conquest. Upon concluding a treaty with Mysore, the British shifted most of their barracks to Tellicherry.

== The Tellicherry naval battle (1791) ==
In November 1791, three battleships anchored in Tellicherry – Minerva (a 38-gun frigate) led by Commodore William Cornwallis (later Governor General of Madras), Phoenix, a 36-gun frigate led by Captain Sir Richard John Strachan, and Perseverance, led by Captain Isaac Smith – confronted a French 36-gun frigate, Résolute, and a small convoy en route to Mangalore. The British sought to inspect the French vessels for military contraband. The British suspected that the shipments were for Tipu's army. The French resisted the search and a naval battle ensued. The British overpowered the French vessels, but found no contraband. The skirmishes resulted in a heavy loss of lives, both natives and Europeans. Commodore M. Saint Félix, of the French Navy came from Mahé in 40-gun frigate La Cybéle to Tellicherry and warned the British.

The incident had far-reaching consequences, damaging British/French relationships. His Majesty's Consul in Alexandria, Egypt, broadcast the information that France had declared war and all British and Dutch vessels had been seized by the French Navy in Indian seas. The information reached Fort St. George in Calcutta and Fort William in Bengal and war was declared to capture French territories across India. Cybéle and Minerva fought another battle in Pondicherry, which had not ceded to Britain. Lt.Col. James Hartley commanded the expedition that captured Mahé from the French.

== La Preneuse ambush (1798) ==
On 19 April 1798, HCS Raymond and HCS Woodcote, both stationed at Tellicherry port, were attacked and captured by the French frigate Preneuse (1794). La Preneuse was carrying two of Tipu Sultan's ambassadors, returning from an embassy to the French authorities on the Isle de France. These ambassadors had been trying to gain support for Tipu Sultan, and to co-ordinate plans for future joint operations between the French and Tipu's forces.

Embarking from Isle de France on 7 March 1798, the La Preneuse, with one hundred French officers and fifty private soldiers, was intended to provide instructors and advisors to Tipu Sultan's army. Her destination was Mangalore. This incident provided the English with a pretext and reason to resume their attack on Tipu Sultan, which led to the fall of Seringapatam in 1799.

This incident demonstrated the defencelessness of shipping in Tellicherry anchorage. A decision was taken to move the settlement's main function and garrison to Cannanore. This began the steady decline of Tellicherry. In 1814 Mahé was again occupied by French forces, as part of the first (1814) treaty of the "Treaties of Paris, (1814–15)", Mahé then remained under French control until India's independence.

== Indian Nationalist Movement ==
The Indian National Congress (Congress) political organization was established in 1885. It became the center point of the Indian Nationalist Movement. In 1908 a district Congress committee was formed in Thalassery. V K Krishna Menon, who studied in Tellicherry, was an active member of the Tellicherry branch (started in 1916) of the All Indian Home Rule Movement founded by Annie Besant. Mahatma Gandhi once had a conversation with locals in Thalassery railway station, along with Shaukat Ali in 1934 en route to Kozhikode to attend Khilafat gathering. Notable local freedom fighters include S L Prabhu, Kamala Prabhu, Mukund Maller, Dr. T V N Nair, T N Govindan Adiyodi, Sardar Chandroth Kunjiraman Nair, K P Raghavan Nair, N P Damodaran, and Adv. P Kunjiraman.
