= Karthyayani Amma =

Indian woman (1922–2023)

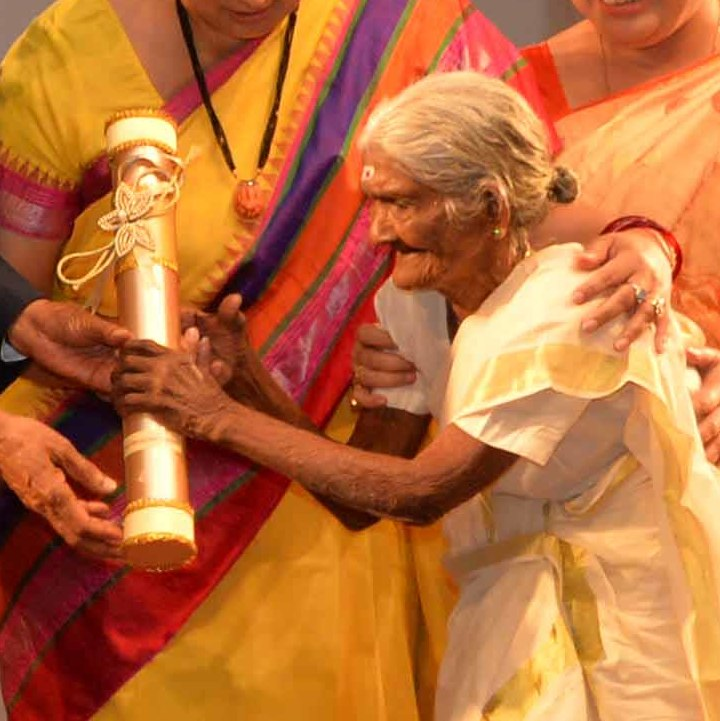
- Amma in 2020
- Born: c. 1922; Cheppad, Haripad, Travancore, India
- Died: 10 October 2023 (aged 101); Alappuzha, Kerala, India
- Known for: Passing a literacy exam at 96
- Children: 6
- Awards: Nari Shakti Puraskar

Karthyayani Amma (c. 1922 – 10 October 2023) was an Indian woman who passed a literacy examination with top marks at the age of 96. She received the Nari Shakti Puraskar award, the highest civilian award for a woman, by the government of India.

== Early life ==
Karthyayani Amma was born c. 1922. She was from Cheppad, Haripad in the state of Kerala in India. As a child she had to work and therefore stopped attending school. She married and had six children, working as a street sweeper and maid. She was a vegetarian who rose at 04:00 every morning.

== Fame ==
By 2018, Karthyayani Amma was living at the Laksham Veedu Colony, a social housing facility for elderly people. She was inspired to take a learning course by her daughter, who had passed an examination at the age of sixty. In August 2018, she took an examination alongside 40,362 other people, as part of the Kerala State Literacy Mission Authority's Aksharalaksham ("Million Letter") programme. She was the oldest person to take the test in her district. She had been given lessons in reading and writing by her great-grandchildren, who were nine and twelve years old.

Tested on reading, writing and mathematics, Karthyayani Amma scored 98 out of a possible 100 marks, giving her the top grade. She commented afterwards "I learned so much for no reason. The tests were way too easy for me". After her success in the examination, Karthyayani Amma became a national celebrity: film star Manju Warrier met her during Diwali; C. Raveendranath (the Keralan education minister) gave her a laptop; Pinarayi Vijayan, chief minister of Kerala, gave her a certificate of merit. She told The Economic Times that her ambition was to pass the next level examination at the age of 100.

Karthyayani Amma became a Commonwealth of Learning Goodwill Ambassador in 2019. In March 2020, she was honoured with the Nari Shakti Puraskar 2019 award, presented by Ram Nath Kovind, the president of India. Amma had never flown before but she was reassured by a former awardee M.S. Sunil days before she flew to the Presidential Palace in Delhi. Another recipient of the award was fellow Keralan Bhageerathi Amma, who at 105 is the oldest person to have passed an Aksharalaksham examination.

Inspired by her story, Vikas Khanna made a documentary called Barefoot Empress, which chronicled her journey and spirit.

Amma died in Alappuzha, Kerala on 10 October 2023, at the age of 101.
