= Elanthoor =

- village
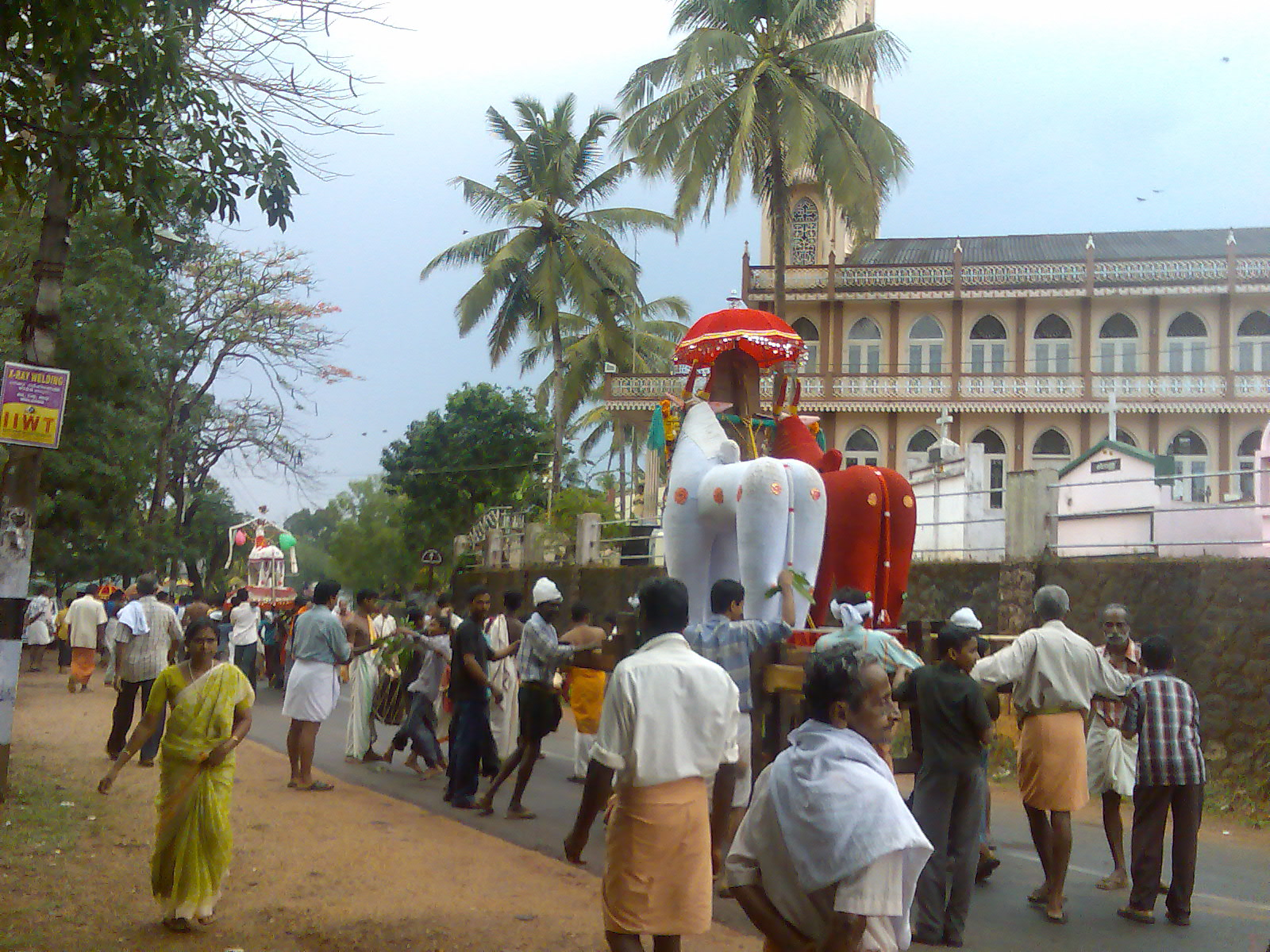
- Bhagavathi Hill Festival, Elanthoor St. Peter's Orthodox Church (Karoor Pally) in the background

- Location in Kerala, India
- Coordinates: 9°17′0″N 76°43′0″E
- Country: India
- State: Kerala
- District: Pathanamthitta

Government
  - Type: Block Panchayat

Population (2011)
  - Total: 15,344

Languages
  - Official: Malayalam, English
- Time zone: UTC+5:30 (IST)
- PIN: 689643
- Telephone code: 0468
- Vehicle registration: KL-03
- Vidhan Sabha constituency: Aranmula
- Climate: moderate (Köppen)

Elanthoor (Malayalam: [ilɐn̪d̪uːr]) is a village in the Pathanamthitta district of southern Kerala, India. It is situated approximately halfway between Kozhencherry and Pathanamthitta.

Historically, the area formed part of the Kingdoms of Travancore and Venadu. Before the formation of the Pathanamthitta district on 1 November 1982, the village was part of the former Kollam district.

== Demographics ==
As of the 2011 India census, Elanthoor had a population of 15,344 with 7135 males and 8209 females.

== Location ==
Elanthoor is located between Pathanamthitta and Kozhencherry. The T. K. Road (Thiruvalla-Pathanamthitta-Kumbazha Road / SH - 07) connects Elanthoor to major towns. The village is easily accessible from the Main Eastern Highway passing through Pathanamthitta.

Nearest Police Stations: Elavumthitta (6 km), Aranmula (8.6 km), Pathanamthitta (8.6 km)

Nearest Railway Station: Chengannur (CNGR) at approximately 18 km

Airports: Trivandrum International Airport (approximately 115 km)

== Gandhi's Visit ==
Mahatma Gandhi toured Travancore in 1937 with the culmination of the Temple Entry Movement. During the tour which Gandhi preferred to call a "pilgrimage", he visited Elanthoor as well at the invitation of K. Kumar, known as Kumarji. Kumarji, known also as Travancore Kumar, was considered famous personality of the bygone era. He was a veteran freedom fighter and was among the closest of Gandhi's disciples and associates in Kerala. In his speech, Gandhi described Elanthoor as a model village. He exemplified the historic work done in the region to admit Dalits into temples even before the Temple Entry Proclamation. Gandhi said in his speech, " I tender you my congratulations for having of your own initiative got rid of untouchability even before the issue of the proclamation. The proclamation now sets the steal of approval upon your work and makes your work acceptable to the whole of Travancore".

After the speech, Kumarji introduced Khadar Das TP Gopala Pillai and Pulinthitta PC George to the Gandhi. Gandhi scribbled a message on a piece of paper for Gopala Pillai which became an inspiration to him to take to Khadi.

== Notable personalities ==
- Meera Jasmine, actress
- K. Kumar, Gandhian activist, social reformer and Chief Editor of Swadeshabhimani newspaper previously edited by Swadeshabhimani Ramakrishna Pillai
- Mohanlal, actor
