= Aladangady =

Aladangady Arva, Anemahal Akshaya Pura
- village
- Country: India
- State: Karnataka

Population
  - Total: 10,000 to 15,000

Languages
  - Official: Kannada
- Time zone: UTC+5:30 (IST)
- Postal code: 574207

Aladangady or Aladangadi is a small town in the Belthangady taluk of the Dakhina Kannada district in Karnataka, India located on the road connecting Guruvayanakere and Karkala.

== Features ==
About 5 kilometres (3.1 mi) from Guruvayanakere and 9 9 kilometres (5.6 mi) from Belthangady, the town is a junction of four roads with many shops, hotels, and a market. It is at the centre of Sulkere Mogru, Shirlal Aladangady, Sulabettu, Pilya, and Navara. It has greenery adorned on all four of its sides and is surrounded by many rivers. It was once part of forest land visited regularly by tigers, cheetahs, and other wild animals.

Chieftains ruled the town and adjoining areas till independence. The area is famous for Yakshagana Mela, a kind of Tulu musical drama, with a Yakshagana troupe based there. There is also a world-famous Kambala (Bafallow Race Course) which conducts yearly race competitions. The town has one church – St. Peter Claver Church for Roman Catholics. There are many Hindu temples, mosques, and one Jain temple. Other popular places include Aladangady Temple, Aladangady Aramane, Jnana Marga, the Society Building, and Para Pente (Old Street). It has both public and private education institutions.

The mode of transport there are bicycles, cars, two-wheelers, and buses (public transport). The town is well connected to towns such as Naravi, Venur, Belthangady, Guruvayanakere, Mudabidri, Karkala, and the major cities of Tulu Nadu, Kudla and Udupi.

=== Baraya Palace ===
The Baraya Palace, is an abandoned (but well preserved) structure at Aladangady in the middle of a jungle, located about 60 km from Mangalore, which belonged to the Jain Ajila Kings of Aladangady. It is about 900 years old, built with mud walls and had a thatched roof, which was replaced by Mangalore Tiles about a century ago, and is maintained by the present heirs of the Jain Ajila Kings. There is ornamental woodwork both inside and outside the palace, with 8 carved pillars, facing each other in 2 rows and supporting 4 solid wood beams.

=== Aladangady Aramane (Ajila Palace) ===
The Ajila Jain Bunt Dynasty ruled the principality of Venur for several centuries, 1154 to 1786 C.E. The most notable of the Ajila kings was Veera Timmannarasa Ajila IV who erected the monolith of Bahubali in 1604 C.E. The succession to the Ajila throne was as per the Bunt custom of matrilineal inheritance (Aliya Santana).

The descendants of the Ajila rulers still survive and inhabit the Aladangady Aramane (Ajila Palace). The present head of the Ajila dynasty is Padmaprasad Ajila, fourteenth in line through the matrilineal lineage of Veera Timmannarasa Ajila IV.

=== The population ===
Although the official name is Aladangady, the place is being addressed with many names such as Anemahal and Arva to name a few. Languages spoken are Tulu Konkani and Byari Bashe, and Literacy rate of this town with a population of 30,000 is 95 percent. Hinduism, Islam, Christianity, and Jainism are the religions practised by people and other religions are not commonly practiced here. The religious groups coexist peacefully. It has a Grama Panchayat with election every once in four years.

Popular festivals are Ganesh Chaturthi, Krishnastami, Deepavali for Hindus, Ramzan for Muslims, Christmas, Easter and Mother Mary's Feast Day for Christians.

The local diet consists of rice, vegetarian dishes, meat, and fish. Breakfast includes dose, Idli, Mutlim, Appam, mandas, soyo, pathrade, bakri, and panpale. Beverages include tea, coffee, and juices, and snacks include goli baje, bitten rice, sajjige, and onion baje.

== Economy ==
Most of the youth from the area migrate to other cities of India in search of jobs and better opportunities. Livelihood is agriculture and agro products involve both commercial and non-commercial products such as rice, betal nut, coconut, coca, mango, fruits and rubber, and poultry.

== See also ==
- Jain Bunt
- Ajila
- Venur
- [ Aladangady Hindu temple]
