= Gommatagiri =

- village
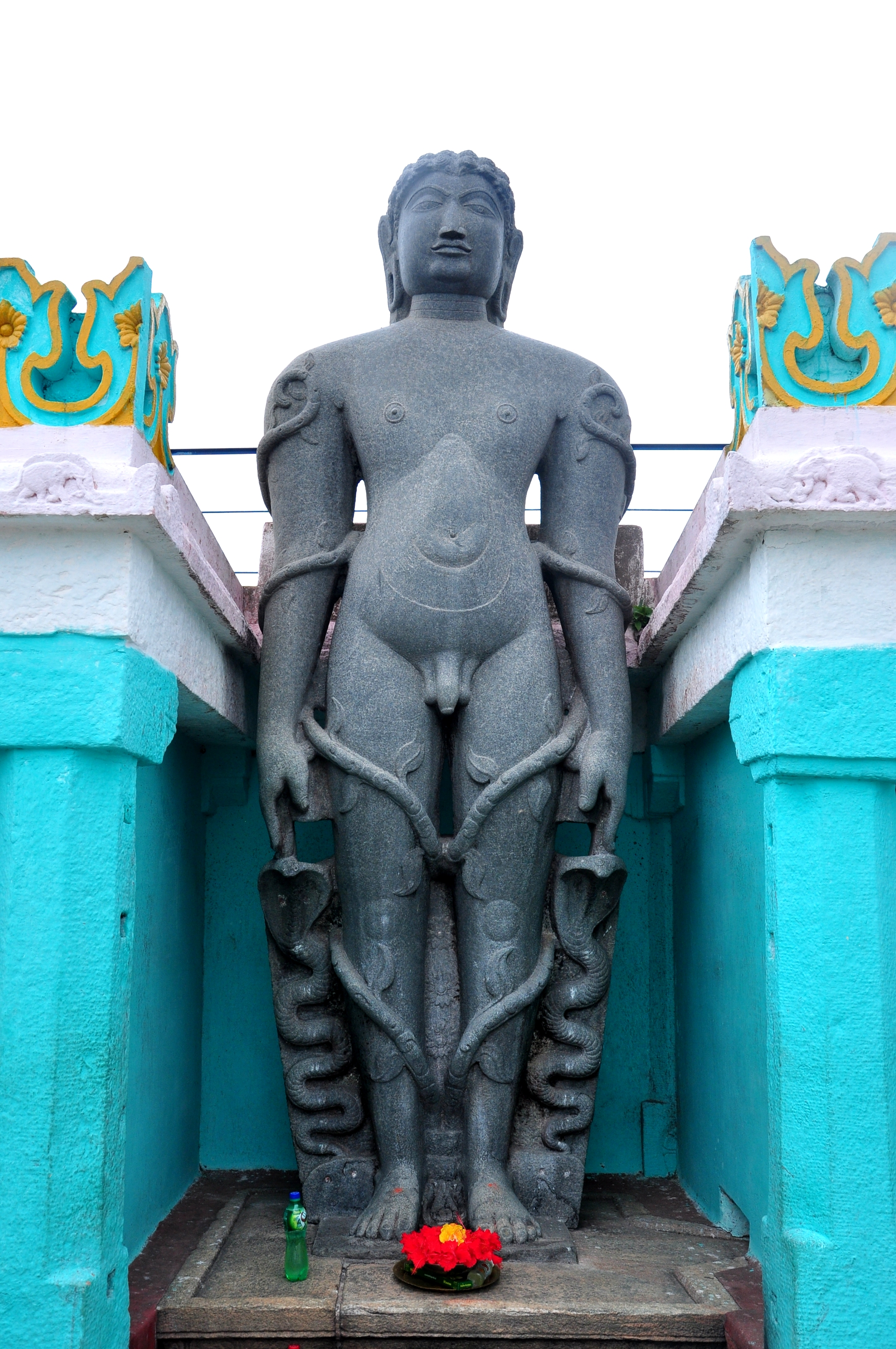
- Statue of Bahubali at Gommatagiri

- Location in Karnataka, India Gommatagiri (India)
- Coordinates: 12.370201°N 76.4873689°E
- Country: India
- State: Karnataka
- District: Mysore District

Languages
  - Official: Kannada
- Time zone: UTC+5:30 (IST)

Gommatagiri is about 20 km from Mysore. Gommatagiri is situated in Bilikere hobli of Hunsur taluk in Mysore district in Karnataka state, India.

== Overview ==
Gommatagiri is an acclaimed Jain centre. The 700-year-old statue of Bahubali (also known as Gomateshwara) is erected atop a 50-meter-tall (160 ft) hillock called 'Shravana Gudda'. The statue of Gomateshwara at Gommatagiri is an early Vijayanagara creation in granite. It has serene facial expressions and curly hairs. This Jain centre attracts many pilgrims during the annual "Maha masthakabhisekha" in September. The local Jains have a belief that the entire region was a bastion of Jainism at least since the 2nd Century BC.

The 20 feet statue at Gommatagiri is very similar to Gommateshwara statue in Shravanabelagola (58 feet) except that it is dwarfed in size. Historians attribute the statue to an early Vijayanagar period.

== Risks ==
However, the statue at Gommatagiri is in danger of being irretrievably damaged due to quarrying, and the explosions triggered off in the region have resulted in cracks at the base of the statue. The joints supporting the hillock have widened because of the blasts and the hillock needs to be strengthened by providing "abetment" from the western side.

== Photo gallery ==
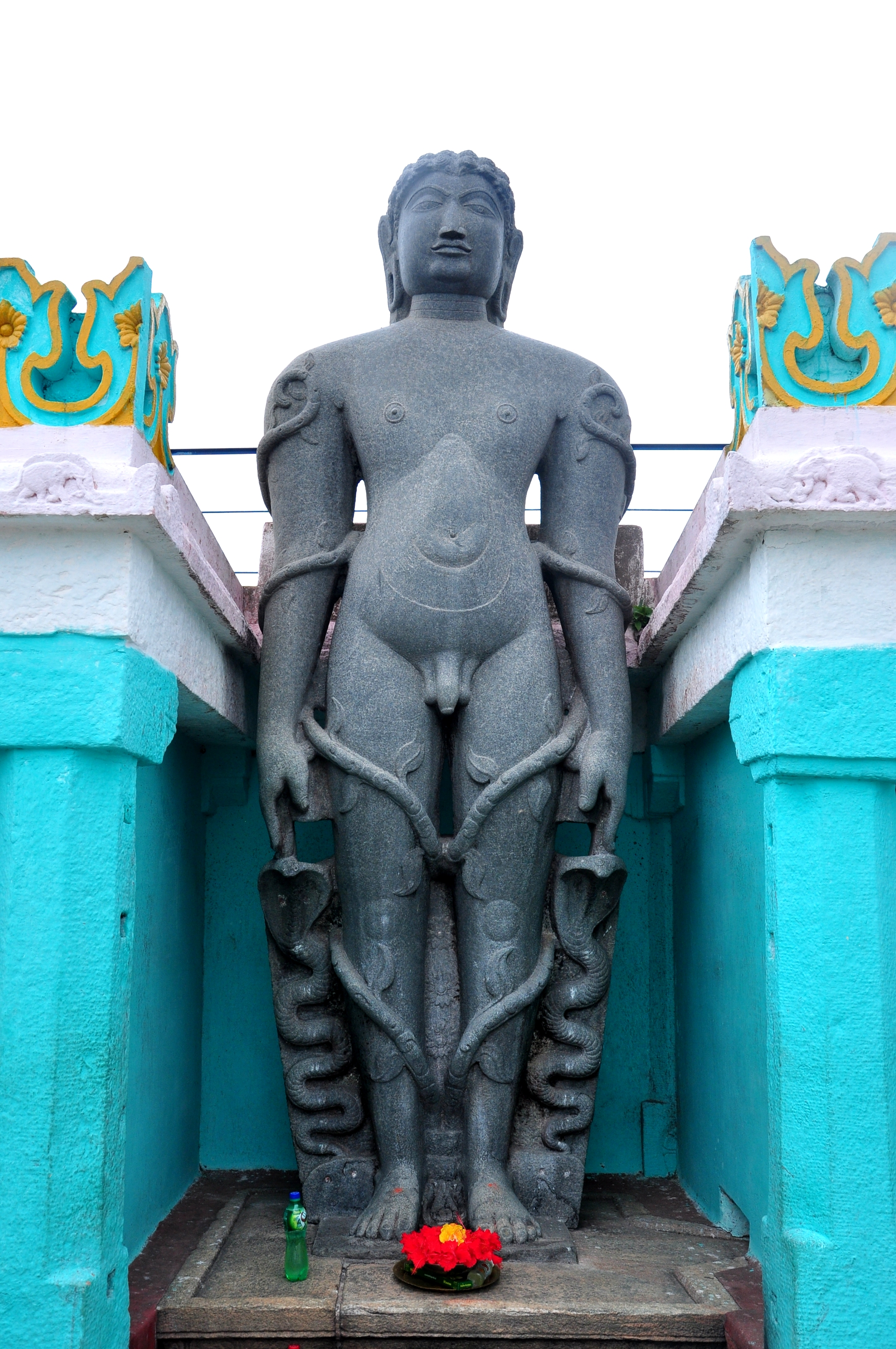
Statue of Bahubali at Gommatagiri

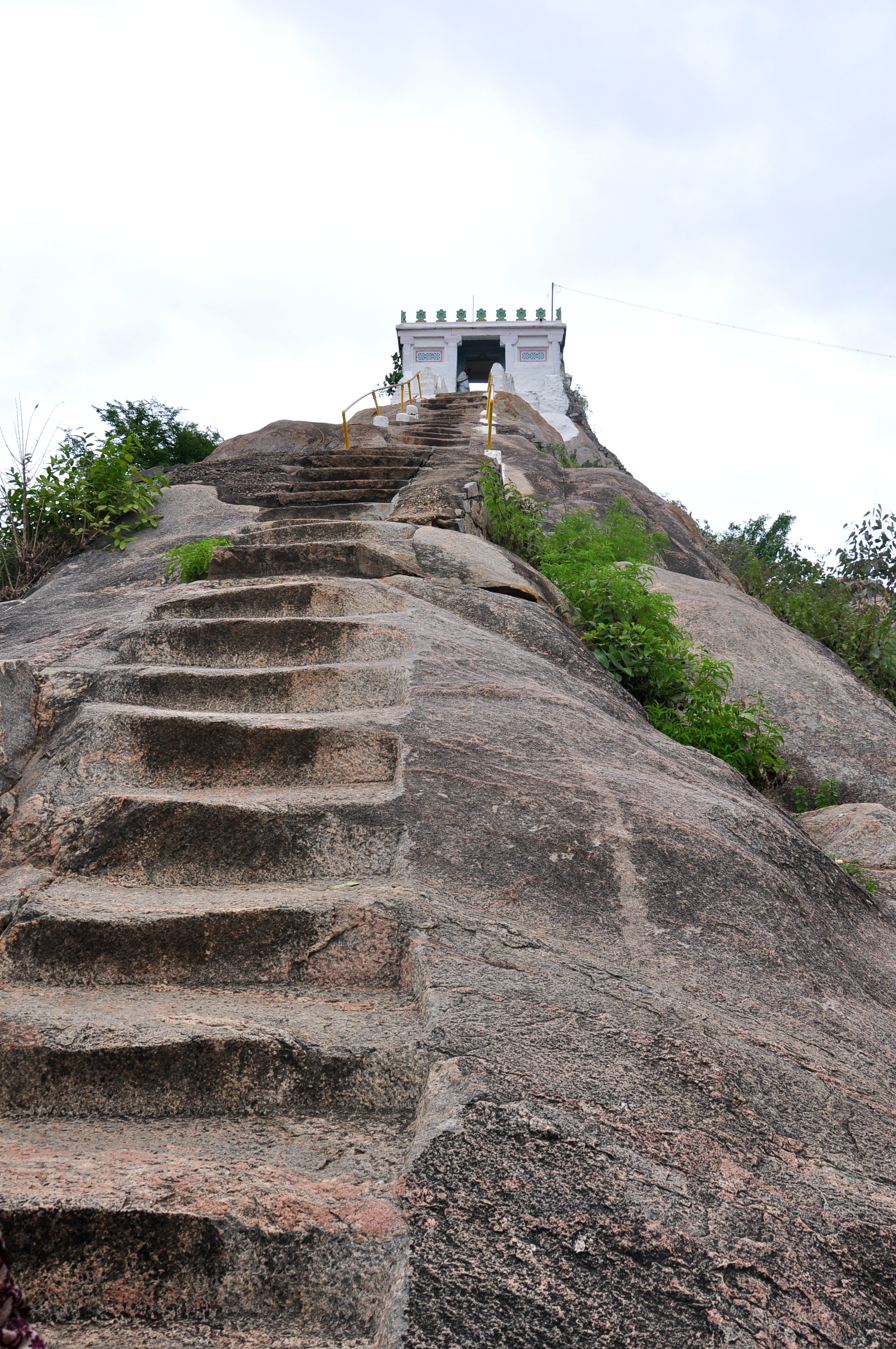
The stairs of the Bahubali Jain temple at Gommatagiri

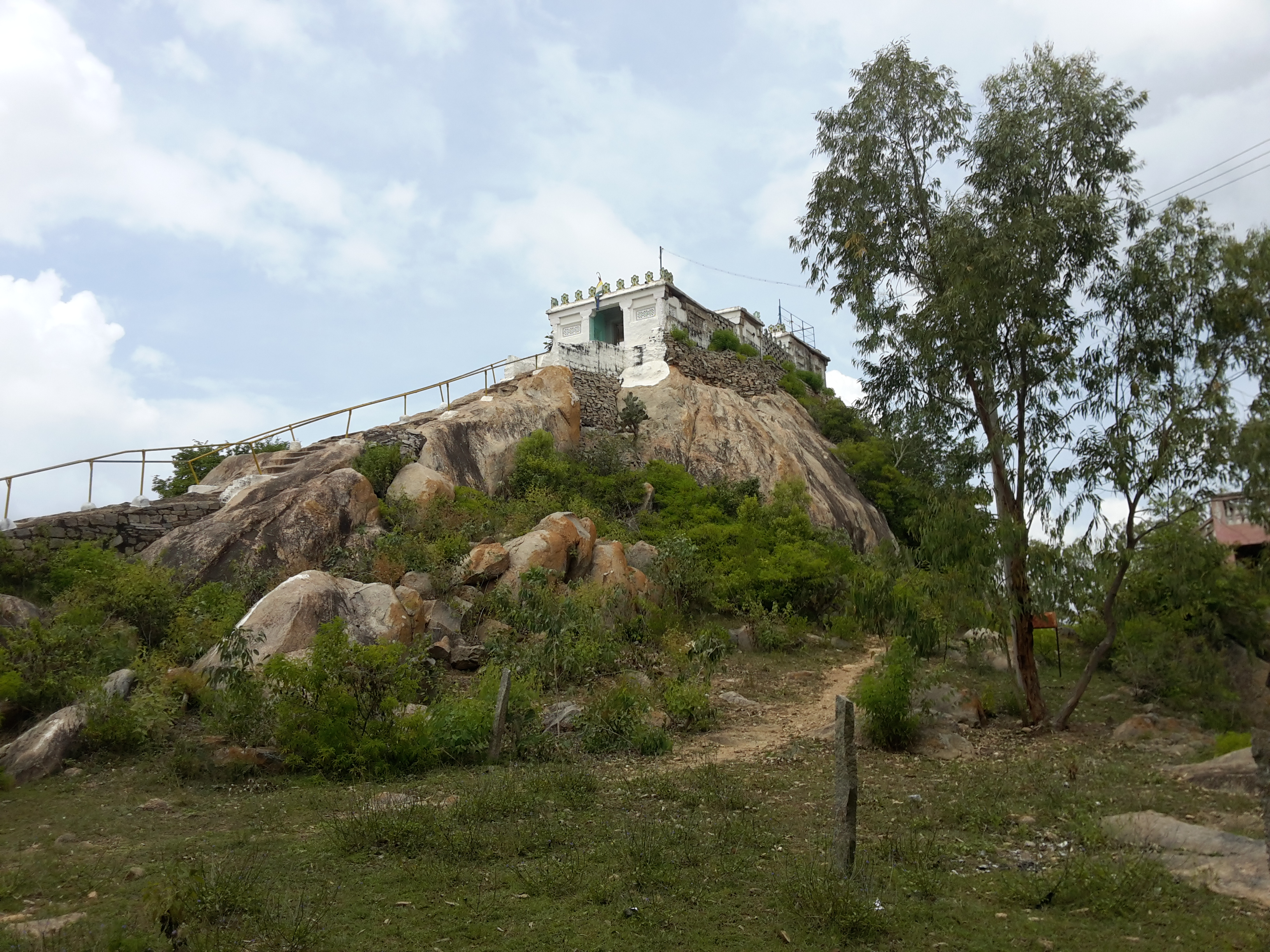
Shravana Gudda - the hillock on which Bahubali statue is located

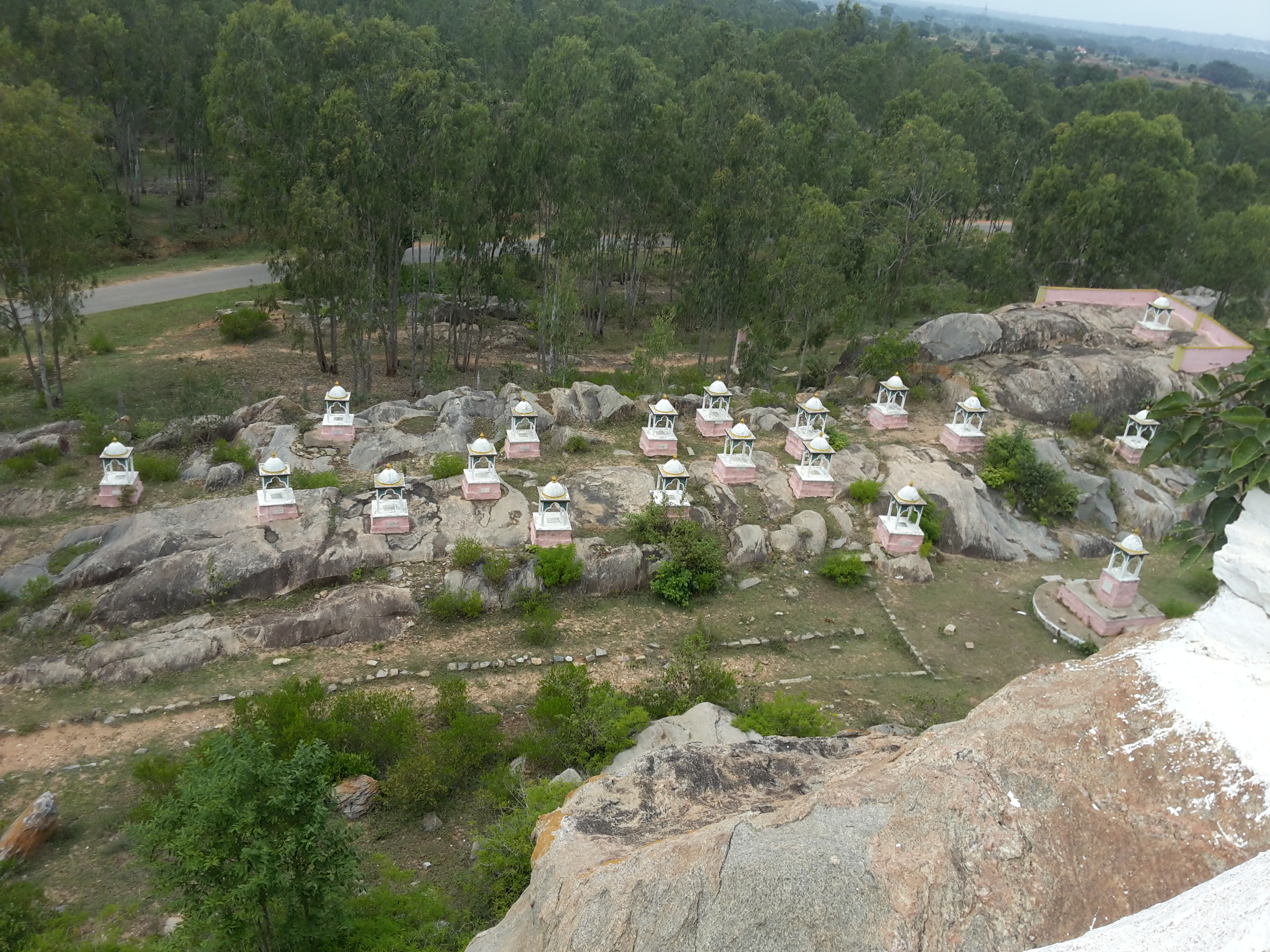
Tirtankar beside Shravana Gudda

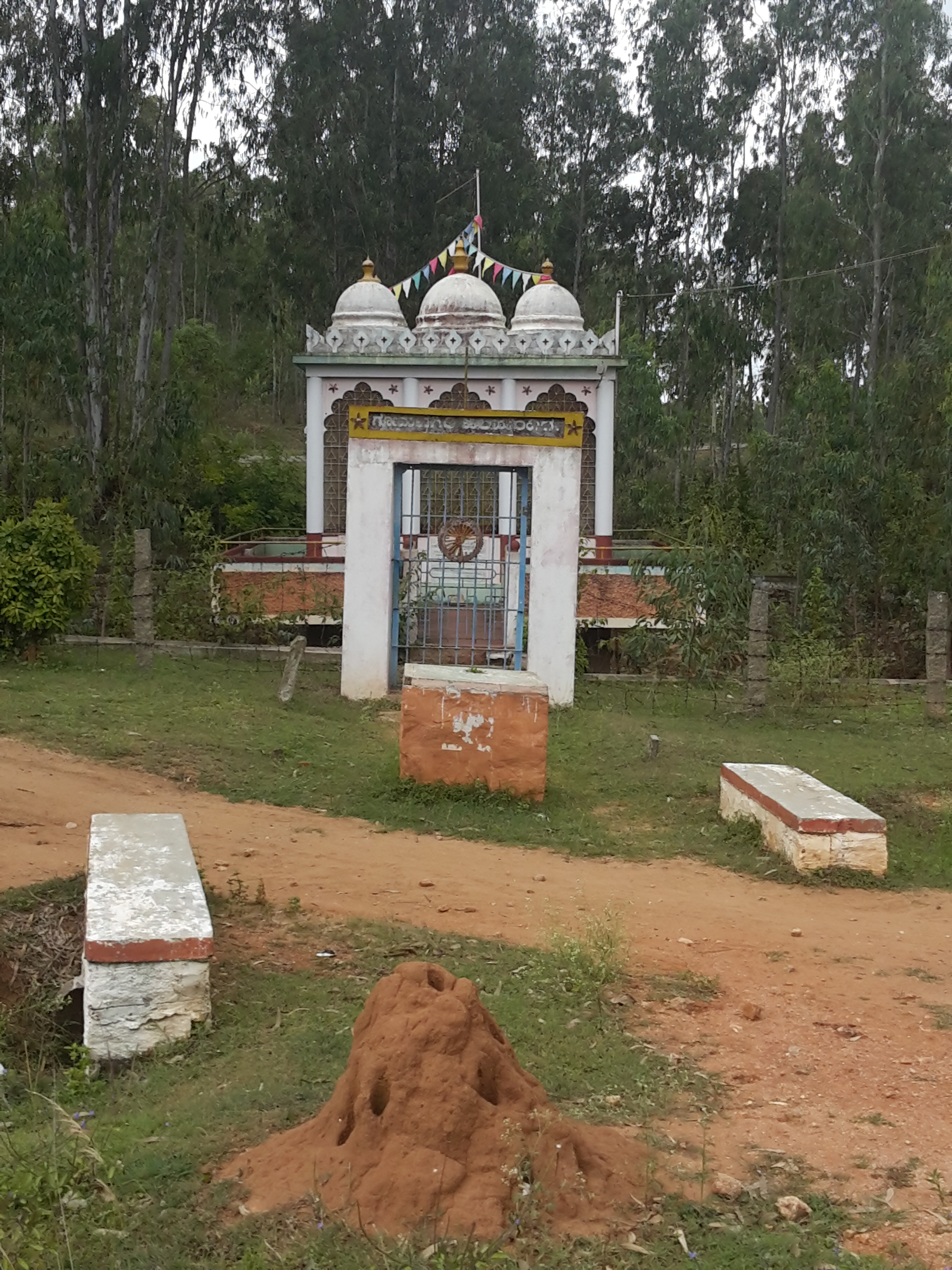
Gommatagiri - kalyanamantapa or marriage hall

== See also ==
- Jainism in Karnataka
- Jainism in Tulu Nadu
- Jainism in North Karnataka
- Jain art
