= Jain Bunt =

Jainists of Bunt caste from Tulunaad, India

The Jain Bunt are the Jains of Bunt caste from Tulunaad area of India. They have a feudal and martial race heritages, because of ties to the erstwhile royalty of the area. They are classified as Other Backward Class (OBC) by the Government of Karnataka.

== Origin ==
A section of Bunts believe that they were originally Jains who later became a caste group.

== Tradition ==
Achieving moksha or liberation is the highest goal of life for the Jains. Jain monastics and renouncers of worldly life are highly revered, especially Bahubali, a king who turned into an ascetic. His virtues are greatly extolled in legends. Huge, monolithic statues have been erected by the Jain Bunts in his honor throughout their recorded history. The oldest among them is located in Karkala. Standing about 42 feet tall, it was erected by the Jain Bunt as per the wishes of a pontiff named Lalitakeerti in 1432. Another statue of Bahubali standing about 35 feet was erected in Venur in 1604 by the Jain Bunt ruler Timma Ajila. The most recently erected statue lies in Dharmasthala and is about 39 feet tall. Mahamastakabhisheka rituals are held once in 12 years at the site of these statues. Jain temples, called basadi and derasar, are numerous in the region and were built by various Jain Bunt rulers. The most famous among them is the Saavira Kambada Basadi located in Moodabidri. Jain Bunts are strict vegetarians and do not consume anything after sunset or eat root vegetables.

== Matrilineality ==
Matrilineality is a unique social system of "Aliyasantana" observed among various other Jain and Bunt communities, and one notable example is the Jain Bunts. This system, practiced by the Jains even to this day, revolves around a distinctive approach to inheritance, property ownership, and marital arrangements.

In the context of matrilineality among the Jain, an intriguing pattern emerges where the wife plays a central role in matters of property and inheritance. Unlike many traditional systems where property and inheritance are primarily passed down through the male line, among the Jain’s, it is the wife who inherits both land and property. This practice reflects a significant departure from conventional societal norms, highlighting the importance of the female lineage in shaping the community's social and economic fabric.

Furthermore, matrilineality among the Jains also influences the dynamics of marriage. In this unique system, upon marriage, the husband becomes a part of his wife's household. This contrasts with the more common practice of a wife moving to her husband's family residence. By embracing matrilineality, the Jain’s challenge the conventional gender roles and familial structures prevalent in many societies, showcasing an alternative approach to family and community cohesion.

== See also ==
- Jainism in Karnataka
