= Ajila =

Ajila Empire
- c. 1154 CE–c. 1786 CE
- Status: Empire
- Capital: Venur
- Religion: Jainism
- History
  - Established: c. 1154 CE
  - Disestablished: c. 1786 CE

Ajila is a common surname of the Jain’s the landed gentry of the Tulu Nadu region in the south west of India. It is believed that the founder of this community was named Ajila. It is also the name of the Jain dynasty who ruled the principality of Venur for several centuries (1154 to 1786 C.E). The most notable Ajila king was Veera Timmannarasa Ajila IV.

== Architecture ==
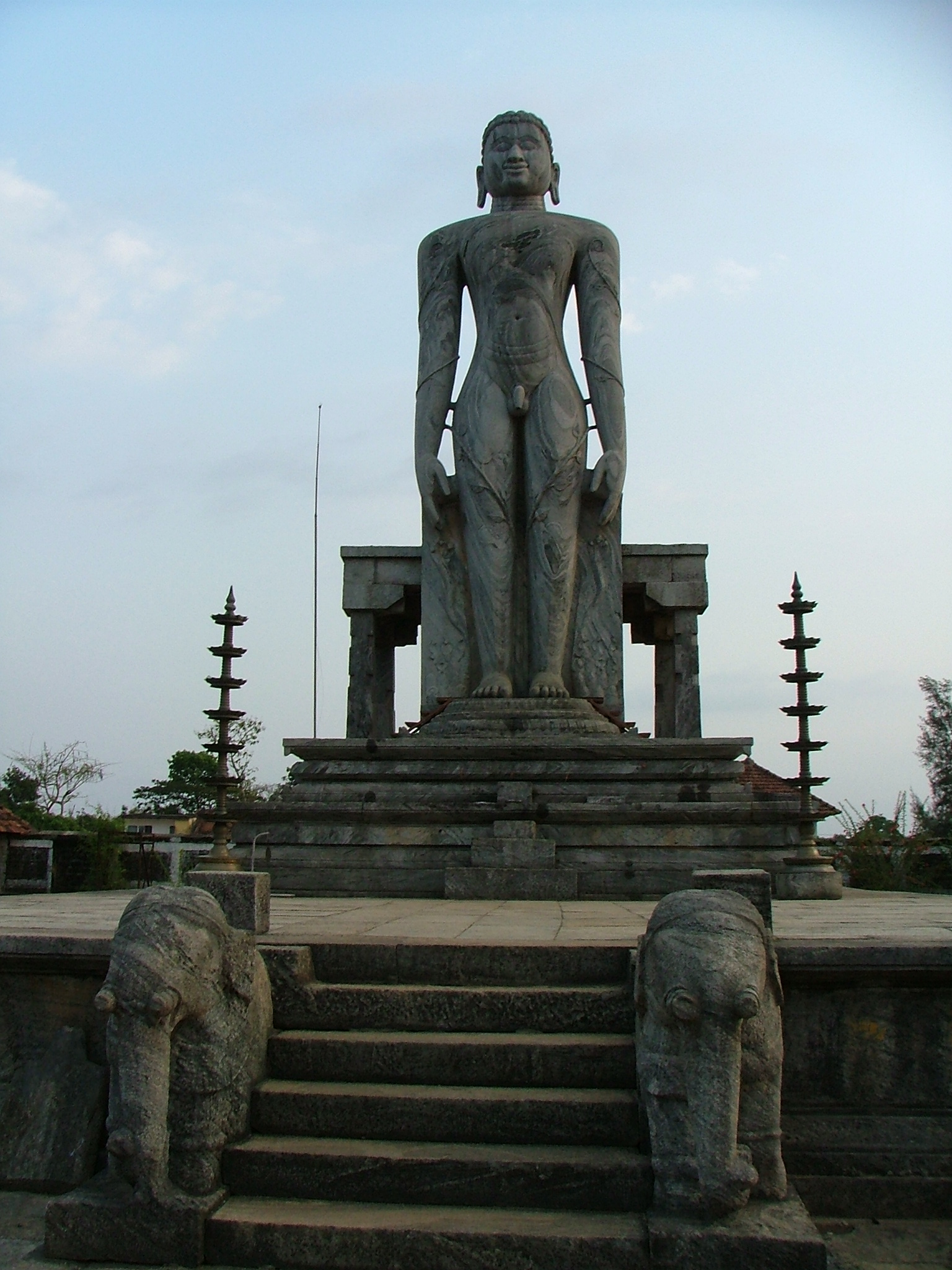
Bahubali in Venur, 38 feet (12 m) monolith statue, erected by Veera Timmannarasa Ajila IV

The monolith of Bahubali in Venur was erected by Ajila kings Veera Timmannarasa Ajila IV in 1604 C.E. The descendants of the Ajila rulers still survive and inhabit the Aladangady Aramane (Ajila Palace). An inscription in Old Kannada by Veera Timmannarasa Ajila IV unearthed in 2006 reads

On Saturday, the seventh day of Kanya month in Vikari Samvatsara, the Ajila king, Swasthi Shri Mahamandalika Somanatha Perunana Salva Shri Veera Thimmaraja Wodeya made a regulation for his 3,000 followers that they should perpetuate the grant of pepper made by him to his traditional tenants. They should also maintain the grants made to the Bunts of the palace. They and the merchants who has settled in the kingdom must attend the ‘Brahmotsava’ ceremony in the temple of Aladangadi. Neglecting this regulation is equal to neglecting the tradition and also the four deities of Aruvu, Shri Somanatha, Shri Shanthishwara of Venur.

== Present status ==
The succession to the Ajila throne was as per the Jain custom of matrilineal inheritance (Aliyasantana). The present head of the Ajila dynasty is Padmaprasad Ajila, fourteenth in line through the matrilineal lineage of Veera Timmannarasa Ajila IV. who is still following Jainism.

== See also ==
- Jain Bunt
- Venur
