= Venur =

Venur(Venoor)
- Village
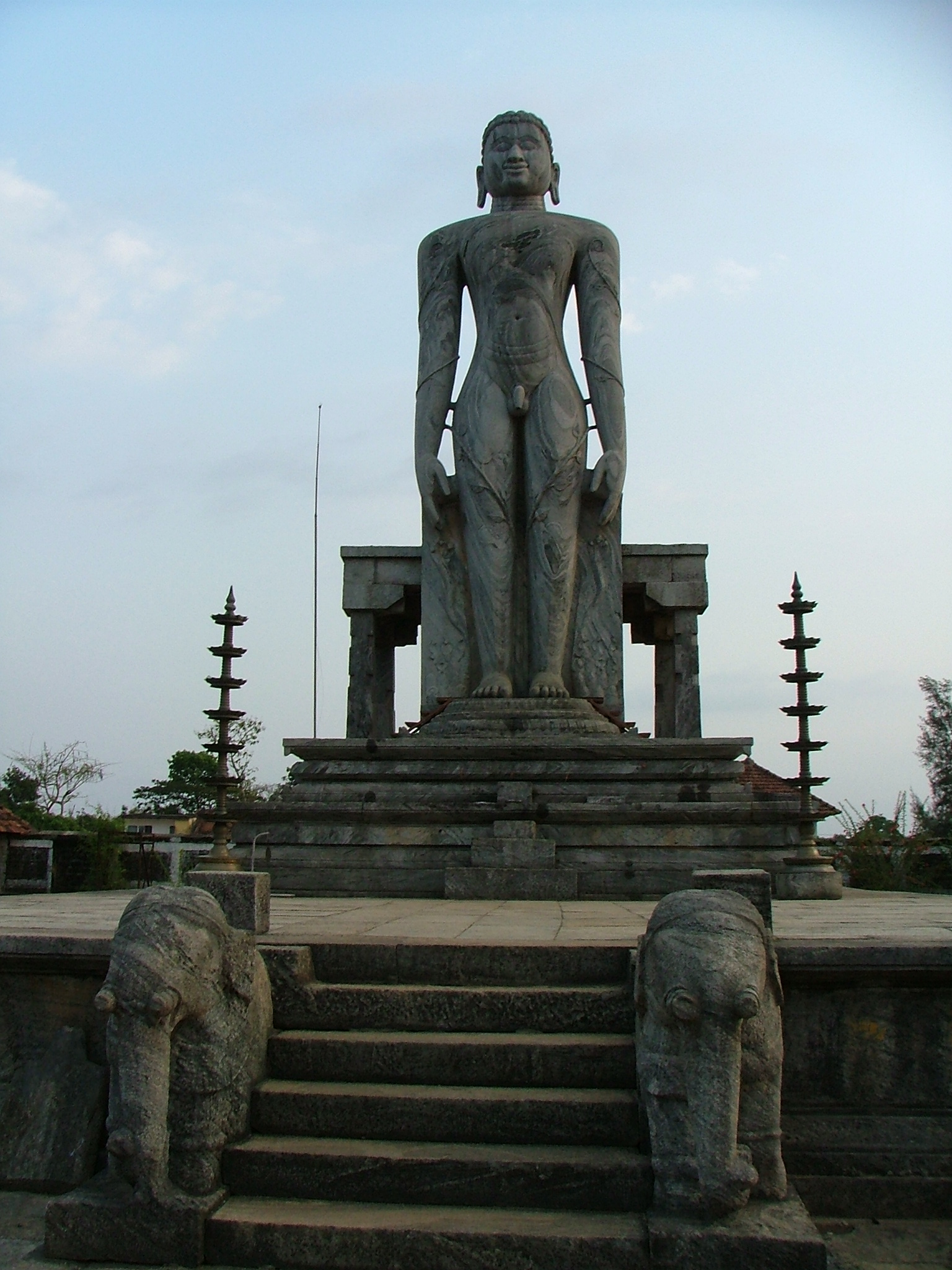
- Monolith of Bahubali in Venur

- Location in Karnataka, India Venur(Venoor) (India)
- Coordinates: 13.01°N 75.08°E
- Country: India
- District: Dakshina Kannada

Government
  - Body: Gram panchayat

Languages
  - Official: Tulu, Kannada
- Time zone: UTC+5:30 (IST)
- ISO 3166 code: IN-KA
- Vehicle registration: KA-70
- Nearest city: Belthangadi
- Website: www.venur.in

Venur or Vēnooru is a small village on the banks of the Phalguni river in Belthangady Taluk, Dakshina Kannada district of Karnataka, India. It was once the seat of Jainism and the capital of the Ajila Dynasty. It is on the Dharmasthala-Moodabidri-Karkala route on the coastal religious circuit in the Karnataka State of India.

== Ajila Dynasty ==
Venur is a small town in Dakshina Kannada District of Karnataka state situated on the bank of river Phalguni. Venur, though a small town, was once a great seat of Jainism. It was the capital of the Ajila Dynasty and one of the most prominent Kings of then Thimmanna Ajila built a colossus of Gommateshwara 38 feet high in 1604 AD. He was a direct descendant of Chamundaraya, who built one at Shravanabelagola. Venur colossus is the shortest of all the three Gommateshwaras within the radius of 250 kilometres (160 mi) around it. It also stands in an enclosure, on the same pattern as that of Shravanabelagola. The Kings of Ajila Dynasty ruled here from 1154 AD to 1786 AD. The current descendant of the Ajila Dynasty is Thimmnnarasa Dr. Padmaprasad Ajila.

== Bahubali Statue ==
Venur's claim to fame is the monolith of Bhagawan Bahubali also known as Lord Gomateshwara. The single rock statue is 38 feet (12 m) in height and was erected by the Jain ruler Timmanna Ajila in the year 1604. The statue is supposed to have been sculptured by Beeru kalkuda. The statue stands facing westward on a high platform on the banks of the river Phalguni. This statue of Bahubali is one of the five giant monoliths (of the same Jain monk) found in Karnataka, which are more than 20 feet (6.1 m) in height. (the others being at Shravanabelagola, Karkala, Dharmasthala, and Gommatagiri).
