= Bahubali =

Legendary figure in Jainism

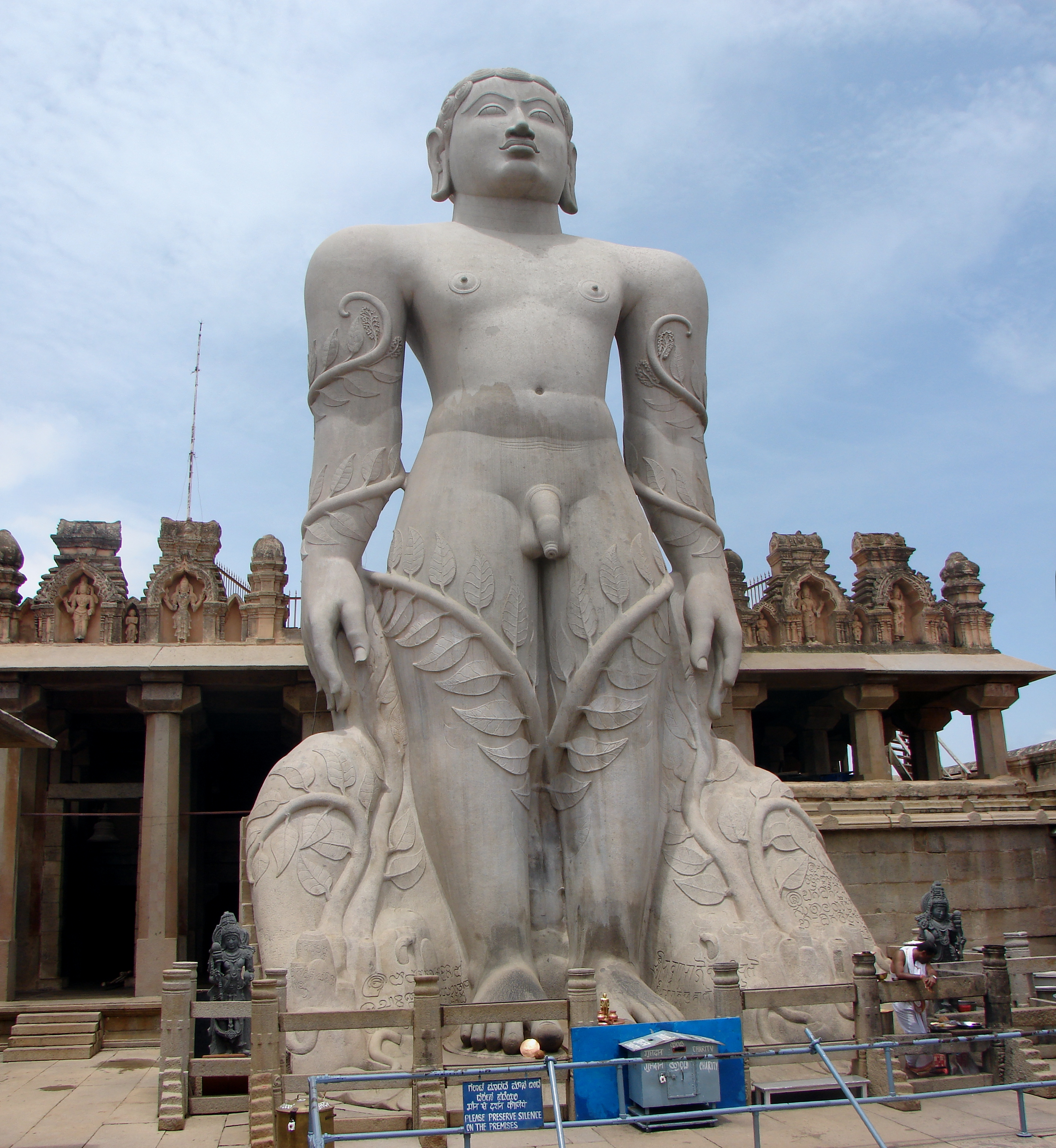
- The 57-foot (17-m) high Gommateshwara statue at Shravanabelagola, was built in c. 983 CE
- Other names: Gommateshwara, Kammateshwara
- Affiliation: Jainism
- Height: 57 feet (17 metres)

Genealogy
- Born: Ayodhya
- Died: Ashtapada
- Parents: Rishabha (father); Sunandā (mother)
- Siblings: Sundarī (sister) • Bharata, Nimi, and 97 other (half-brothers) • Brāhmī (half-sister)
- Children: Mahābala Somakīrti or Somayaśa (son)

Bahubali (IAST: Bāhubalī, lit. 'one with strong arms') was the son of Rishabhanatha (the first tirthankara of Jainism) and the brother of the chakravartin Bharata. He is a revered figure in Jainism. He is said to have meditated motionless for 12 years in a standing posture (kayotsarga), with climbing plants having grown around his legs. After his 12 years of meditation, he is said to have attained omniscience (kevala jnana).

Bahubali's other names are Kammateshwara and Gommateshwara, the namesake of the Gommateshwara statue dedicated to him.

== Legends ==
The Adipurana, a 9th-century Sanskrit poem, deals with the ten lives of the first tirthankara, Rishabhanatha and his two sons Bharata and Bahubali. It was composed by Jinasena, a Digambara monk.

=== Family life ===
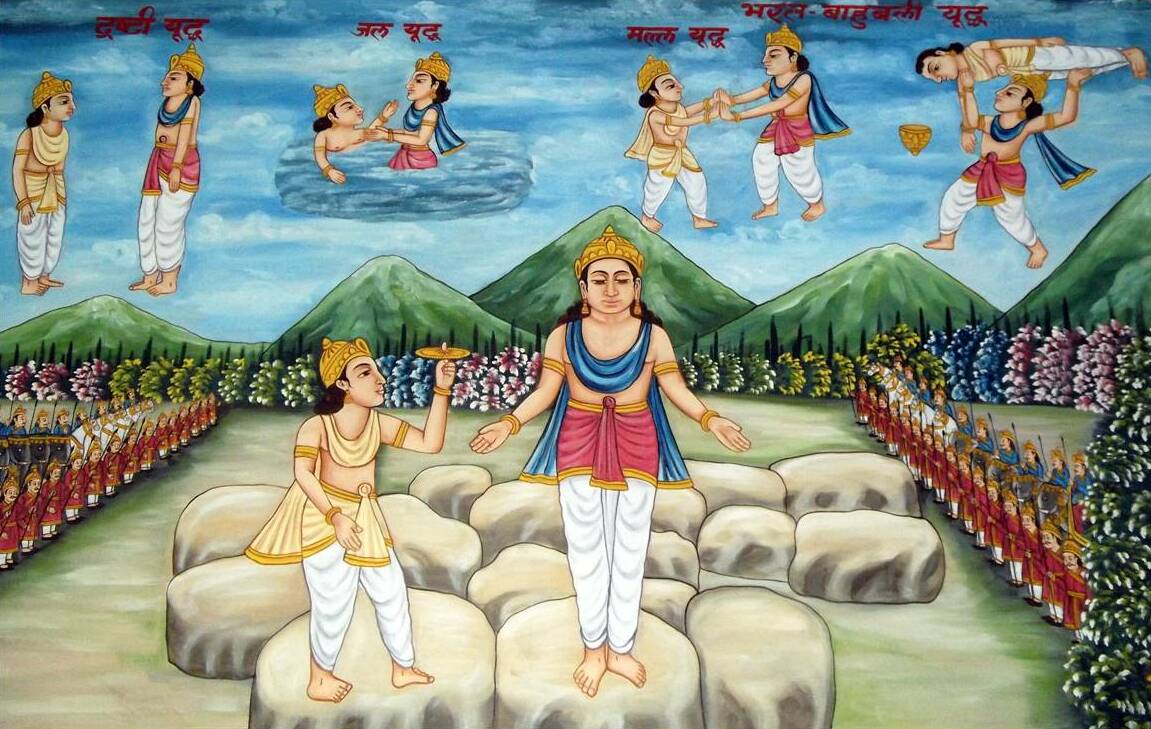
Depiction of Bharata-Bahubali fight

According to Jain texts, Bahubali was born to Rishabhanatha and Sunanda of the Ikshvaku dynasty in Ayodhya. He studied medicine, archery, floriculture and gemology. He had a son named Somakirti, who is referred to as Mahabala. In Jinasena's Adipurana, Bahubali is classified as the first of the 24 Kamadevas of the current half-cycle of time. The text describes his physical attractiveness, noting that women referred to him by epithets such as Manobhava, Manoja, Manmatha, Angaja, and Madana.

Before renouncing worldly life to become a monk, Rishabhanatha distributed his kingdom among his 100 sons. Bharata received the kingdom of Vinita (Ayodhya), while Bahubali received the southern kingdom of Asmaka, with Podanapur as its capital. Following his military conquests (digvijaya) across six regions, Bharata returned to Ayodhya with his army and his chakra-ratna weapon. According to tradition, the weapon stopped at the city's entrance, signaling that his 99 brothers had not yet submitted to his imperial authority. While 98 of his brothers surrendered their kingdoms and became Jain monks, Bahubali refused to submit. Jain texts state that Bahubali possessed a superior physical constitution (vajra-rşabhanārācasamhanana) equal to Bharata's, leading him to challenge his brother's authority.

The ministers on both sides gave the following argument to prevent war; "The brothers themselves, cannot be killed by any means; they are in their last incarnations in transmigration, and possess bodies which no weapon may mortally wound in warfare! Let them fight out the issue by themselves in other ways." It was then decided that to settle the dispute, three kinds of contests between Bharata and Bahubali would be held. These were eye-fight (staring at each other)(drishti-yuddha), water-fight (jala-yuddha), and wrestling (malla-yuddha). Bahubali won all the three contests over his elder brother, Bharata.

The Adipurana further narrates that, after losing the wrestling contest, Bharata became angry and used his divine weapon, the chakra-ratna, against Bahubali. But Bahubali was invincible to it, so the weapon just went around him, lost its power, and stopped near him. Bahubali then thought about how foolish it was to fight with a brother for a perishable kingdom. He scolded Bharata, gave his kingdom to his son Mahabali, and chose to renounce everything by accepting Jain initiation.

=== Renunciation ===
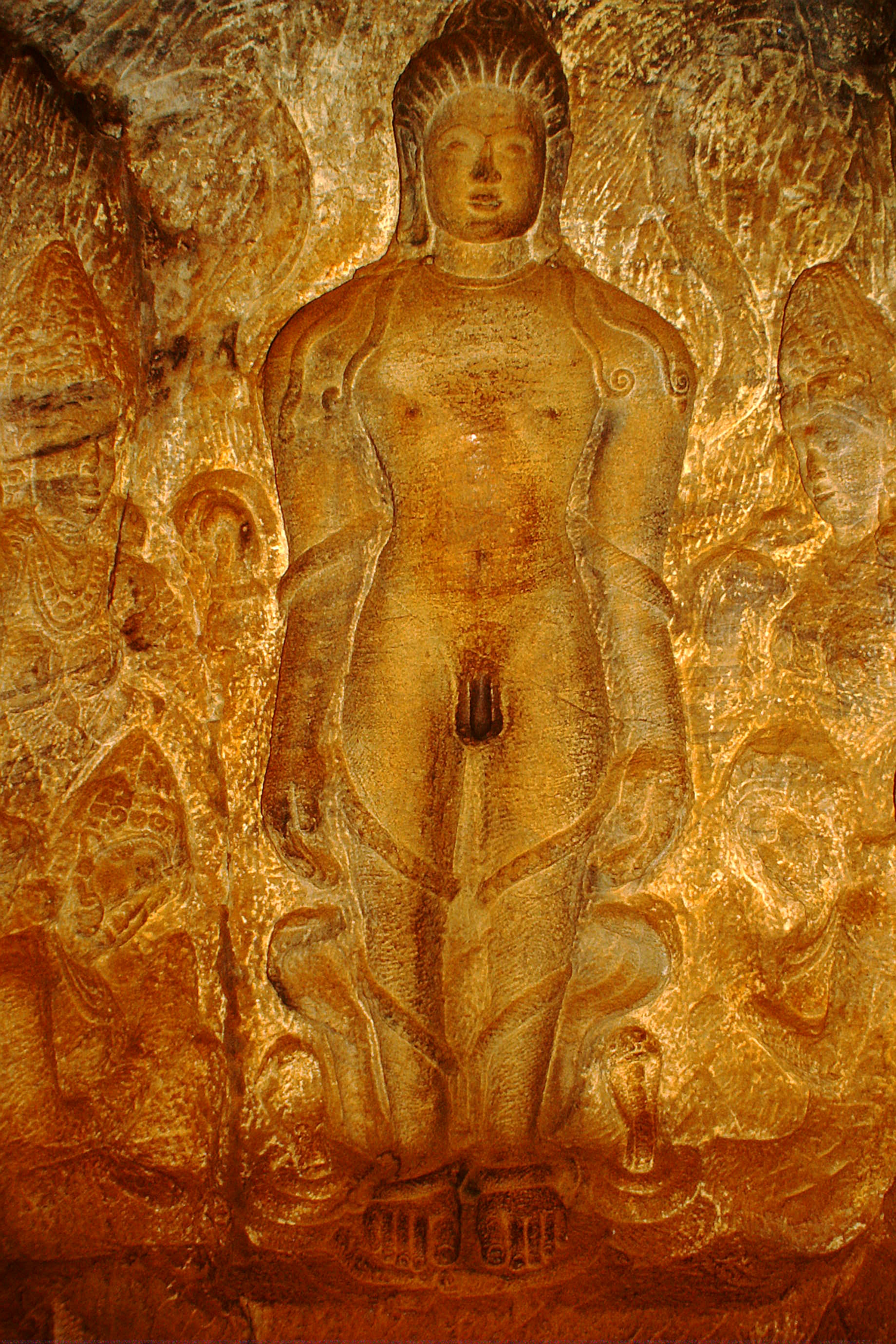
Sculpture depicting Bahubali's meditation in Kayotsarga posture with vines enveloped around his body (Photo: Badami caves)

After the fight, Bahubali was filled with disgust at the world and developed a desire for renunciation. Bahubali abandoned all possessions—kingdom, clothes, ornaments—to become a monk, and began meditating with great resolve to attain omniscience (kevala jnana).

He is said to have meditated motionless in a standing posture (kayotsarga) for a year, during which time climbing plants grew around his legs. However, he was adamant and continued his practice unmindful of the vines, ants, and dust that enveloped his body. According to the Jain text Ādi purāṇa, on the last day of Bahubali's one year long fast, Bharata came in all humility to Bahubali and worshipped him with veneration and respect. A painful regret that he had been the cause of his elder brother's humiliation had been disturbing Bahubali's meditation; this was dispersed when Bharata worshipped him. Bahubali was then able to destroy the four kinds of inimical karmas, including the knowledge obscuring karma, and he attained omniscience (kevala jnana). He was now revered as an omniscient being (Kevali). Bahubali finally attained liberation (moksha) at Mount Kailasha and became a pure, liberated soul (siddha). As per texts, he was one of the first Digambara monks to have attained moksha in the present half-cycle of time.(Avasarpiṇī).

== Early images and museum collections ==
Early depictions of Bahubali occur in South Indian and Deccan Jain art. Cave 4 at Badami includes a 7th–8th-century relief of Bahubali in the kayotsarga posture, identified by the creepers growing around his legs. At Ellora, the Jain caves include 9th-century reliefs of Bahubali; in Cave 32 he is shown with attendants removing vines from his legs, celestial figures above, and deer at his feet.

The Metropolitan Museum of Art in New York holds a Chalukyan-period copper-alloy image of Bahubali from Karnataka, dated to the late 6th–7th century. The museum describes the 11.1 cm icon as the oldest Jain image in its collection and the earliest known representation of Bahubali in Jain art.

A 14th-century basalt figure of Bahubali in the British Museum was exhibited in the United States in The Peaceful Liberators: Jain Art from India at the Los Angeles County Museum of Art, the Kimbell Art Museum, and the New Orleans Museum of Art.

== Statues ==
=== Karnataka ===
There are five monolithic statues of Bahubali measuring more than 6 m (20 feet) in height in Karnataka:

- 17.4 m (57 feet) at Shravanabelagola in Hassan District in 981 CE
- 12.8 m (42 feet) at Karkala in Udupi District in 1430
- 11.9 m (39 feet) at Dharmasthala in Dakshina Kannada District in 1973
- 10.7 m (35 feet) at Venur in Dakshina Kannada District in 1604
- 6 m (17.5 feet) at Gommatagiri in Mysore District in 14th century CE

=== Maharashtra ===
- 8m (28 feet) at Kumbhoj in Kolhapur district in 1963
- 8m (28 feet) at Mumbra in Thane district in 1965

=== Uttar Pradesh ===
- 13.8 metres (45 ft) at Mahavir Jain temple in Firozabad in 1976.
- 7 metres (23 ft) at Bahubaleshwar Temple in Greater Noida

=== Tamil Nadu ===
- 7.3 m (24 feet) at Polur in Tiruvannamalai district in 2023.

=== United States of America ===
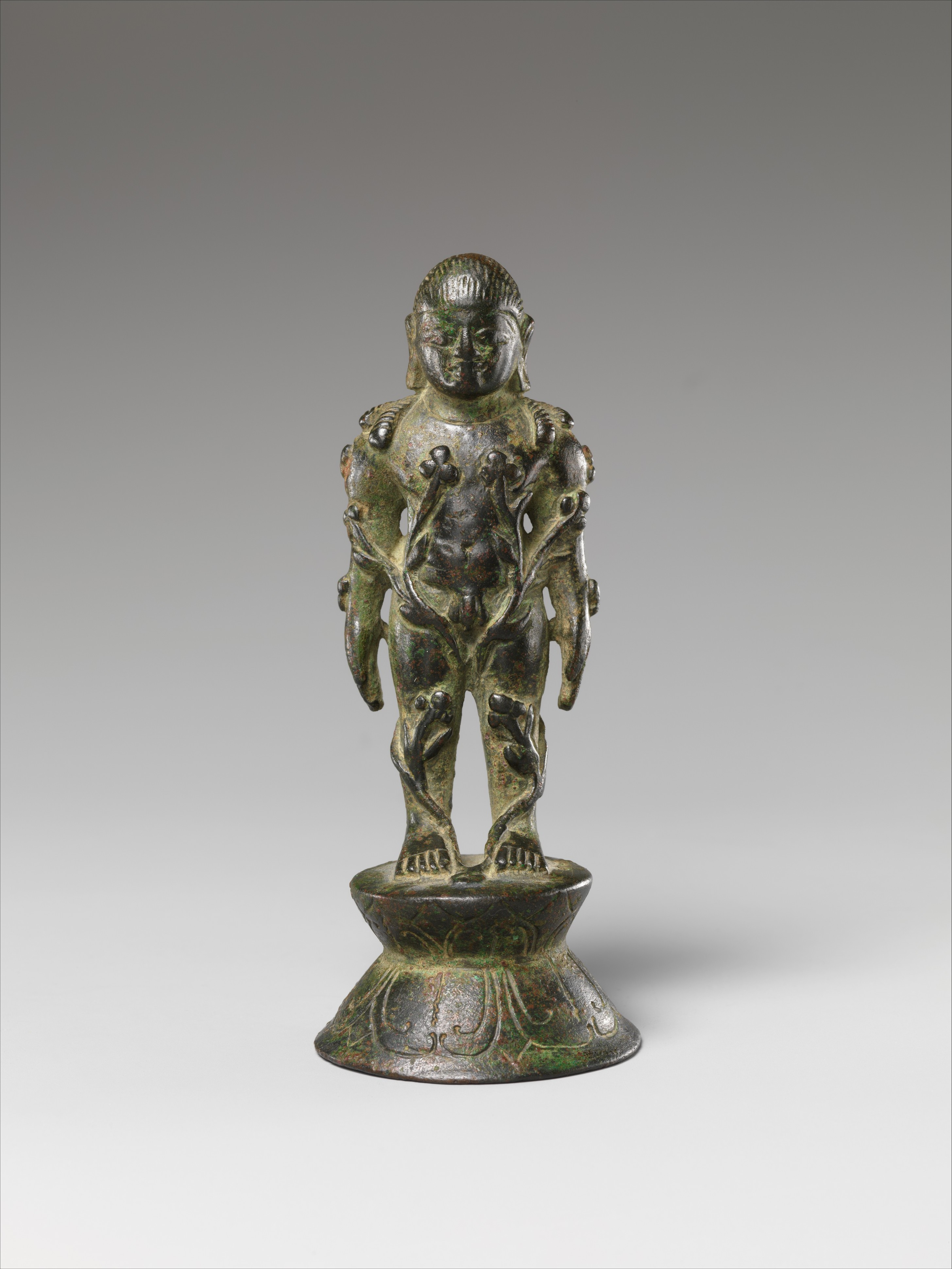
Chalukyan-period copper-alloy image of Bahubali in the Metropolitan Museum of Art, New York.

- The Metropolitan Museum of Art in New York has a Chalukyan-period copper-alloy image titled Jain Siddha Bahubali, Entwined with Forest Vines, from Karnataka and dated to the late 6th–7th century. The museum describes it as the oldest Jain image in its collection and as the earliest known representation of Bahubali in Jain art. The small icon, 11.1 cm (4 3/8 in.) high, depicts Bahubali in the Kayotsarga (body-abandonment posture) with forest vines, a motif connected with his meditation, renunciation, and attainment of moksha.
- In 2016, a separate metal image of Bahubali from Andhra Pradesh was among Indian antiquities retrieved from the United States, according to a Government of India list of repatriated artefacts.

=== Shravanabelagola ===
The monolithic statue of Bahubali at Shravanabelagola, located 158 km (98 miles) from Bangalore, was carved from a single block of granite. The statue was commissioned by the Ganga dynasty minister and commander Chavundaraya; it is 57-foot (17 m) tall and is situated above a hill in Shravanabelagola, in the Hassan district of Karnataka. It was built in and around 981 CE and is one of the largest free-standing statues in the world. The statue is visible from 25 kilometres (16 miles) away. Shravanabelagola has remained a centre of pilgrimage (tirtha) for the Jains. The statue is bathed at an interval of every 12 years and this event is celebrated as Mahamastakabhisheka.

=== Karkala ===
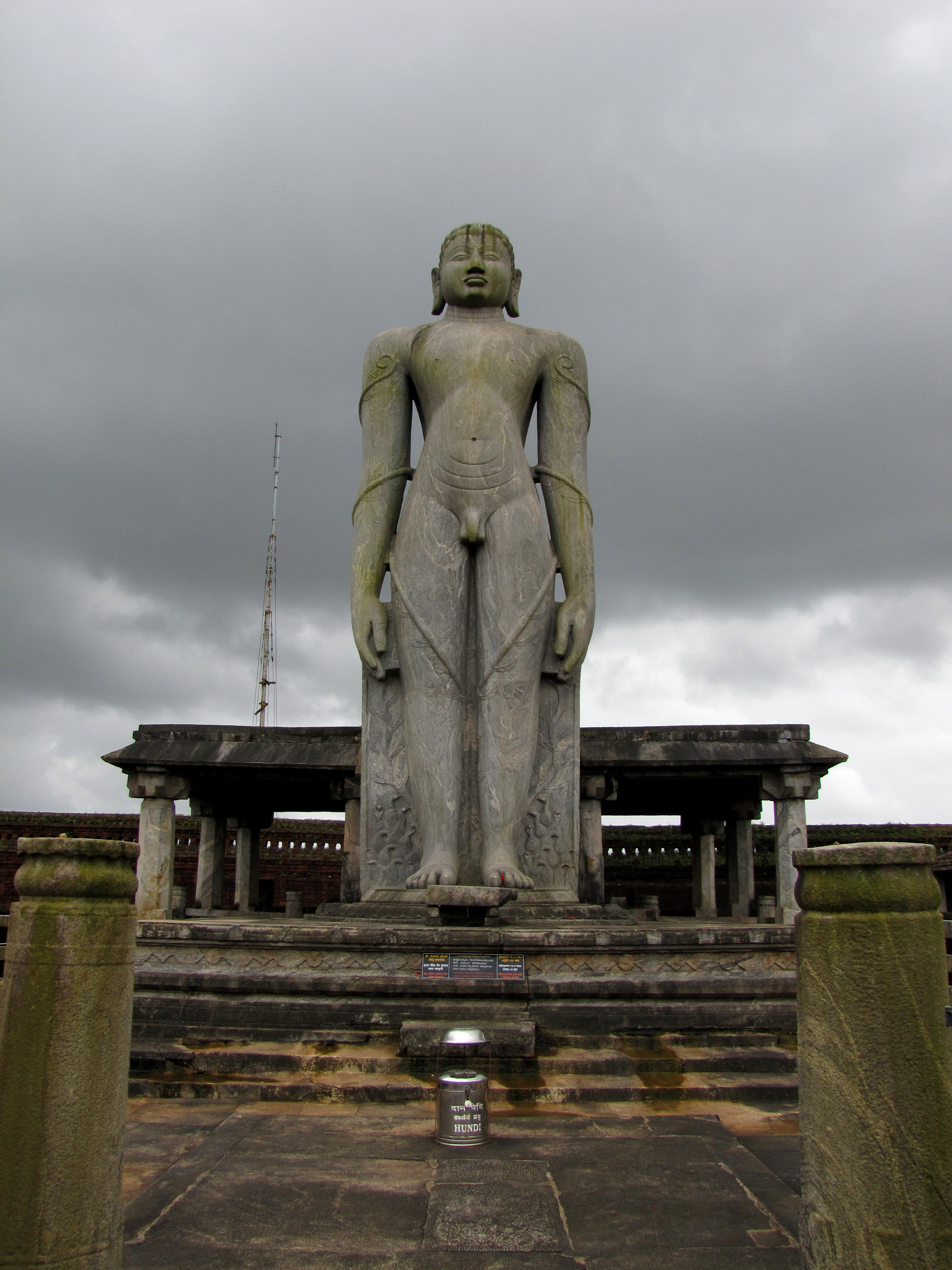
Bahubali monolith of Karkala

Karkala is known for its 42 ft (13 m) monolithic statue of Gomateshwara Bahubali, which is believed to have been built around 1432 and is the second-tallest statue in the State. The statue is built on an elevated platform on top of a rocky hill. It was consecrated on 13 February 1432 by Veera Pandya Bhair Arasa Wodeyar, scion of the Bhair Arasa dynasty, feudatory of the Vijayanagar Ruler.

=== Dharmastala ===
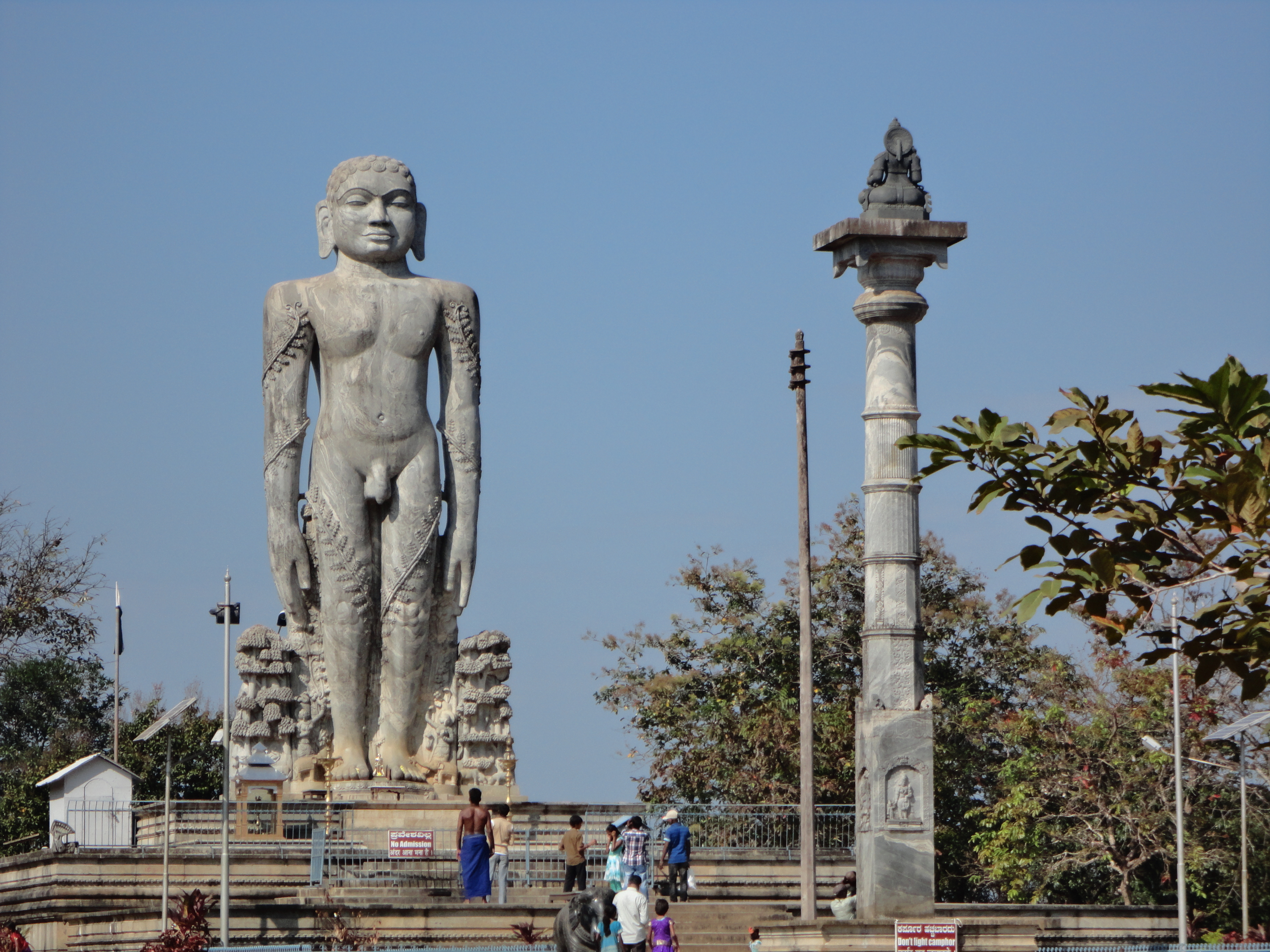
Bahubali monolith of Dharmastala

A 39-foot (12 m) high statue with a 13-foot (4.0 m) pedestal that weighs about 175 t (175,000 kg) is installed at Dharmasthala in Karnataka.

=== Venur ===
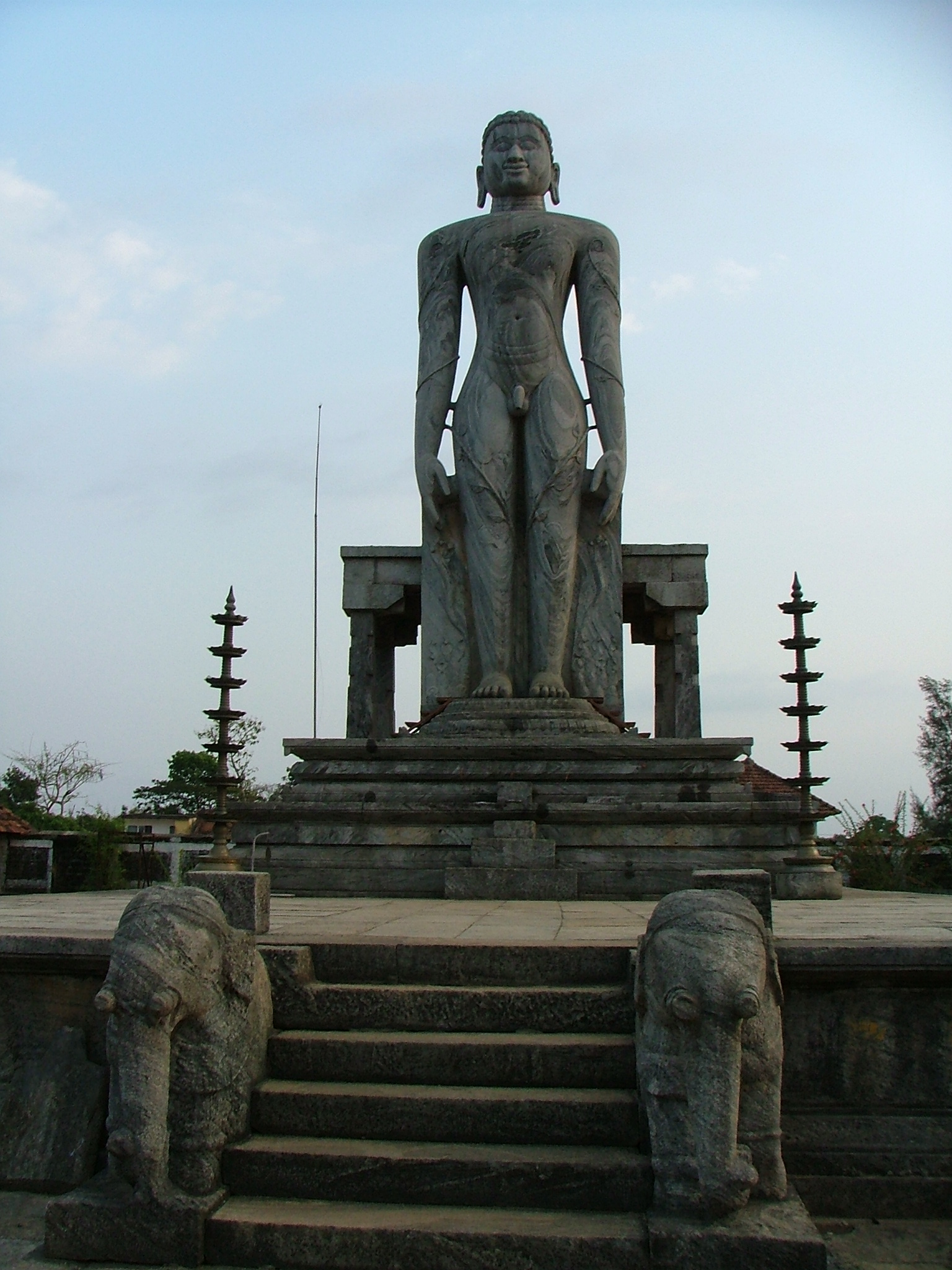
Bahubali monolith of Venur

Venur is a small town in Dakshina Kannada district, Karnataka state, situated on the bank of the Gurupura River. Thimmanna Ajila built a 38-foot (12 m) colossus of Gommateshwara there in 1604. The statue at Venur is the shortest of the three Gommateshwaras within 250 km (160 miles) around it. It stands in an enclosure on the same pattern as that of the statue at Shravanabelagola. The Kings of Ajila Dynasty ruled here from 1154 to 1786.

=== Gommatagiri ===
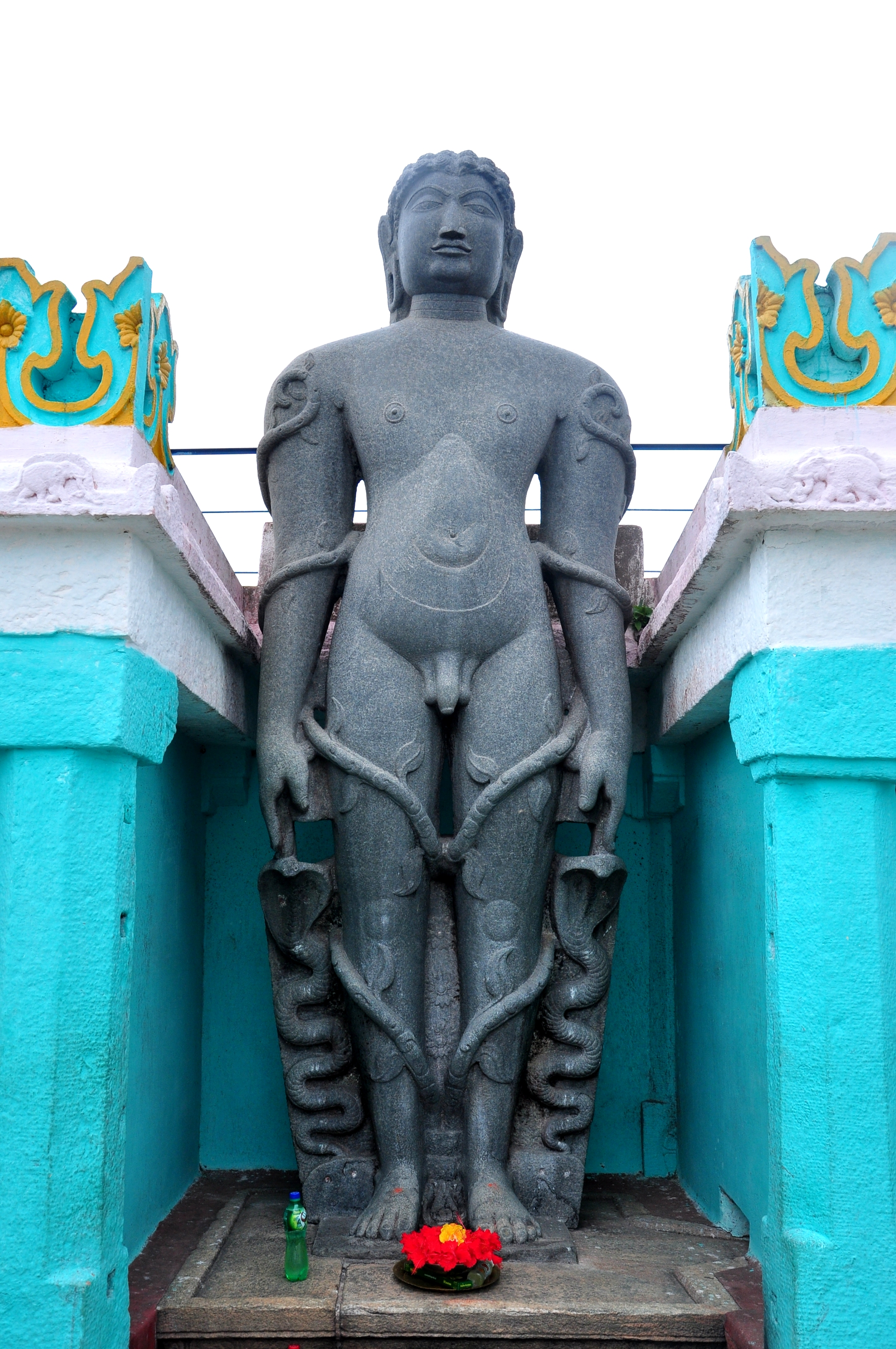
Bahubali monolith of Gommatagiri, Mysore

Gommatagiri is an acclaimed Jain centre. The 12th-century granite statue of Bahubali, also known as Gomateshwara, is erected atop a 50-metre (160 ft) tall hillock called 'Shravana Gudda'. The Jain centre attracts many pilgrims during the annual Mahamastakabhisheka in September. The statue at Gommatagiri is very similar to the 58-foot (18 m) Gommateshwara statue in Shravanabelagola, except that it is smaller. Historians attribute the statue to an early Vijayanagar period.

=== Kumbhoj ===
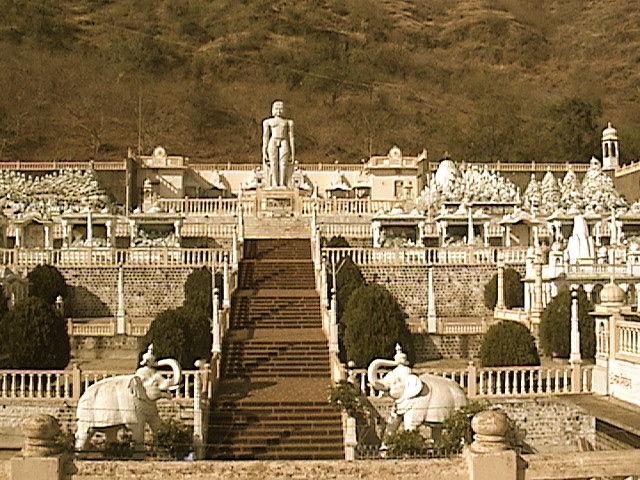
28-foot (8.5 m)-high monolith of Bahubali at Kumbhoj

Kumbhoj is the name of an ancient town located in Kolhapur district, Maharashtra. The town is about eight kilometers from Hatkanangale, about twenty seven kilometers from Kolhapur. The famous Jain pilgrimage centre where a 28-foot (8.5 m)-high statue of Bahubali is installed is 2 kilometres (1.2 mi) from the Kumbhoj city.

=== Aretipur ===
There is a 10-foot (3.0 m)-high statue of Bahubali at Aretipur, Near Kokrebellur Village of Madur Taluk Mandya district.

In 2016, the Archaeological Survey of India (ASI) excavated another 13 ft (4.0 m)-high statue of Bahubali made in the 3rd – 9th centuries in Aretipur. ASI has also excavated an 8th-century statue of Bahubali in Aretipur, Maddur, Mandya, Karnataka, that is 3 feet (0.91 m) wide and 3.5 ft (1.1 m) tall.

=== Greater Noida ===
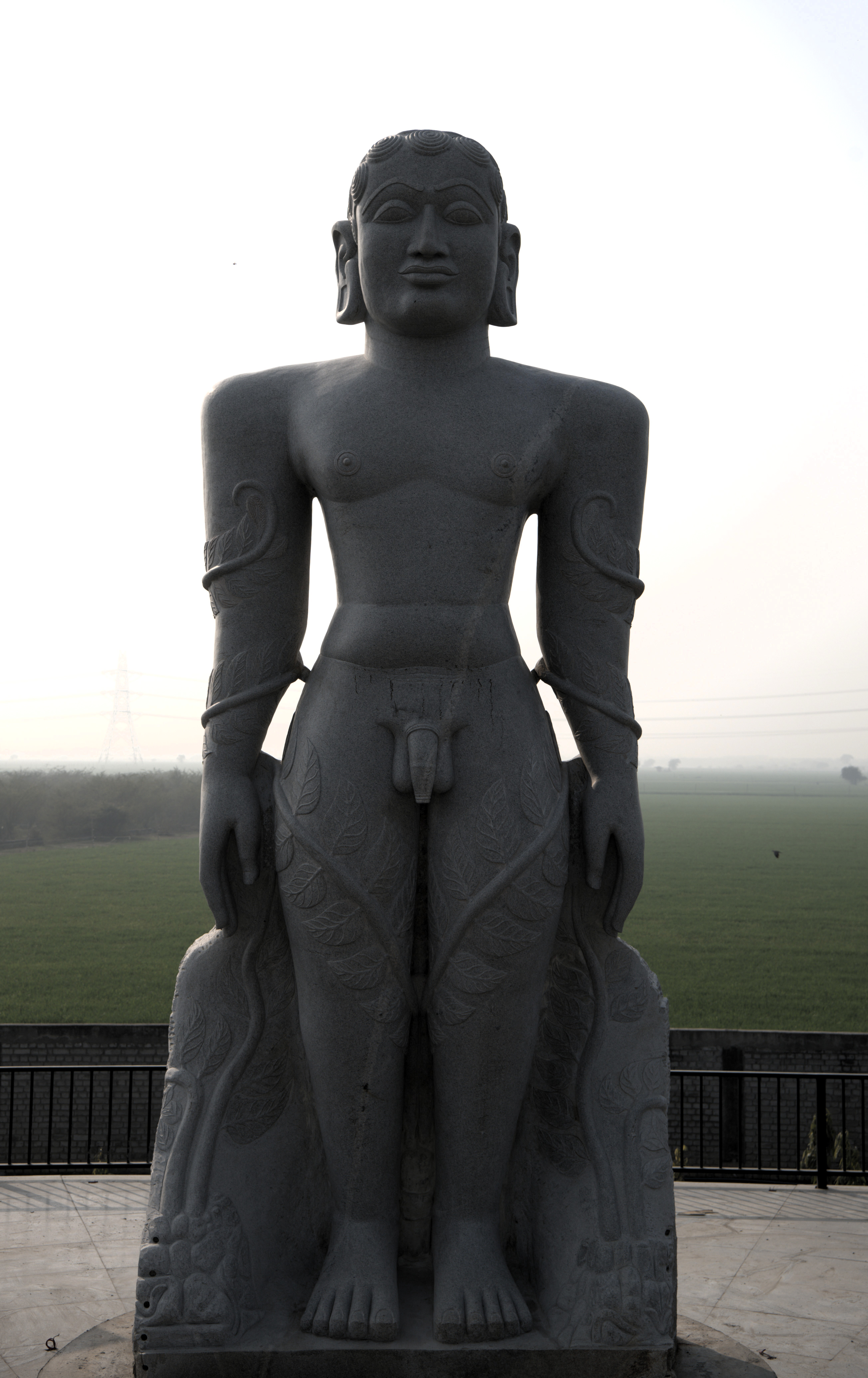
Bahubaleshwar

The Bahubaleshwar Temple in village Gharbhara has a 23 ft (7.0 m) high Statue of Bahubali in granite.

Built with sustainability in mind, the temple boasts a Miyawaki forest with 5,000 trees, a pond, fountains, mud cottages, and 90% green coverage.

== In literature ==
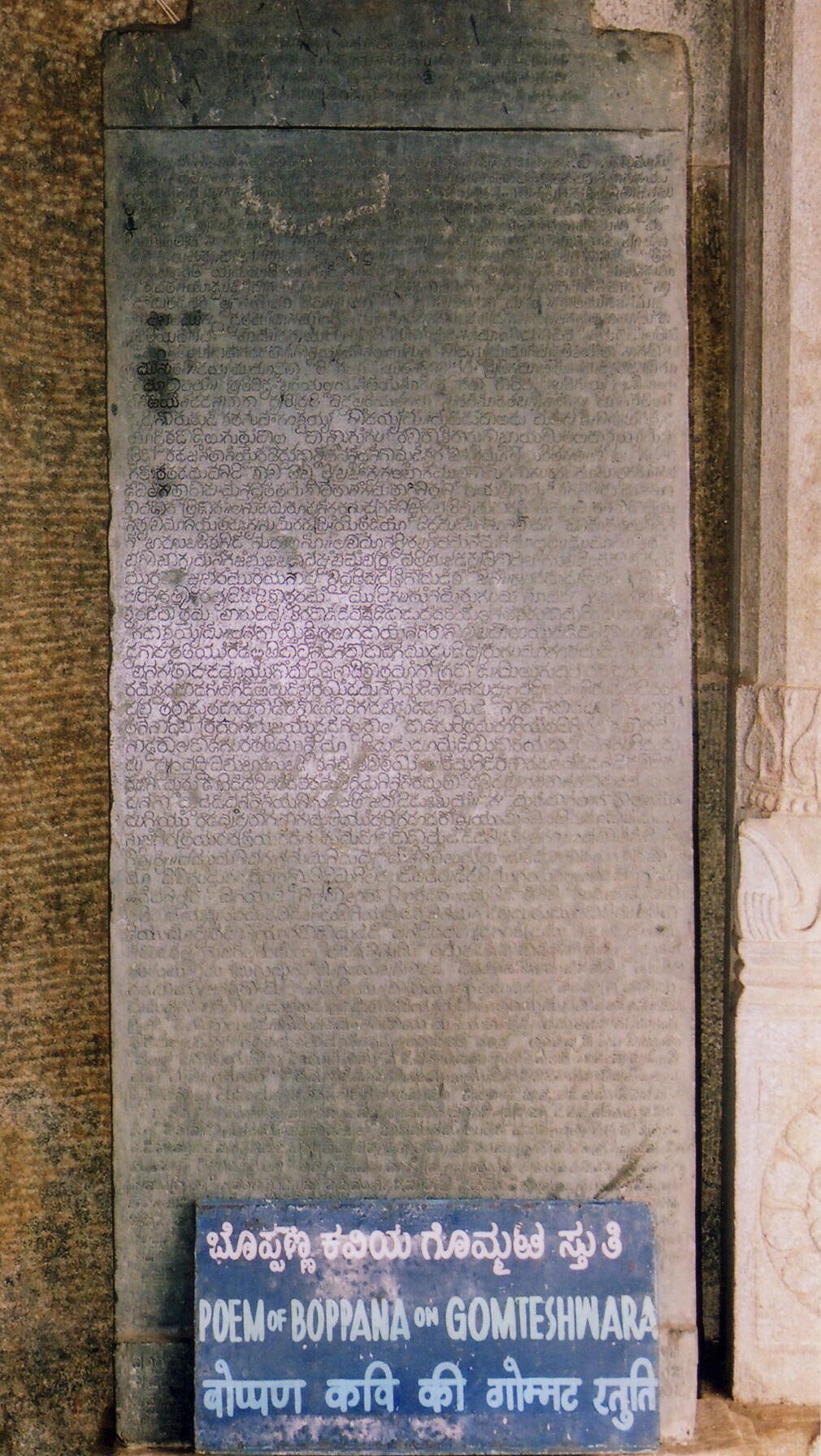
Poem by Boppanna

The life-story of Bahubali has been discussed in many works.

=== Sanskrit ===
- The Ādi purāṇa composed by Āchārya Jinasena. The Gommateshvara statue built by Chavundaraya was influenced by description in this book.
- Bahubali charitra written in the 9th century CE

=== Prakrit ===
- Gommatesha-thudi, a religious hymn in praise to Bahubali, was composed by Nemichandra in 10th century CE.
- Gommatasa-sara, composed by Nemichandra, mentions the story of construction of the Gommateshwara statue by Chavundaraya.

=== Kannada ===
- A 10th-century Kannada text based on the Sanskrit text was written by the poet Adikavi Pampa.
- Gommata-stuti is a poem dated 1180 was composed by a Jain poet named Boppanna (also known as Sujanottamsa), in praise of Bahubali.
- Karkala Gommatesvara Charitre, composed by Chadura Chandrama in 1686 CE, is poem describing the mahamastakabhisheka at Karkala.

=== Rajasthani ===
- Bharateshwara Bahubali Ghora composed by Vajrasena Suri in 1168, is a poem with 48 verses describing the battle between Bharata and Bahubali.

=== Gujarati ===
- Bharateshwara Bahubaliras composed by Shalibhadra Suri in 1184, is a poem with 203 stanzas describing the struggle of power between Bharata and Bahubali.

== Images ==
Pictured below are some of the images depicting Bahubali that are located at various places in India.

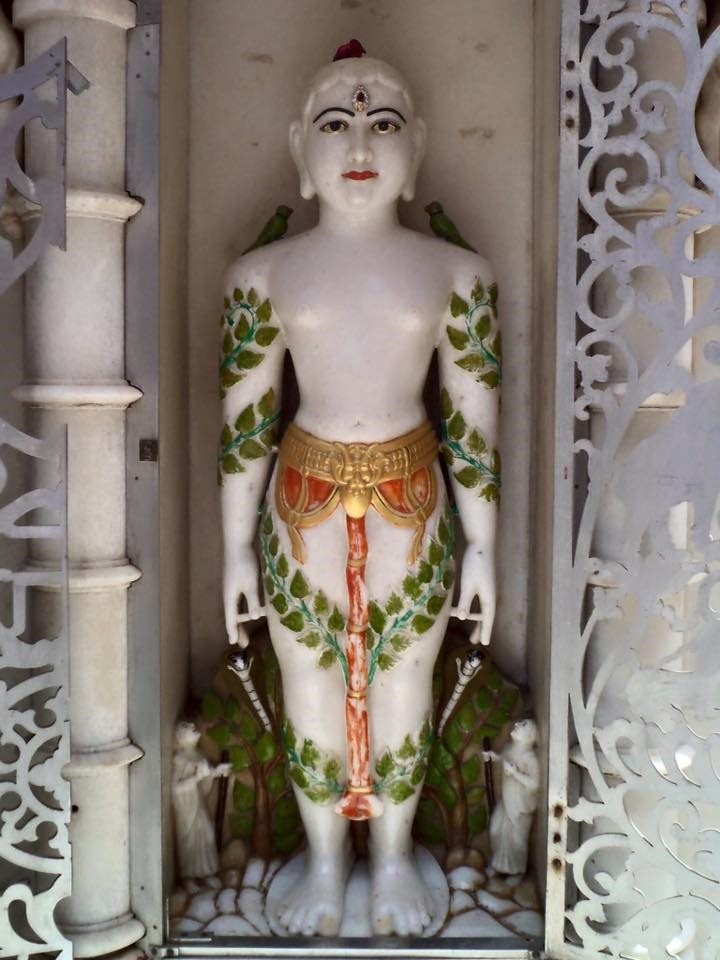
Bahubali at Shree Pragat Prabhavi Parshwanatha Temple, Dabhoi

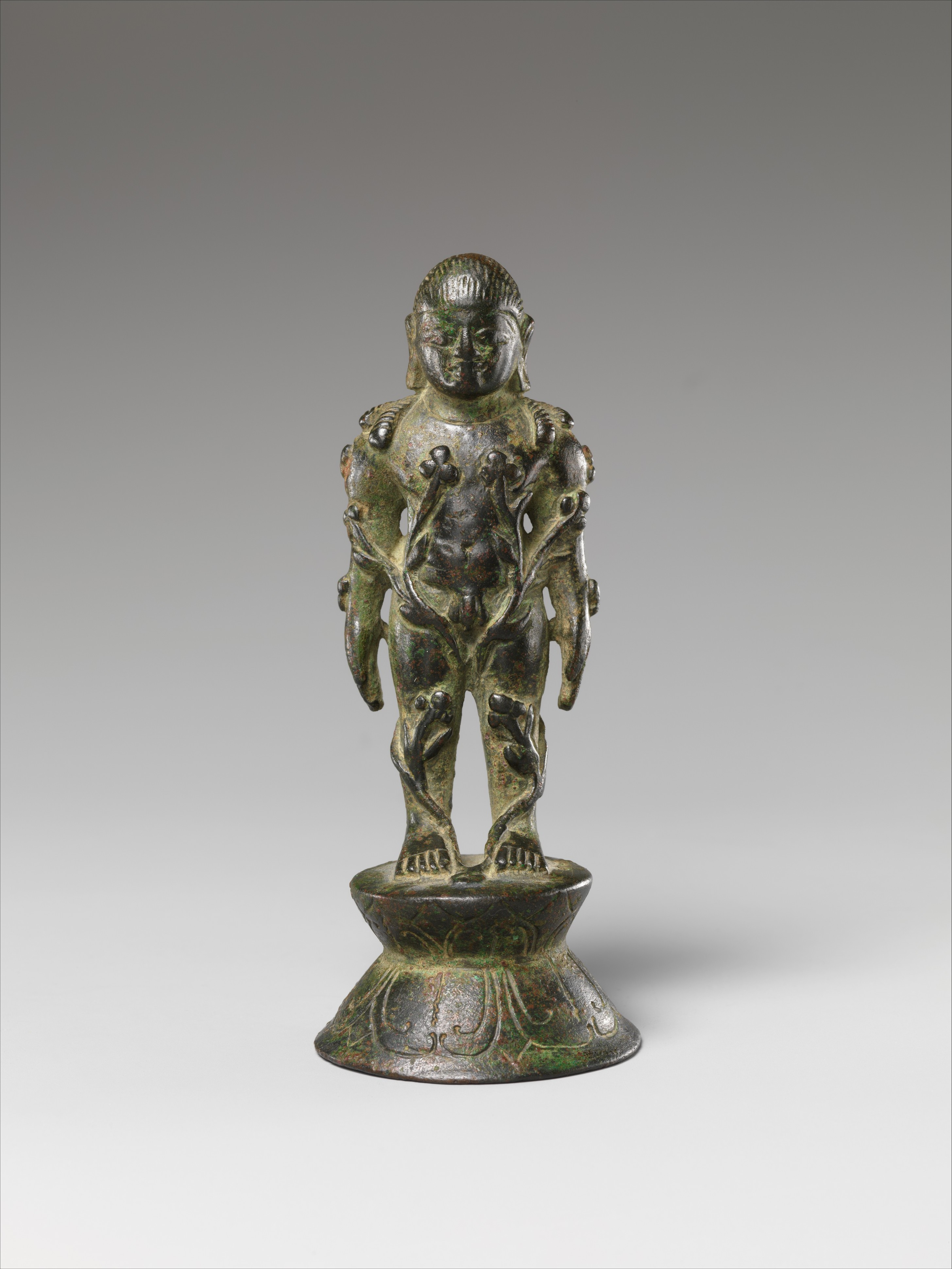
Bahubali, Metropolitan Museum of Art (6th CE)

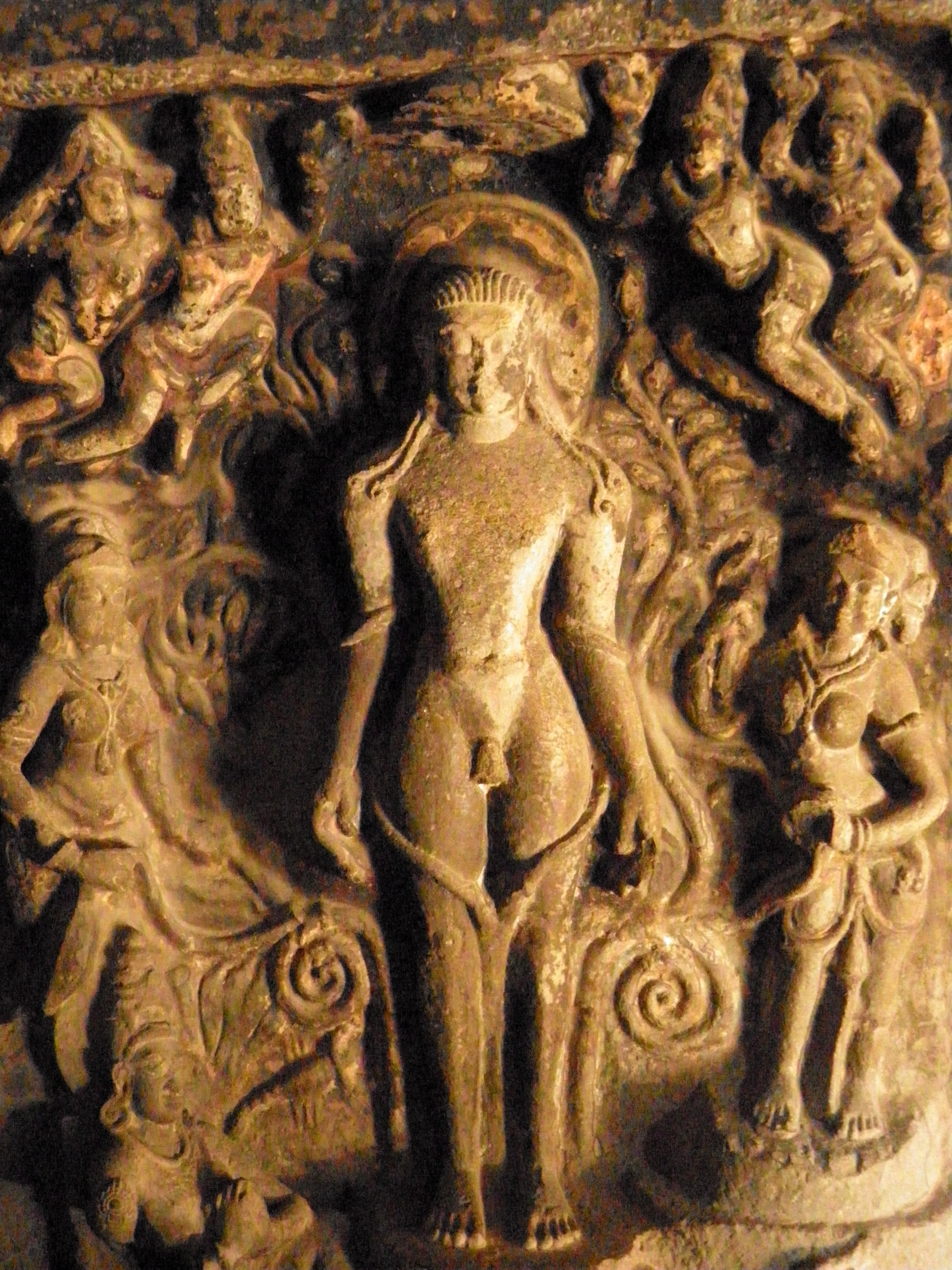
Indra Sabha, Ellora Caves (9th CE)

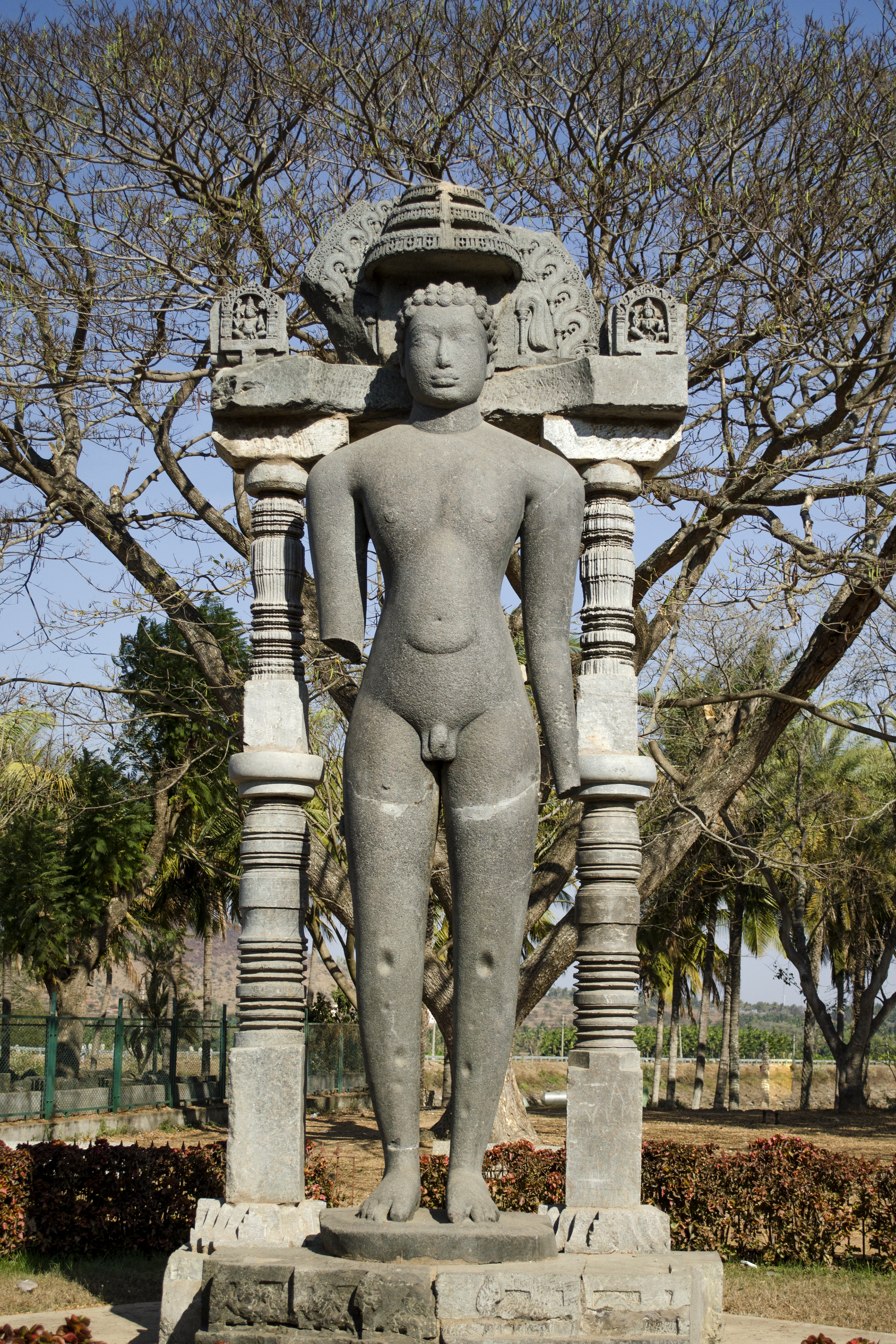
Bahubali monolith at Halebidu (12th CE)

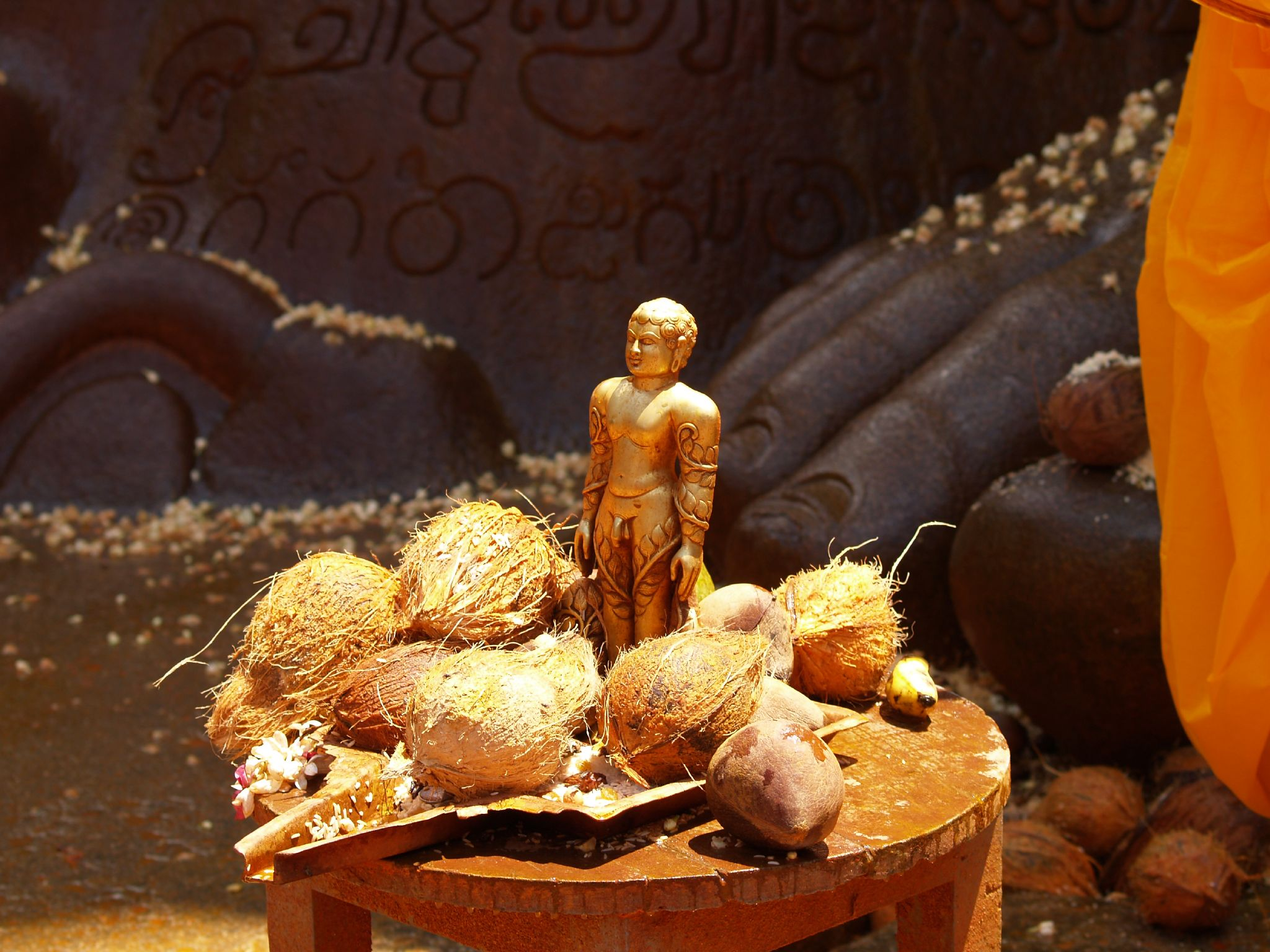
Miniature version of the Gommateshwara statue at Shravanabelagola

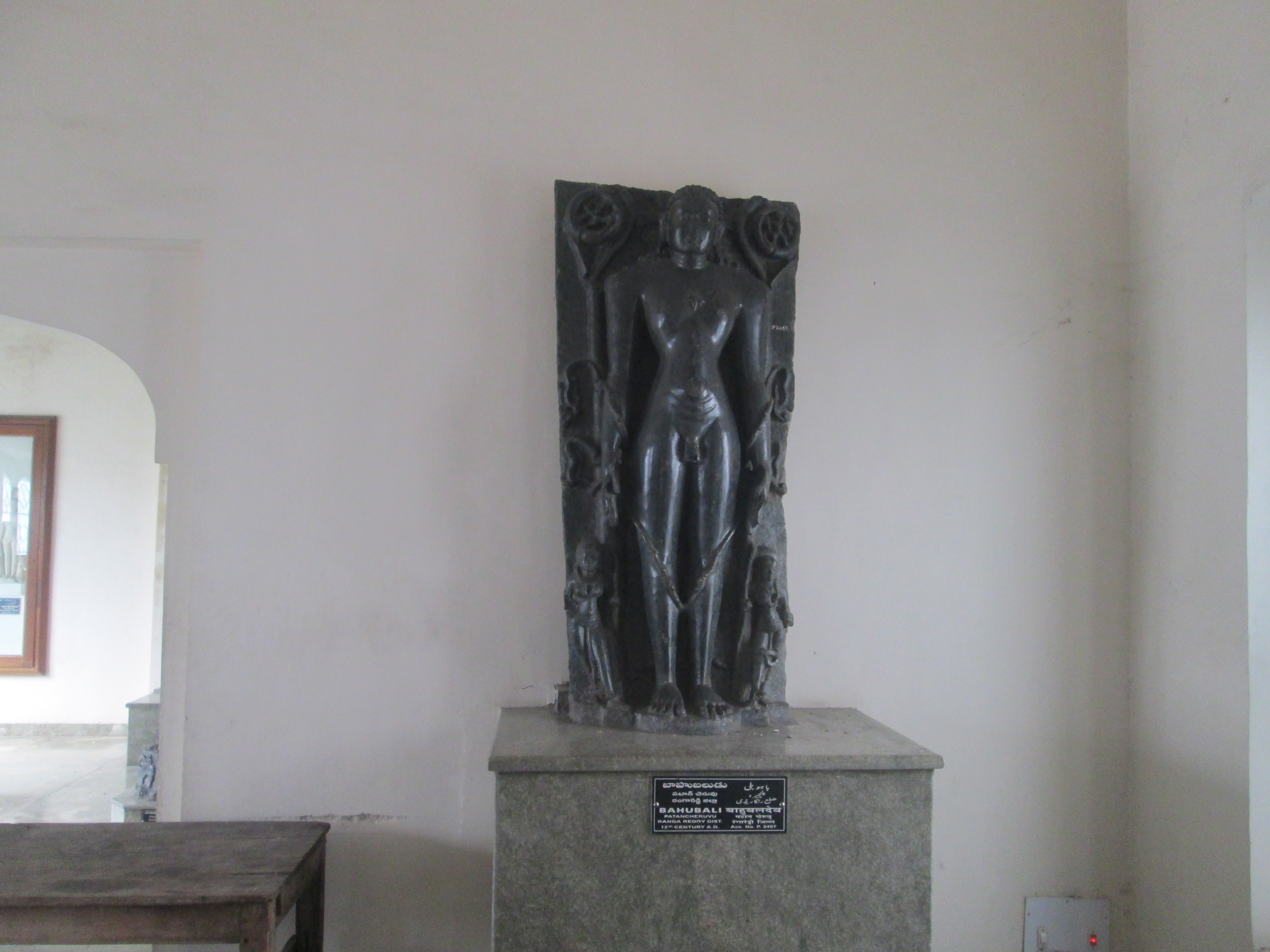
Bahubali statue at YSR state Archaeology Museum, Hyderabad, 12th century

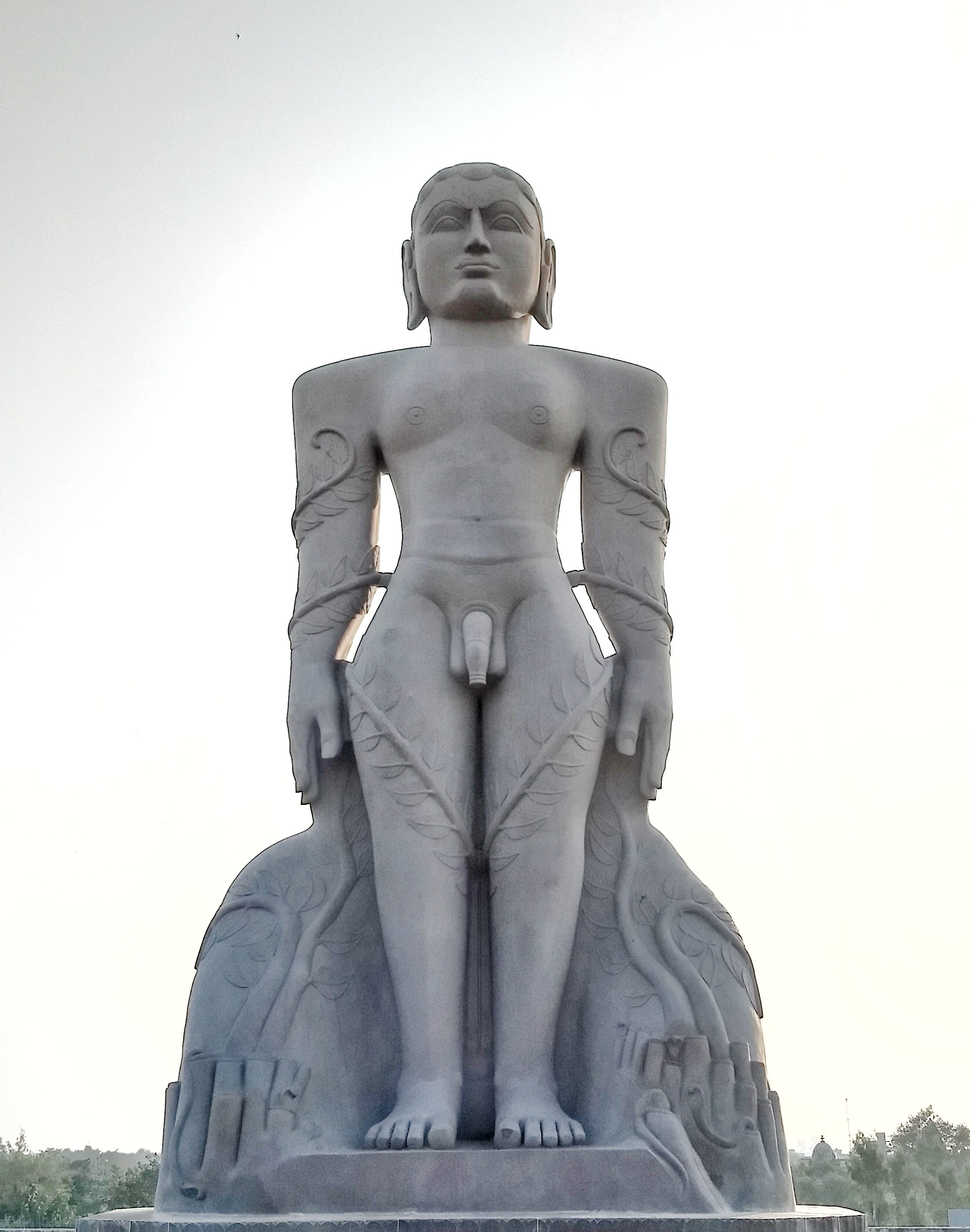
31-foot (9.4 m) statue of Bahubali at Bada Gaon

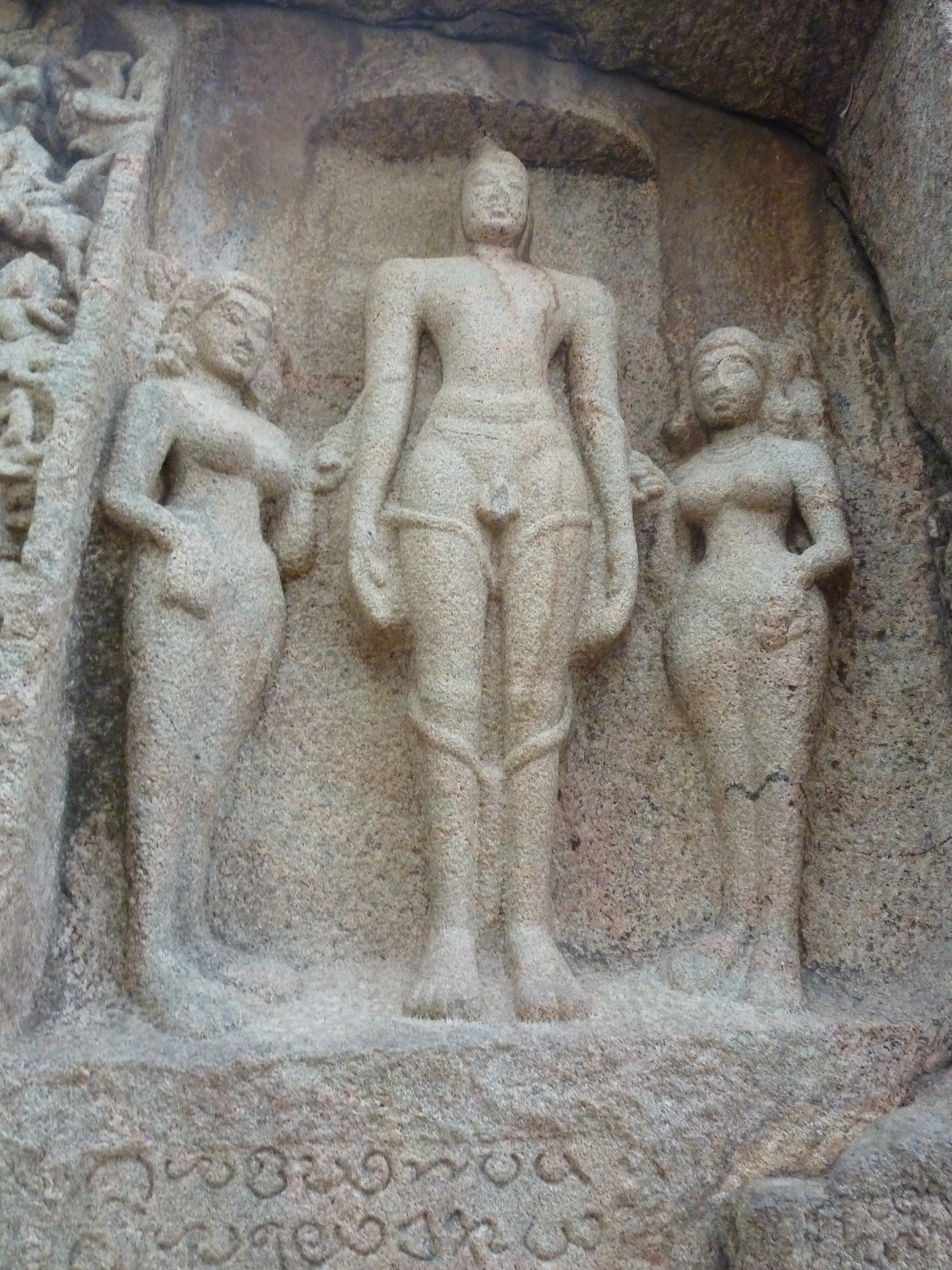
Gomateshwara at Kalugumalai Jain Beds, 8th century

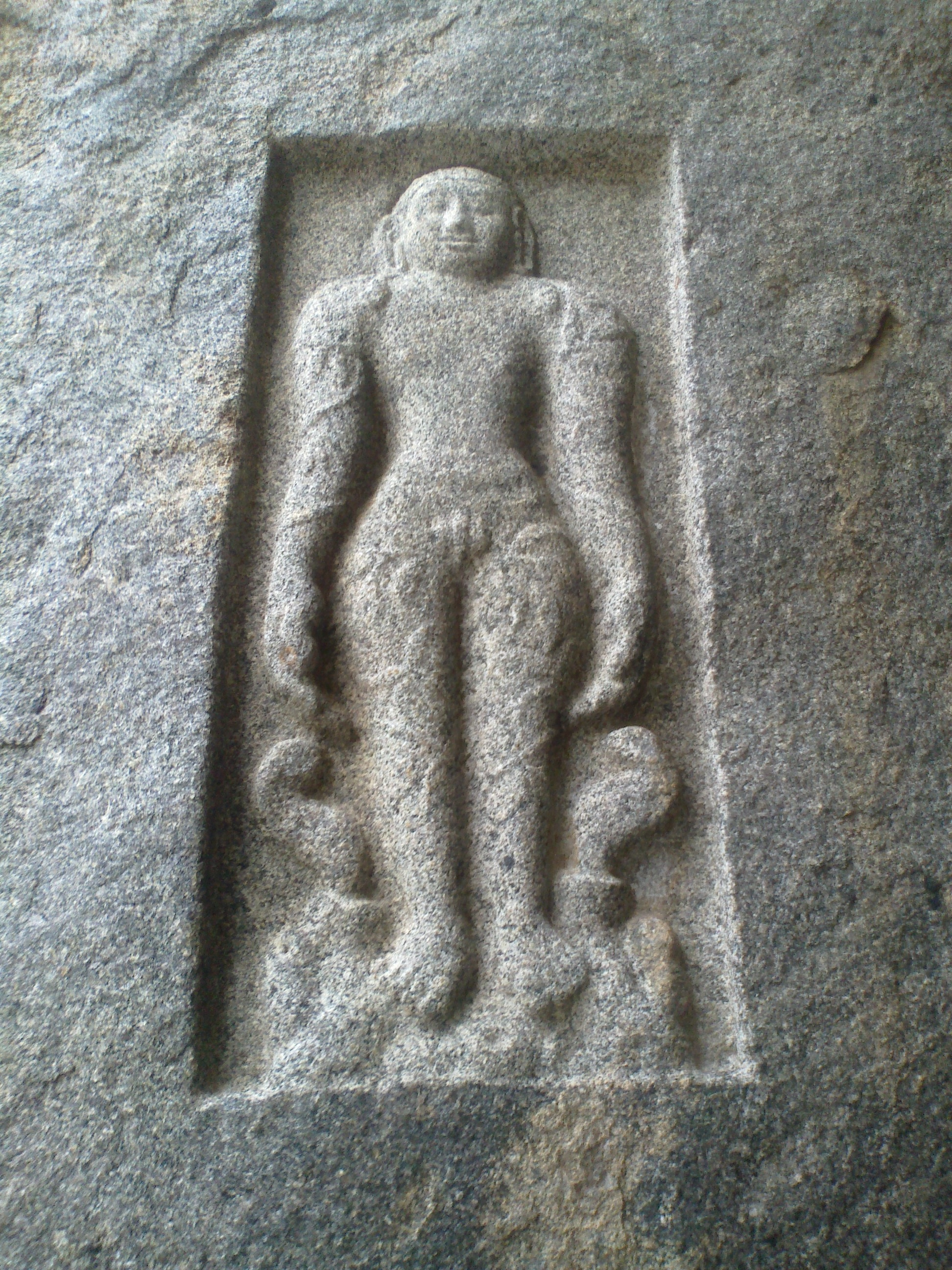
Bahubali at Andimalai Caves, 10th century

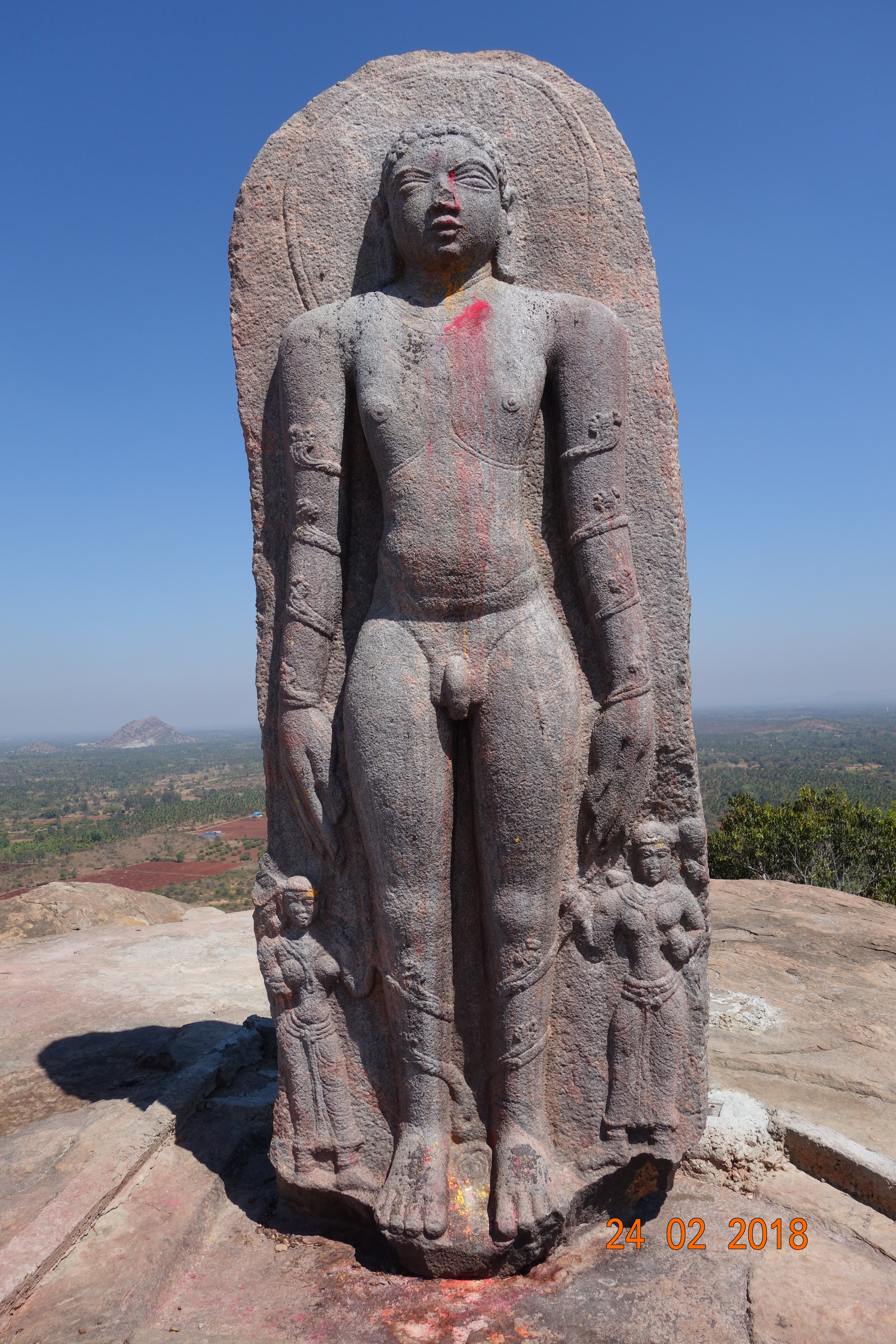
Bahubali at Aretipur

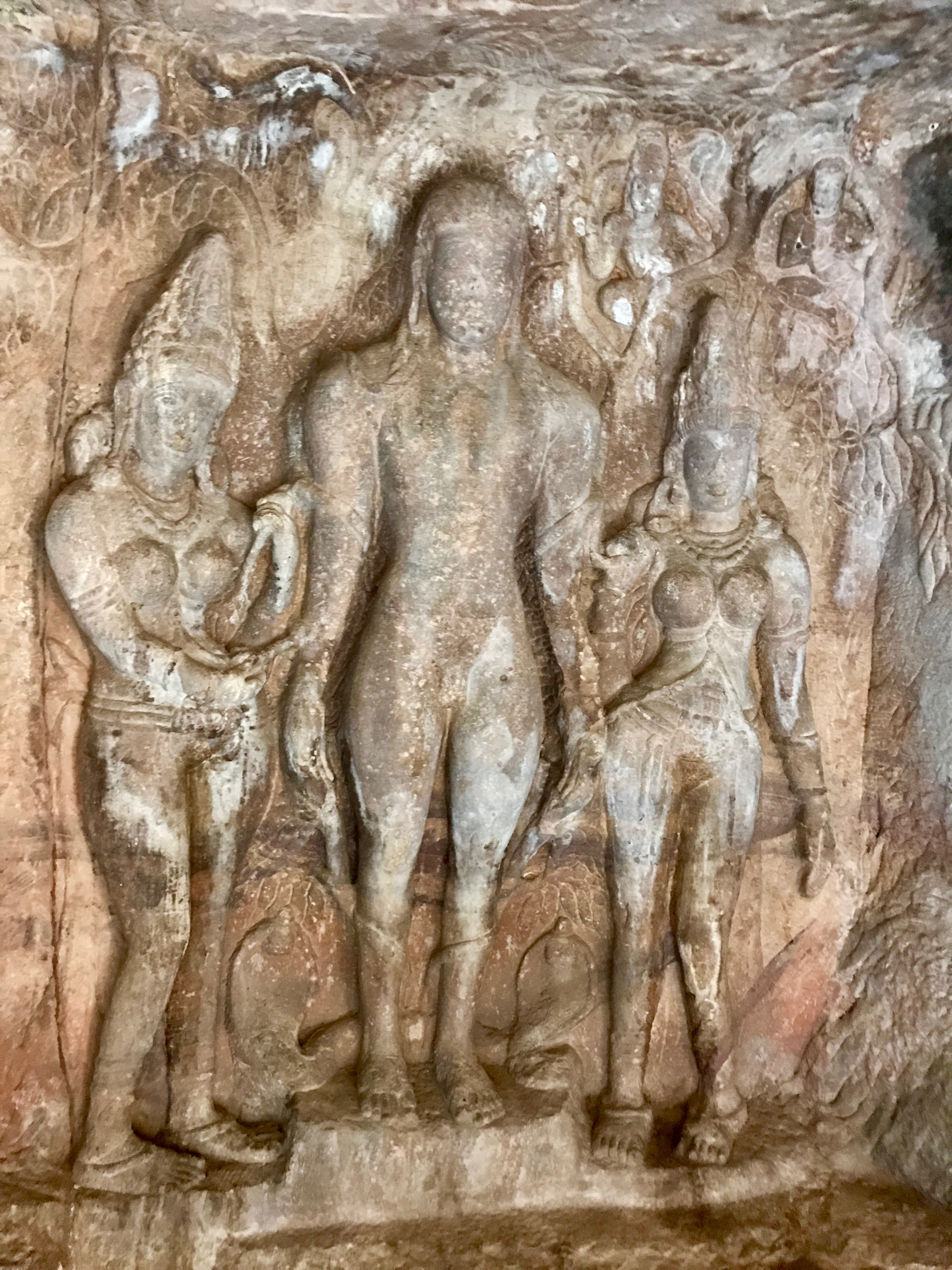
Bahubali at Aihole Jain cave

== See also ==
- God in Jainism
- Jain cosmology
- Jainism in Karnataka
- Statue of Ahimsa
- Bawangaja
