= K. S. Rao =

K. S. Rao may refer to:

- Kakarla Subba Rao, Indian radiologist
- Karnad Sadashiva Rao, Indian freedom fighter
  - K S Rao Road, Mangalore, Karnataka, India
- Katta Subba Rao, Indian film director
- Kavuri Samba Siva Rao, Indian politician, engineer and industrialist
- Kitty Shiva Rao, Montessori teacher and later member of the All India Women's Conference
- Koka Subba Rao, former chief justice of India
