= Kudroli Bhagavathi Temple =

Coordinates: 12.8757°N 74.8378°E

Kudroli Shri Bhagavathi Kshetra ಕುದ್ರೋಳಿ ಶ್ರೀ ಭಗವತೀ ಕ್ಷೇತ್ರ
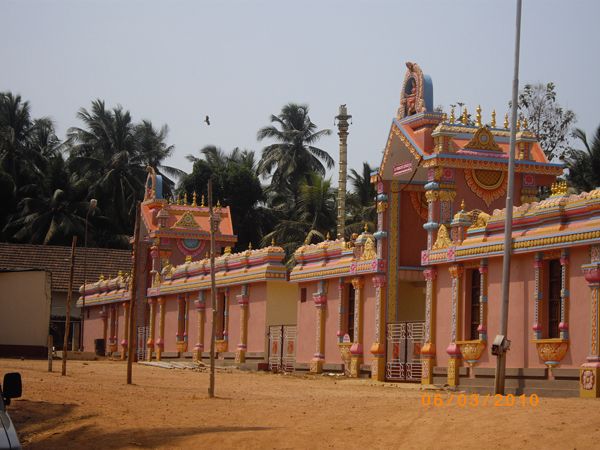
- Kudroli Shri Bhagavathi Kshetra ಕುದ್ರೋಳಿ ಶ್ರೀ ಭಗವತೀ ಕ್ಷೇತ್ರ

Religion
- Affiliation: Hinduism

Location
- Location: Kudroli, Kodailbail, Mangalore, Karnataka
- Interactive map of Kudroli Shri Bhagavathi Kshetra ಕುದ್ರೋಳಿ ಶ್ರೀ ಭಗವತೀ ಕ್ಷೇತ್ರ

Website
- http://kudrolibhagavathi.org

The Kudroli Shri Bhagavathi Kshetra is a temple located in the heart of the city in Kodialbail, Mangalore in Karnataka.

This temple has an 800-year-old history and this is the only temple where 14 Goddesses Bhagavathi are worshiped in three different names: Shri Cheerumbha Bhagavathi (4 forms), Shri Padangara Bhagavathi (5 forms), Shri Pullurali Bhagavathi (5 forms) which is why this temple is called Koota Kala among the 18 bhagavathi temples situated in the States of Karnataka and Kerala states together.

== Festivals ==
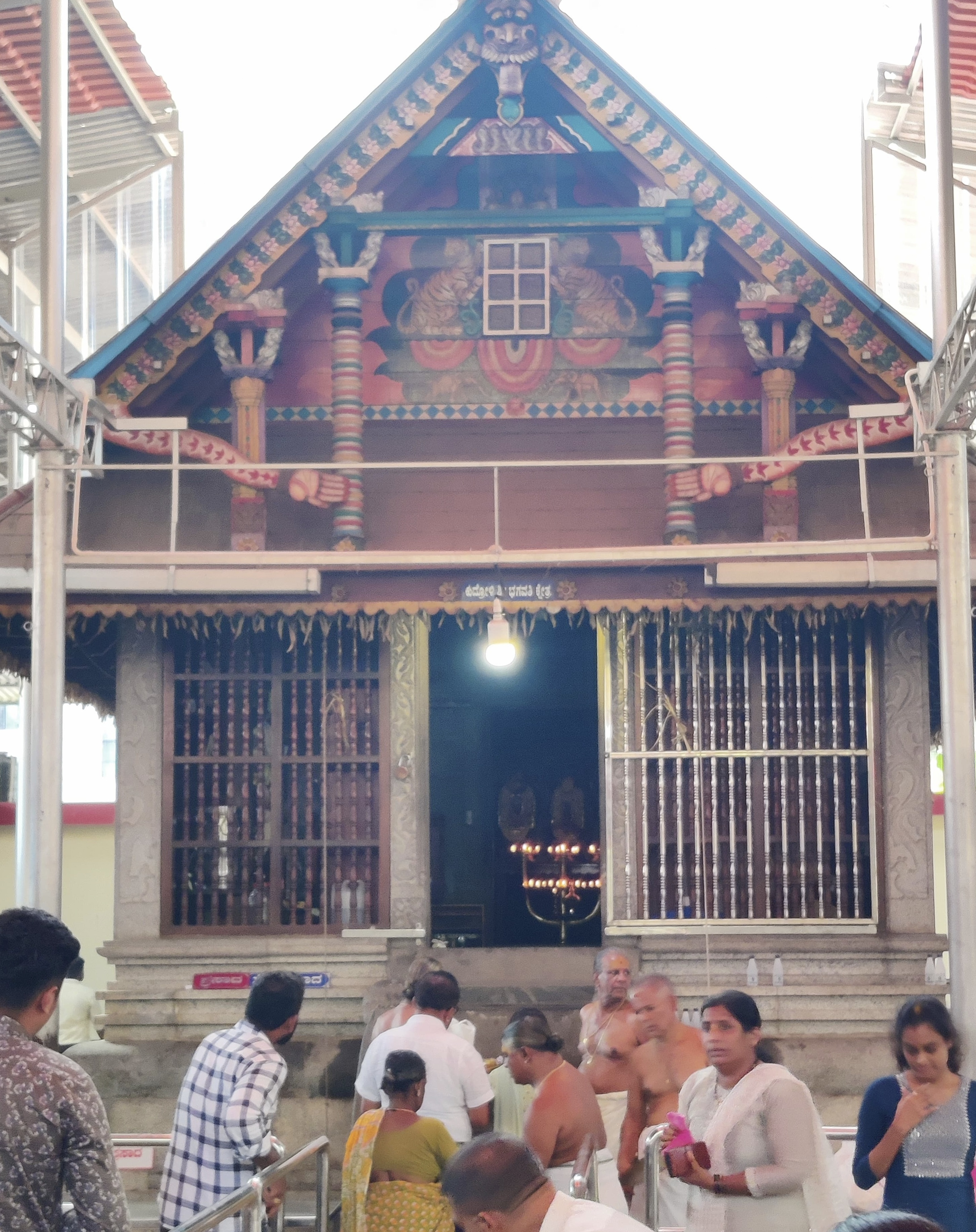
Devotees inside temple

Every year in March, Nadavali Utsav (or Nadavali) is held in the temple for three days, and Bharani Utsav is held grandly once in seven years here.

== Sculptures and spaces ==
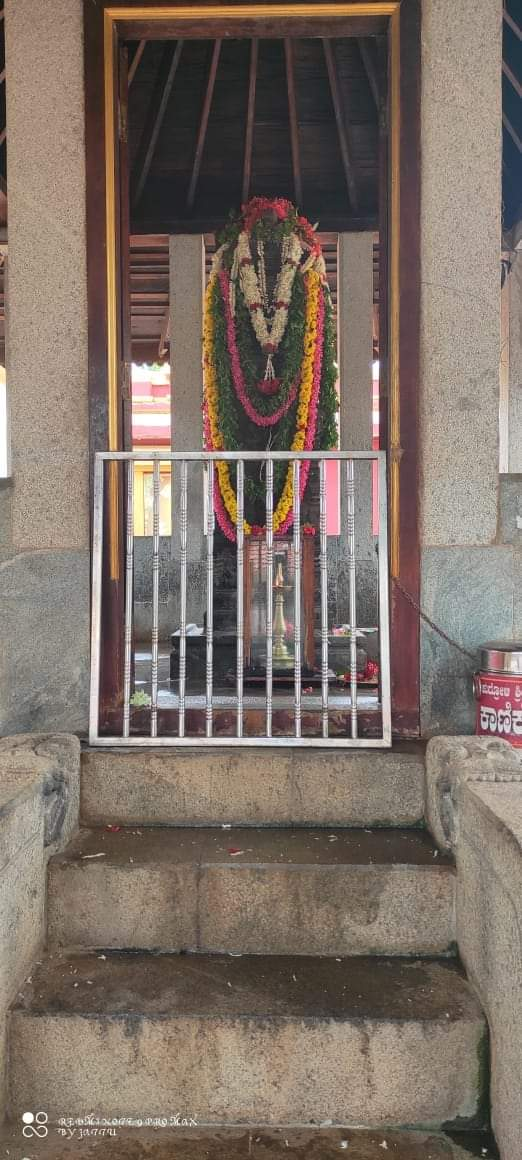
Veera Sthambha at the temple

Veera Sthambha is a stone sculpture and is a special attraction of the temple. Siyala Abisheka is held in the month of May (2nd Sunday) every year.

A statue of Shri Narayana Guru is carved in white marble and situated in the entrance. In the month of September, Narayan Guru Jayanthi is held here.

An auditorium and dining room with a seating capacity of 1,500 people is located within the temple premises.
