= City Centre, Mangaluru =

City Centre
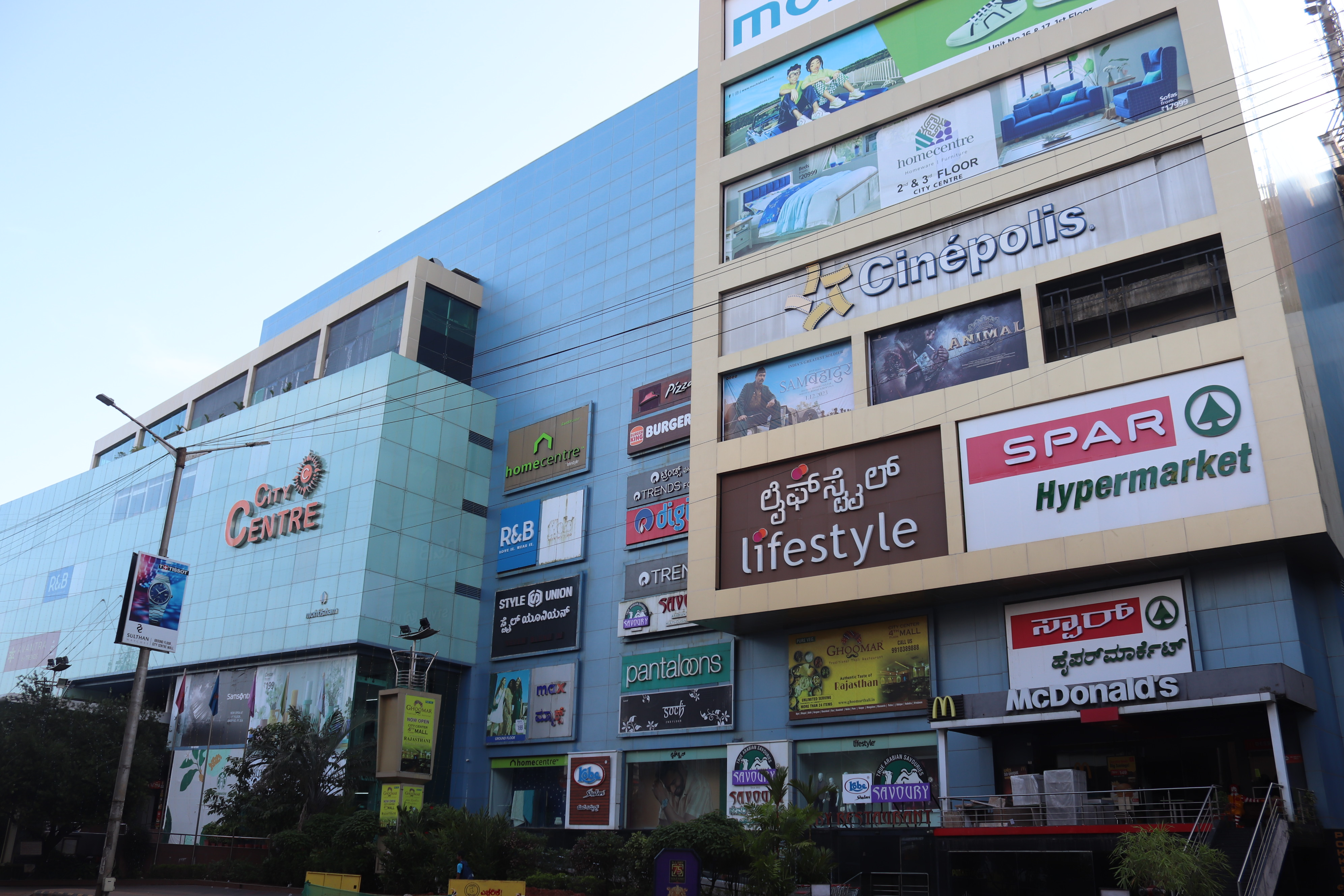
- Location: Mangaluru, Karnataka, India
- Coordinates: 12.871421°N 74.842504°E
- Address: K S Rao Road
- Opened: 25 April 2010
- Developer: Mohtisham Complexes
- Num. of stores: 170
- Num. of anchor tenants: 12
- Floor area: 540,000 sq ft (50,000 m^{2})
- Floors: 7 (retail) + 5 (underground and rooftop parking)
- Parking: 1800
- Website: www.citycentremangalore.com

City Centre is a shopping mall in Mangaluru, India. It is the fifth largest mall in Karnataka and the second largest mall in Mangaluru located at the K S Rao Road in Mangalore. It was opened to the public on 25 April 2010. It provides shopping, dining, entertainment and leisure activities.

== Controversies ==
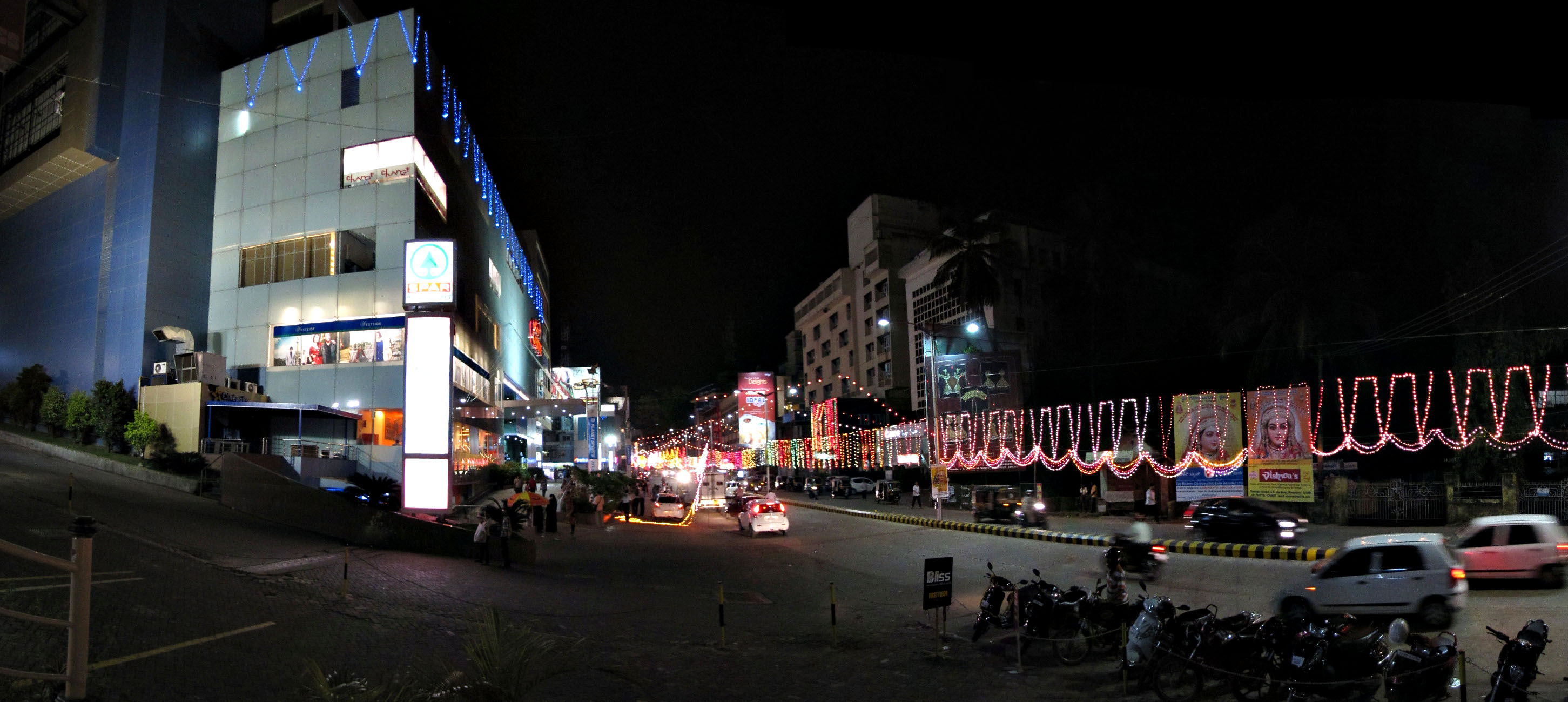
City Centre Mall

=== Building violations and other irregularities ===
There were a number of controversies surrounding the mall's construction. According to a news report published in August 2009, the unscientific excavation done for the building posed a threat to Bavutagudda (Light House Hill), a place of historic prominence in Mangalore. The excavation would have been dangerous to the residents of Bavutagudda. Consequently, the then Deputy Commissioner (DC) of Mangalore had ordered the builders to build a retention wall.

On 20 April 2009, there was an order issued by the Mangalore City Corporation (MCC) commissioner to demolish certain parts of the building including the seventh and eighth floor. As per the order, the building was not being constructed as per the approved blueprint. The builders brought a stay on the order.

The Karnataka State Pollution Control Board (KSPCB) had served a notice to the builders for causing environmental pollution. Three chimneys were installed without taking required permission from KSPCB. The smoke from the chimney was causing inconvenience to the nearby residents and they had lodged a complaint with KSPCB.

Prior to its inauguration on 25 April 2010, the Town Planning Officer of MCC made a statement saying it was illegal to go ahead with the opening of the mall without clearances. Four days prior to the inauguration, the MCC had served notice to the owners of the mall to vacate the building since the Fire and Emergency Services Department had not given a no-objection certificate.

In August 2012, social activists had accused the then DC of Mangalore of showing unnecessary interest in regularizing the building. The DC himself had refused to give permission to a multiplex in the building as the building had not been given clearances from various departments. However, just before he was transferred to Bengaluru in December 2012, he had issued license to the multiplex.

=== Assault on employees ===
On 31 July 2010, four salesmen of the Mochi Shoe Shop at the mall were reportedly attacked. As per reports, one of the salesmen had washed his lunch box in a basin inside the bathroom. This did not go well with Mr. Dharmaraj, an architect at Mohtisham Complexes, also in-charge of the mall and he objected. Later, it is believed that, on orders from Mr. Dharmaraj, a group of 12 people barged to the shoe shop and attacked the four salesmen. By 5 August 2010, four people were arrested in connection with the attack, but Mr. Dharmaraj along with another accused had applied for anticipatory bail and had gone into hiding.

== Fire break out ==
On 21 February 2019 a fire broke out in the mall.

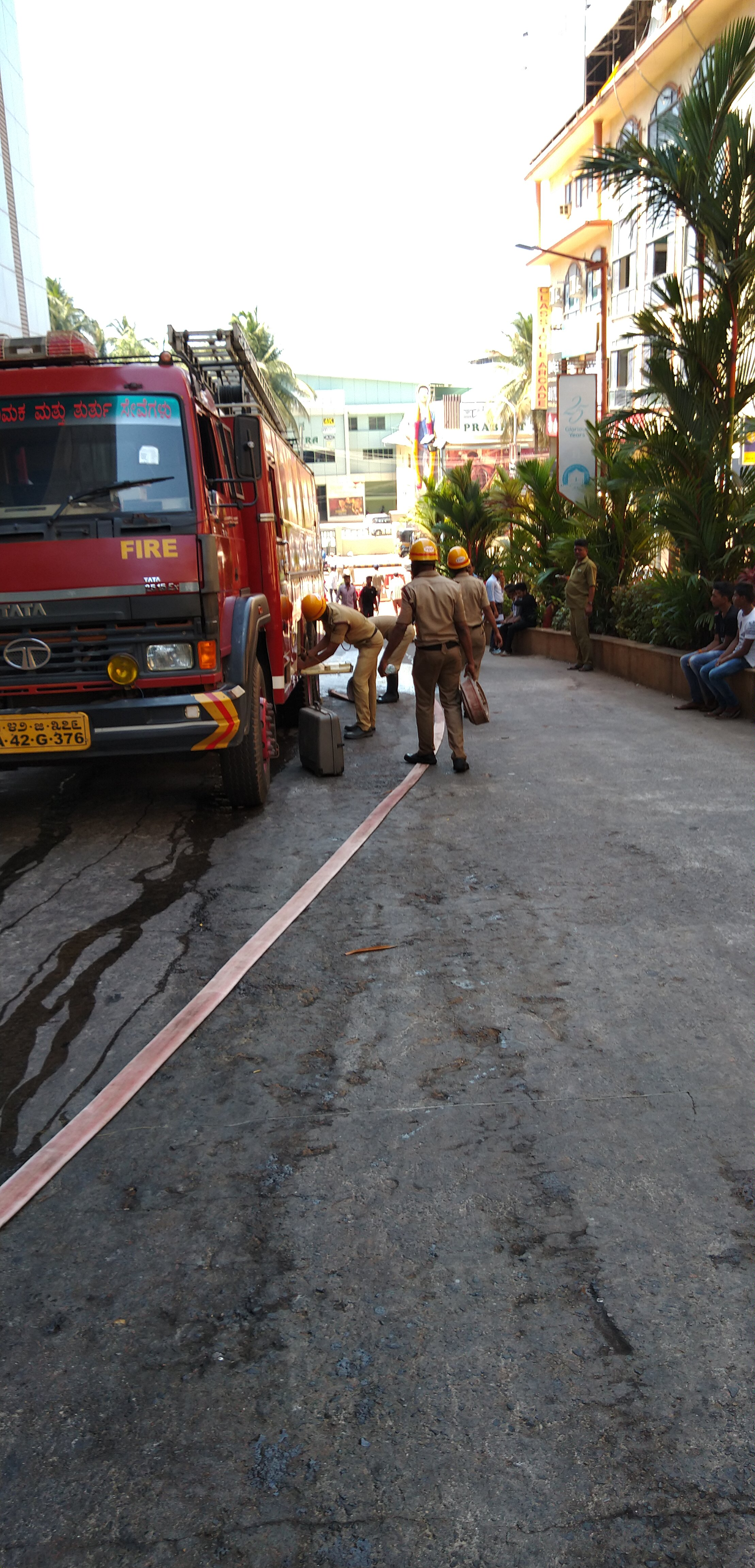
Fire response to City Center Mall, Mangalore on 21 February 2019

== See also ==
- Economy of Mangaluru
- List of shopping malls in India
