= Gokarnanatheshwara Temple =

Gokarnatheshwara Temple
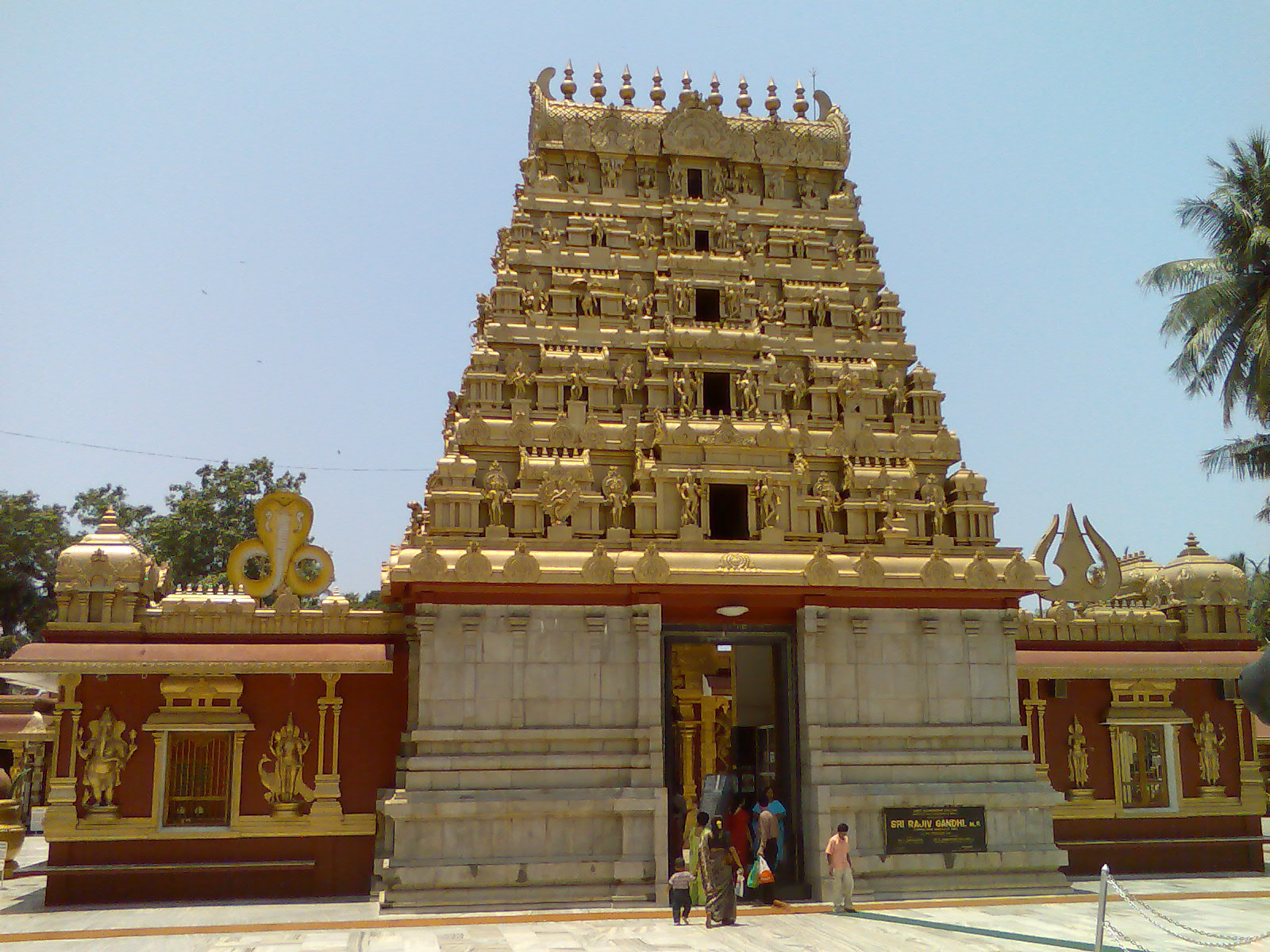
- Kudroli Shree Gokarnatheshwara Temple

Religion
- Affiliation: Hinduism
- District: Dakshina Kannada
- Deity: Gokarnanatha
- Festivals: Maha Shivaratri, Navrathri, Deepavali, Dasara, Sri Narayana Jayanthi

Location
- Location: Kudroli, Mangalore
- State: Karnataka
- Country: India
- Interactive map of Gokarnatheshwara Temple
- Coordinates: 12.876119°N 74.831554°E

Architecture
- Style: Dravidian Architecture
- Creator: Narayana Guru

Website
- http://www.kudroligokarnanatha.com/

The Gokarnanatheshwara Temple, otherwise known as Kudroli Sri Gokarnanatha Kshetra, is in the Kudroli area of Mangalore in Karnataka, India. It was consecrated by Narayana Guru. It is dedicated to Gokarnanatha, a form of Lord Shiva. This temple was built in 1912 by Adhyaksha HoigeBazar Koragappa.

This temple is now accepted as "Aadi" by the Billava community.

The temple is 2 km from the centre of Mangalore city. The temple has Gopuram (tower like structure) decorated with murals of various gods and goddesses. Murals depict scenes from Hindu epics and legends.

== History ==
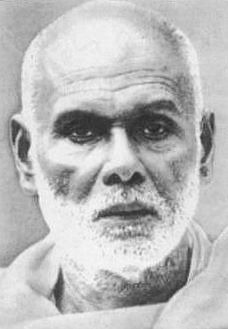
Narayana Guru: Spiritual Guru

=== Origin ===
The Billavas are Aboriginals/ Natives of the Western Ghats and the Western Coast of Karnataka. This civilization was so advanced that they had developed their own language (mother tongue/ dialect) to communicate called TULU. They even had their own martial art centres called GARADIs. They had their own spiritual practise called KOLA. They also had their own dance form better said to be a performing art/ complete theatre called YAKSHAGANA (Paduvalapaya(Thenkuthittu)) The Billava civilisation even though being so old were yet very organised and complete as a society. The best example being the division of work

AMINs - A group of people among the Billavas who specialised in land and land measurement

POOJARY/ PUJARI - A group of people among the Billavas who specialised in spiritual practises ( mostly being worship of Ganas, Daivas or forms(ANSH/ Parts)of Lord SHIVA and Maa Parvati. The worship through which they believed they could more easily access Lord Shiva.

BAIDYA - A group of people among Billavas who specialised in medicine

SUVARNA - A group of people among Billavas who specialised in precious metal like Gold and Silver and precious stones

BANGERA - A group of people among Billavas who specialised in water like Boat building/ fish (sea food) trade

KOTIAN - A group of people among Billavas who specialised in maintaining store houses and forts

KUKKIAN - A group of people among Billavas who specialised in maintaining mango orchards

KUNDAR - A group of people among Billavas who specialised in earthen (clay) ware and stone artifacts and carvings

TALWAR - A group of people among Billavas who specialised in swords

There are many more and the fact is the Billavas still use these as SURNAMES. As can be seen even though the civilisation of the Billavas was ancient yet they were so well organised internally with this division of work and yet externally were one cohesive unit called the BILLAVAS

In spite of the atrocities and subjugation of Invaders like the Portuguese, Islamic rulers (Tipu sultan/ Hyder Ali) and the British, the Billavas due to their warrior spirit and intellect were able to retain nearly all of their cultural practices and identity. They form the highest population still in the place of their origin such as Mangalore (Dakshina Karnataka) and Udupi

The first known empire of the Billvas was the Chera empire somewhere around 200 BCE.

The Chera Kings of the Chera dynasty(200 BCE - 1100 CE) had the title of Villavar(Billava). It is known that several Villavar/ Billava clans came together to form an early Chera Empire along the Western coast and Western Ghats in South India. The early Cheras were around the region of Muziris. Muziris was identified as the region around Mangalore in Southwestern Karnataka. The Chera Kingdom had an emblem of the Bow and Arrow (Billu/ Villu and Bana) on their flags. The silver punch marked coins of the Chera empire with the symbol of bow(Billu) have been discovered relating to the term Billavas. They then started moving towards and conquering parts of now Tamil Nadu, hence we see the confluence of many Tamil words in Titles and common addresses.Later with the advent of other sects like Nagas (example being shettys who consider themselves naga Kshatriyas) and Jains in the region, influenced the Chera kingdoms cultural practises such as Naga worship and building of Jain monasteries. With the rise of other empires like the Pandyas and Cholas, the Chera empire slowly came to an end starting from 5th century CE.

There is brief mention of the Chera empire by Kautilya(Chanakya)(3-4 century BCE), Katyayana (3-4 century BCE), Patanjali (5 century BCE) among others.

The other most recent, famous and prosperous empire is the Tuluva Dynasty (1491 - 1570 AD) of the Vijayanagar empire. Krishnadevaraya of the Vijayanagar empire was Tulu speaking and Tulu is spoken only along coastal karnataka namely Mangalore (Dakshina Karnataka) and Udupi.Since billavas were the aboriginals/ natives speaking Tulu this dynasty and its warlords were definitely a part of them.

The Billava community wanted to carve a niche for themselves in the realm of spirituality. They wanted to be able to personalise the spiritual offering to their deity Lord Shiva with norms in accordance to the billava tradition. It is in such a scenario that Adhyaksha Koragappa a billava leader and businessman took the initiative and sought a Guru for this spiritual quest.

Adhyaksha Koragappa led a delegation of Billava elders and visited Shri Narayana Guru in 1908. He invited Shri Narayana Guru to guide the billavas to build a temple.

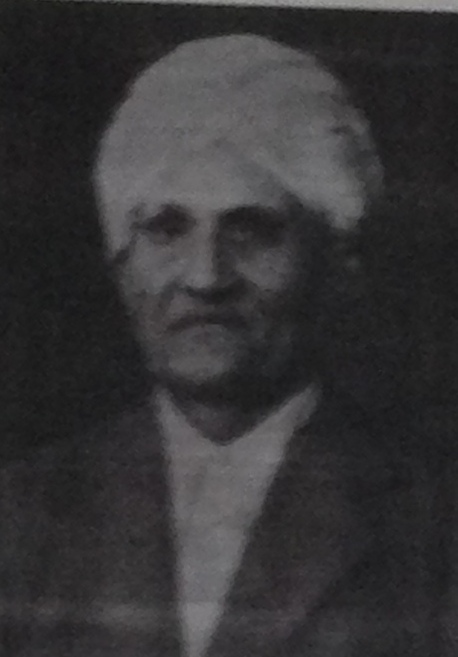
Adhyaksha Koragappa, the Founder of the Gokarnanatheshwara Temple, Kudroli. A great devotee of Shri Narayana Guru and Bhagawan Nityananda of Ganeshpuri

The community found a messiah in Narayana Guru to guide them in this spiritual quest. Narayana Guru with his knowledge and experience in spirituality became the ideal guide and guru (from the south of India closest to Mangalore) for the billavas to help them build a temple of their deity, Lord Shiva.

Adhyaksha Koragappa was a very well known businessman in Mangalore who had a large tile factory. He also conducted extensive trade in the 1900s with business enterprises in Middle East, Africa, Singapore, Malaysia, Sri Lanka and Myanmar, trading mainly in Mangalore tiles, copra, spices and other natural products.

On the arrival of Shri Narayana Guru in Mangalore, Adhyaksha Koragappa gave him a horse-driven carriage to select a suitable place for a temple. Narayana Guru between places Mulihithilu (where a lot of linga Roopa Aradhana used to happen especially from saints of NATH tradition) and Kudroli, selected Kudroli.

Koragappa family still maintains the CHAIR on which Shri Narayana Guru sat in Adhyaksha Koragappa's house and addressed Adhyaksha Koragappa and others regarding various issues including the creation of a temple.

Adhyaksha Koragappa then gave the necessary land and funds to build this temple in 1912 seeking blessings and spiritual guidance of Shri Narayana Guru. The Shiva linga was brought by Shri Narayana Guru himself.

Following the tenure of Adhyaksha Koragappa, B. R Karkera assumed leadership. Under B.R.Karkera's leadership, “Harijans” were allowed to enter temples. Sharadha visarjane is the charm of the Mangalore Dussehra and is now considered as a national attraction, was started by B.R.Karkera. He funded Rs. 2,000 for the initial concrete structure of the Kudroli temple.

Adornment: B.R.Karkera donated Rs. 4,000 specifically for the intricate idol jewelry of the goddess Annapoorneshwari.

Land Donation: B.R.Karkera provided the land that the temple utilizes today for its vehicle parking facilities.B.R.Karkera

=== Renovation ===
Shri H. Somasunder, Adhyaksha Koragappa's son was the president, during whose tenure effort was put into renovating the temple. Shri H. Somasunder along with Vishwanath approached Shri Janardhan Poojary for the same. This was the start of the renovation of the temple with the help of the people in various forms from all parts of the world especially Mangalore, Udupi and Mumbai. Sthapadi K. Dakshinamoorthy was the architect who designed and built the present temple in the Chola style of architecture from its original Kerala style. The new gopuram is 60 feet in height and very beautiful. The renovated Gokarnanatha Kshethra was inaugurated by the former Prime Minister of India Rajiv Gandhi in 1991, shortly before his assassination during an election rally. A marble statue of Narayana Guru was erected at the entrance of the temple in 1966 and a crown studded with precious gems was given by the devotees later. It's estimated the renovation cost Rs. 1 crore, and now it has become one of the largest temples in Mangalore.

Later in the year 2007 Bhagwaan Hanumaan Mandir was built in the Gokarnanatha Kshethra premises at the entrance. Bhagwaan Hanumaan Mandir in turn adds beauty to the Kshethra.

The samadhis of H. Koragappa, H. Somappa along with their deceased family members lie with appropriate markers in the family plot in Gori Gudde (cemetery) in Attavar, Mangalore. The tomb of Uggappu, Shri Koragappa's mother can still be found in Gori Gudde erected by Shri Koragappa himself

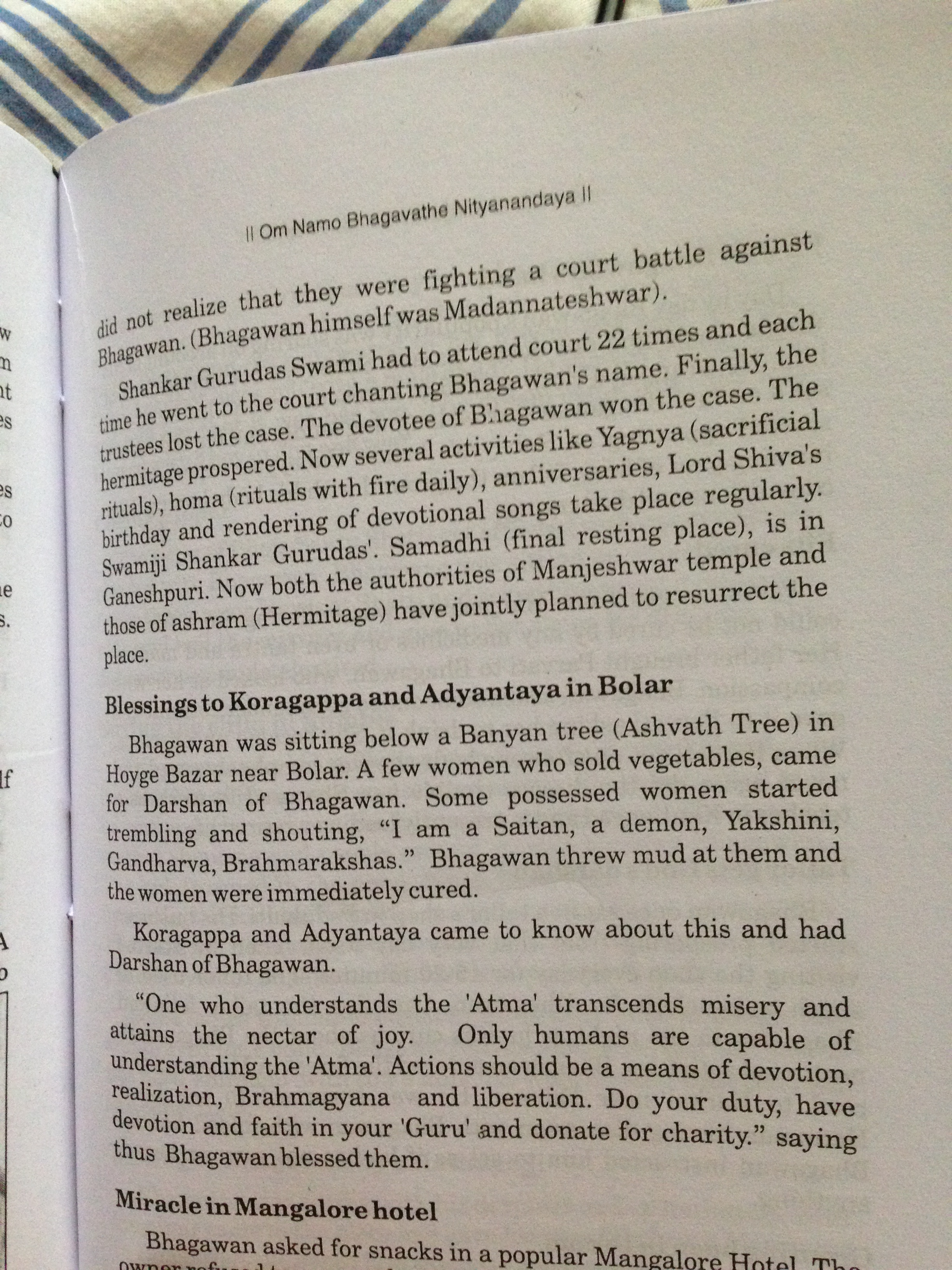
Pages from a book that describes the first meeting of Bhagawan Nityananda and Adhyaksha Koragappa at Hoige Bazaar, Mangalore

Adhyaksha Koragappa (who sometimes used 'C' Coragappa instead of 'K' to bring luck in business) was also a great devotee of Bhagawan Nityananda of Ganeshpuri and Bhagawan performed several miracles at the home of Adhyaksha Koragappa on Goodshed Road in Bunder. The first meeting of Bhagawan Nityananda and Adhyaksha Koragappa is described in the book Avadhoot Bhagawan Nityananda, on page 31. The book is authored by Swami Vijayananda of Nityananda Dhyana Mandira, Bevinakoppa.

Today HS Sairam, Adhyaksha Koragappa's grandson is the president and continues this legacy and vision of Shree Adhyaksha Koragappa to help spirituality empower and enable masses. This along with Sairam's effort to enhance the grandeur of the temple, the latest addition being the Mahastamba where he personally visited Kerala and got the design crafted by able designers.

== Miracles of Narayana Guru ==
Narayana Guru was revered in the southern part of India for his spiritual quests in the field of non dualism. He performed many miracles helping people all along.

== Festivals ==
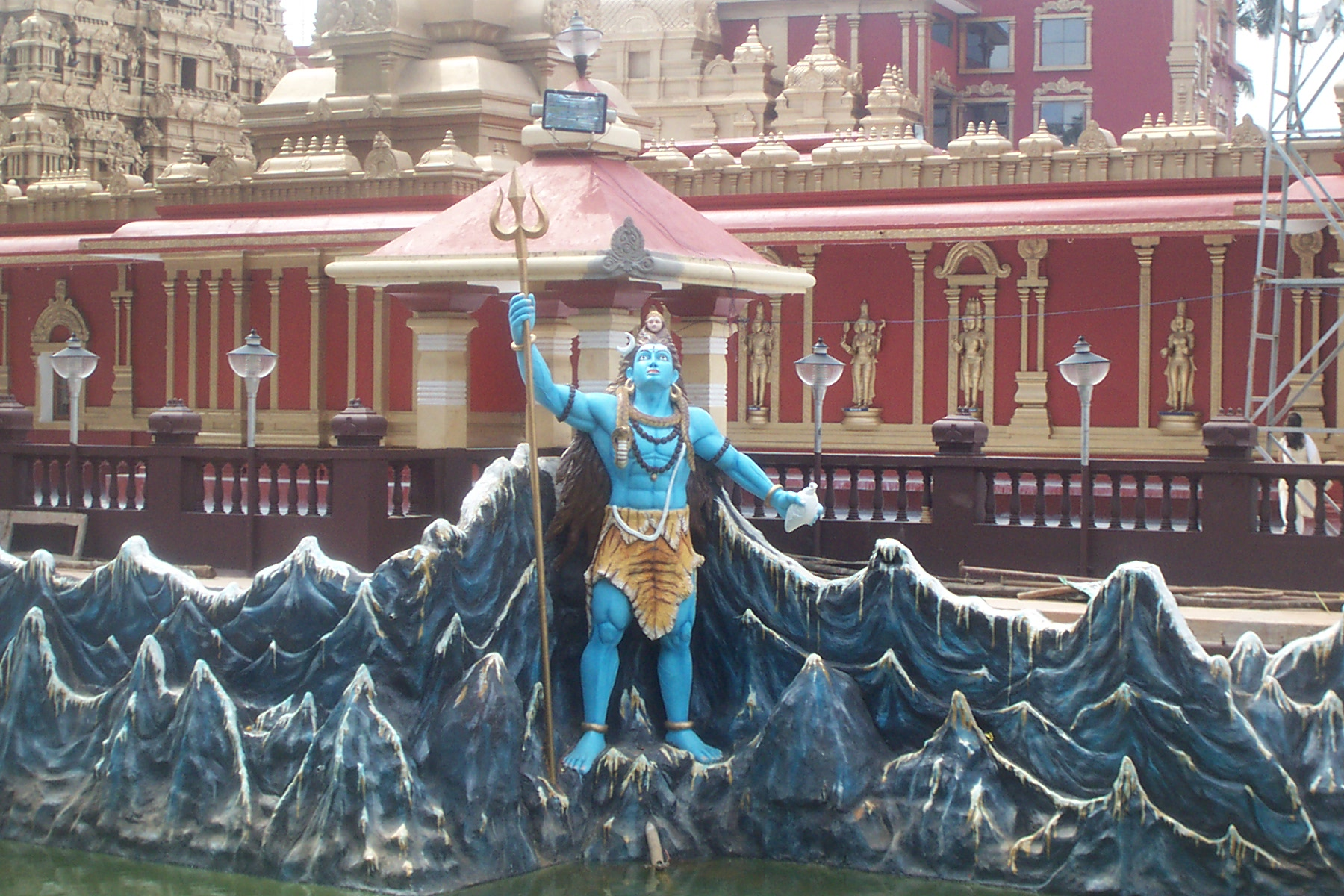
The view of the temple pond showing the statue of Shiva

The temple observes many festivals. Maha Shivaratri, Krishnashtami, Ganesh Chaturthi, Nagara Panchami, Deepavali, Navaratri, Sri Narayana Jayanthi are celebrated with traditional gaiety and splendour. It has worshipers from all over the world. The temples branches are in Mulki, Udupi and Katpady.

The birthday of Sri Narayana Guru is ceremoniously followed. The Kshethra also follows the ritual of feeding devotees who visit it daily.

Community Sri Satyanarayana Pooja, Sri Shani Pooja, free mass marriages and distribution of scholarship to deserving students are traditions, too. Today, the Kshethra attracts devotees from all religions and communities. The Billava community has come of age. The Kshethra can be rightly called the melting pot of all religions symbolising unity in diversity.

=== Navaratri ===
The dasara festival is celebrated with much grandeur. The dasara celebrations of this temple is popularly called Mangalore Dasara. Mangalore Dasara was started by B.R.Karkera.
In addition to idols of Sharada Matha and Maha Ganapati, life-size idols of Nava Durgas are installed in the premises in an attractive way during Navaratri. All religious rites are observed for the entire period. Tableaux form a special part of the festivities and are taken around the main thoroughfares of Mangalore.
Mangalore Dasara is celebrated in a very spectacular way by worshiping the idol of Ganesh, Adhi Shakthi Maatha, Sharada Maatha, Navadurgas such as Shaila Puthri Maatha, Brahmachaarini Maatha, Chandrakaantha Maatha, Kushmaandini Maatha, Skanda Maatha, Kathyaahini Maatha, Maha Kaali Maatha, Maha Gowri Maatha and Siddhi Dhaathri Maatha. All these idols are grandly worshiped for nine days of navarathri. On the tenth day, these idols are taken in the grand procession of Mangalore Dasara throughout the city; the procession returns to Gokarnanatha Kshethra on the next day morning where all the above idols are immersed in the lake inside the temple premises.

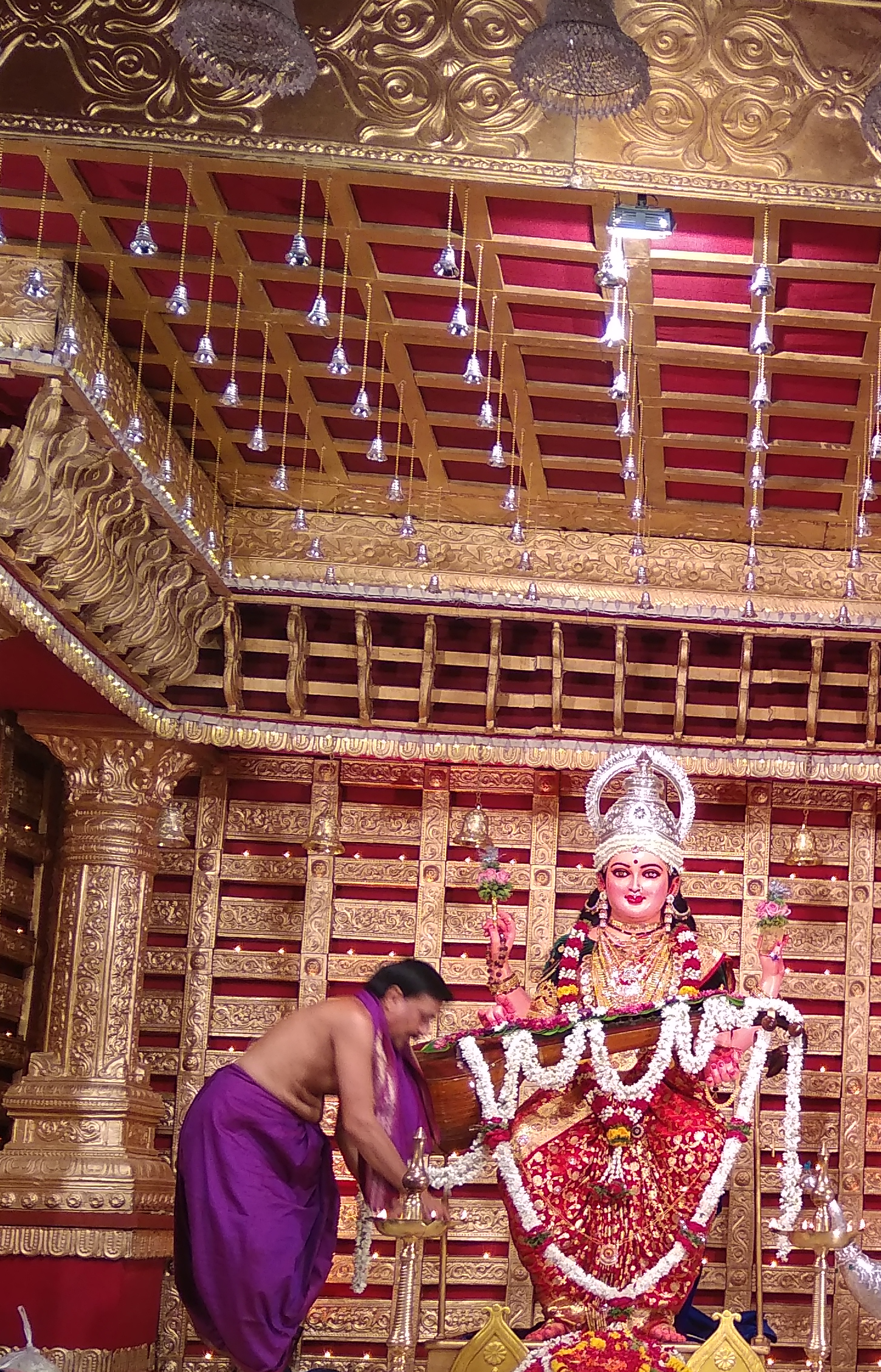
Grandeur of Navratri Celebrations in Kudroli Gokarnanatheshwara Temple Mangalore Main Deity Sharaddha Maatha

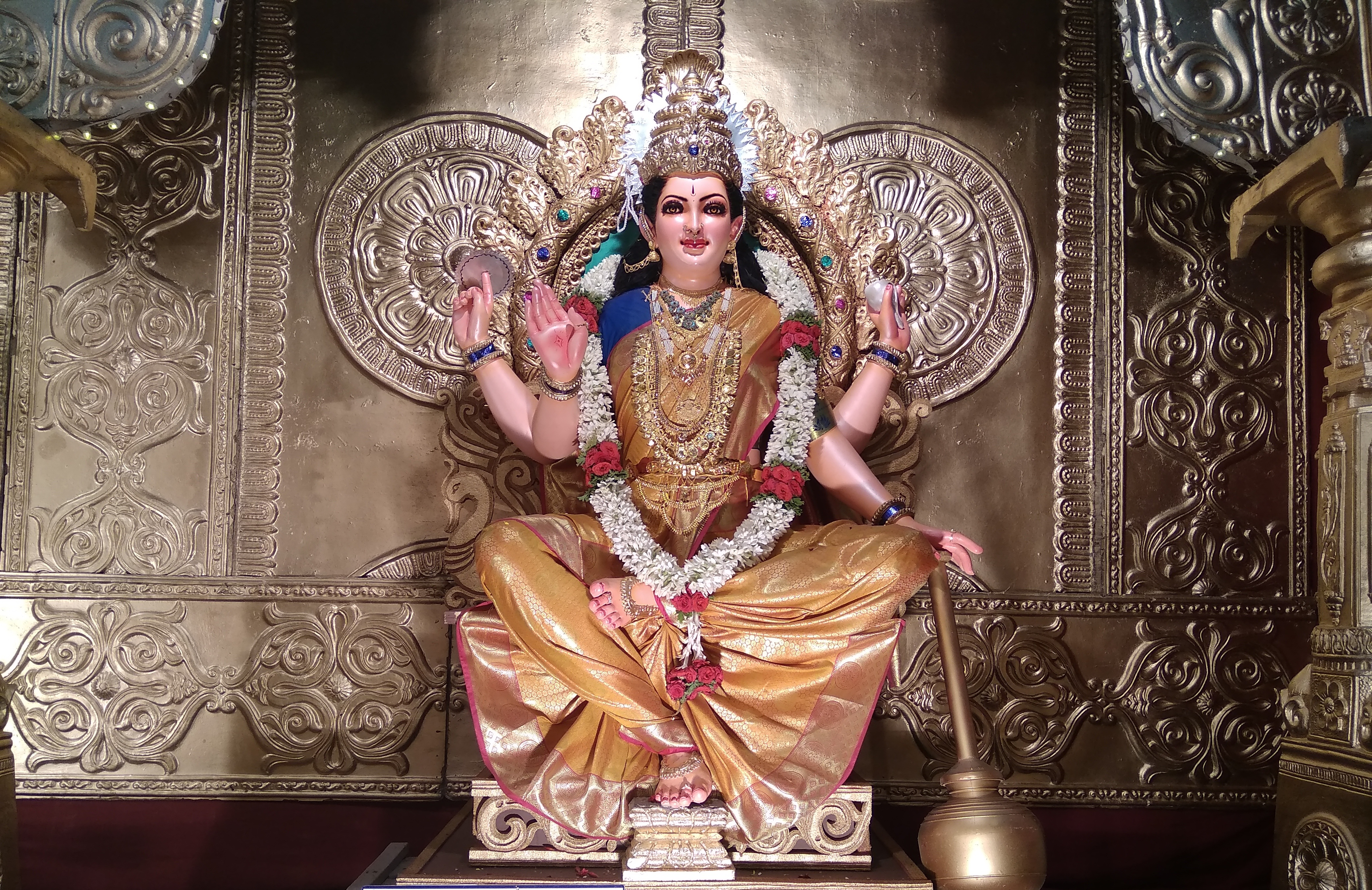
Grandeur of Navratri Celebrations in Kudroli Gokarnanatheshwara Temple Mangalore Siddhidhatri Devi

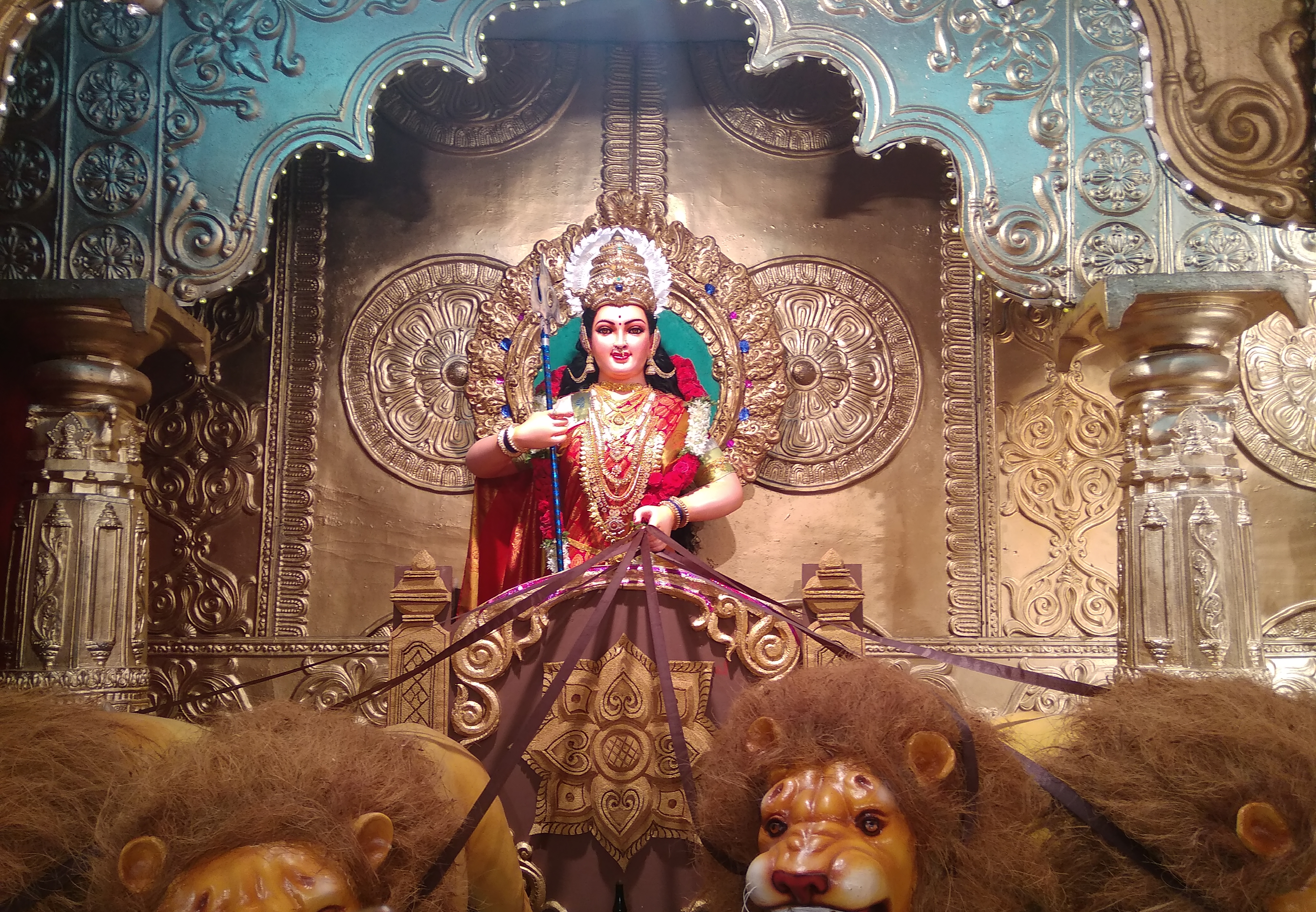
Grandeur of Navratri Celebrations in Kudroli Gokarnanatheshwara Temple Mangalore Kushmanda Devi

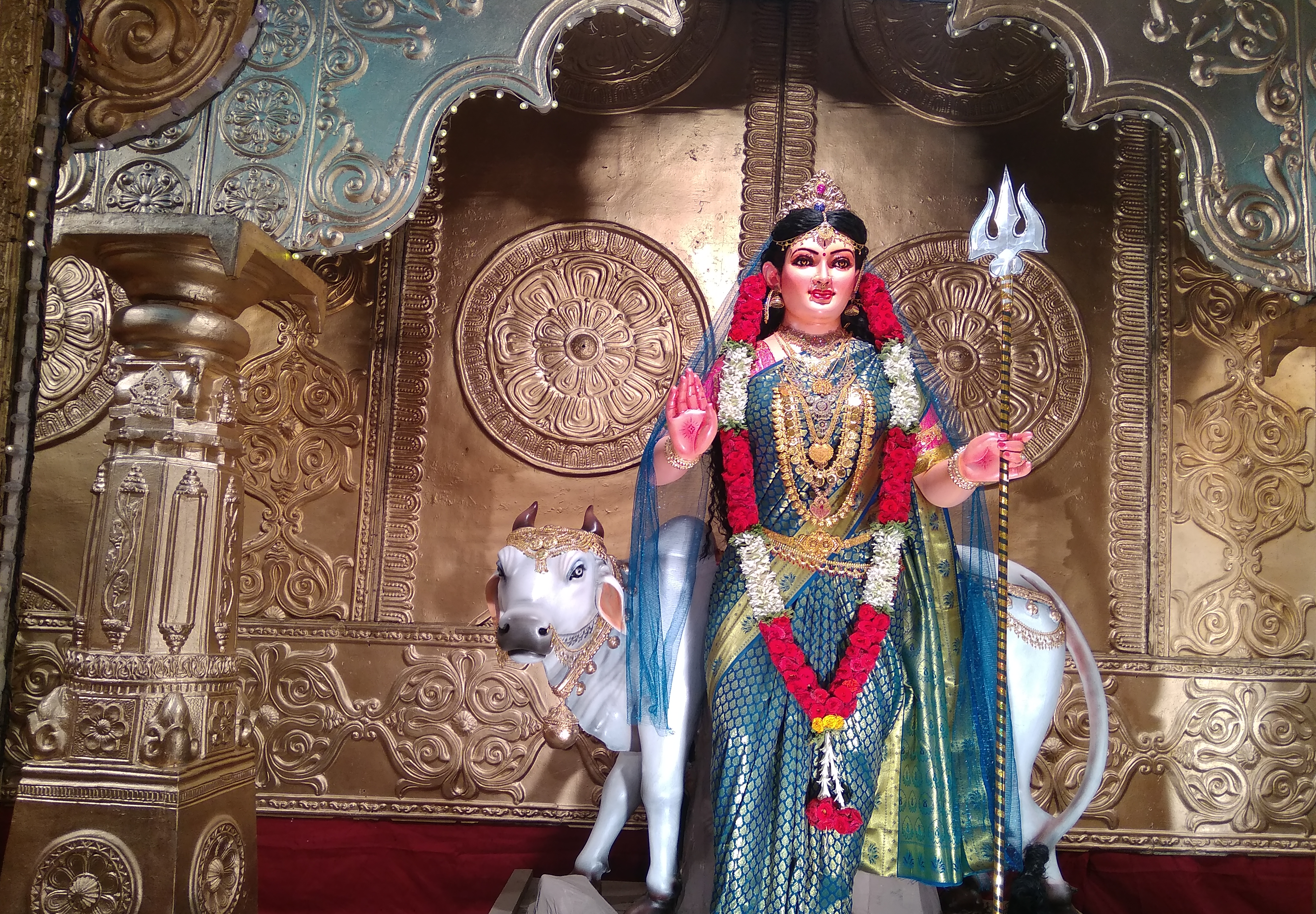
Grandeur of Navratri Celebrations in Kudroli Gokarnanatheshwara Temple Mangalore Shailaputri Devi

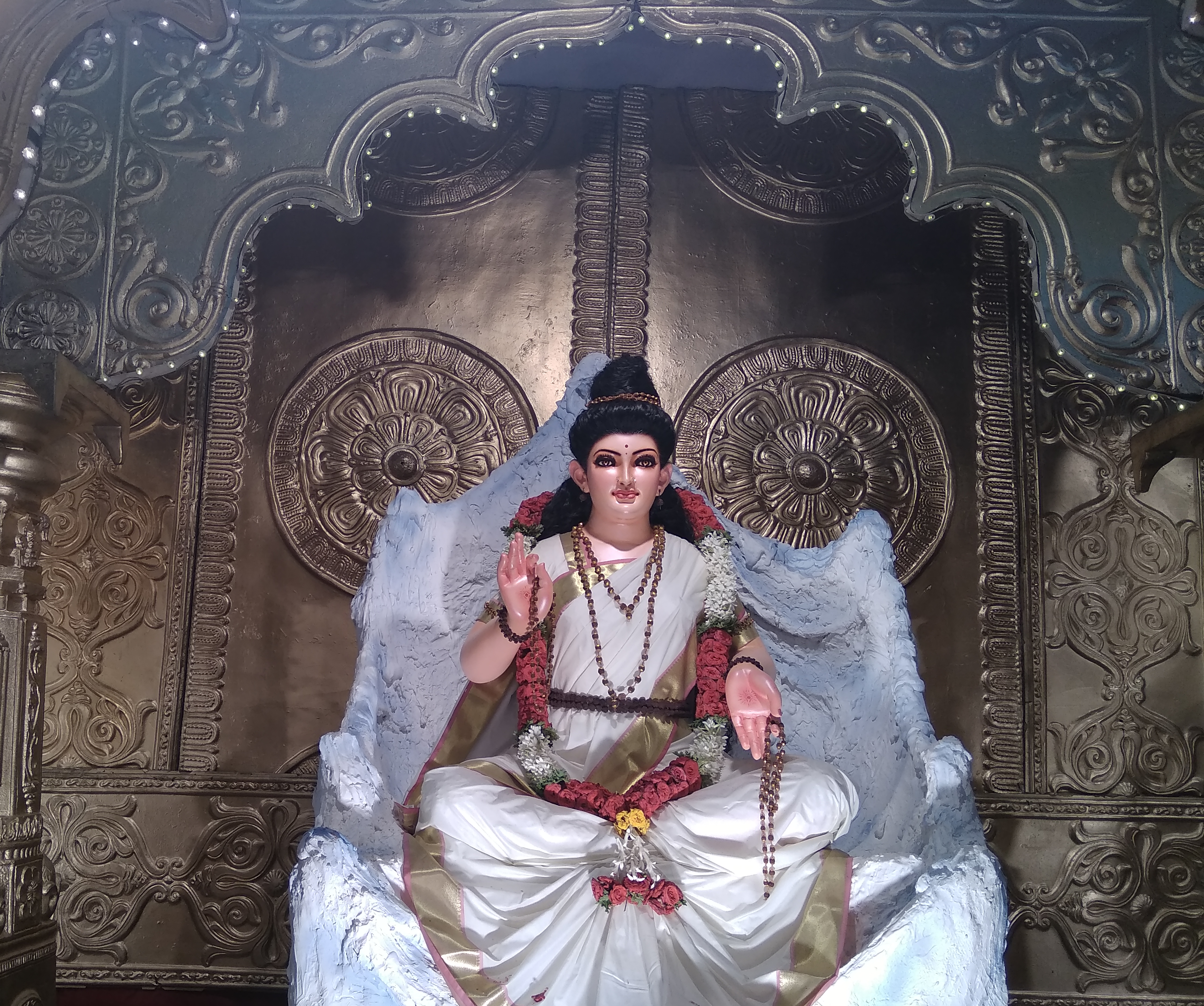
Grandeur of Navratri Celebrations in Kudroli Gokarnanatheshwara Temple Mangalore Brahmacharini Devi

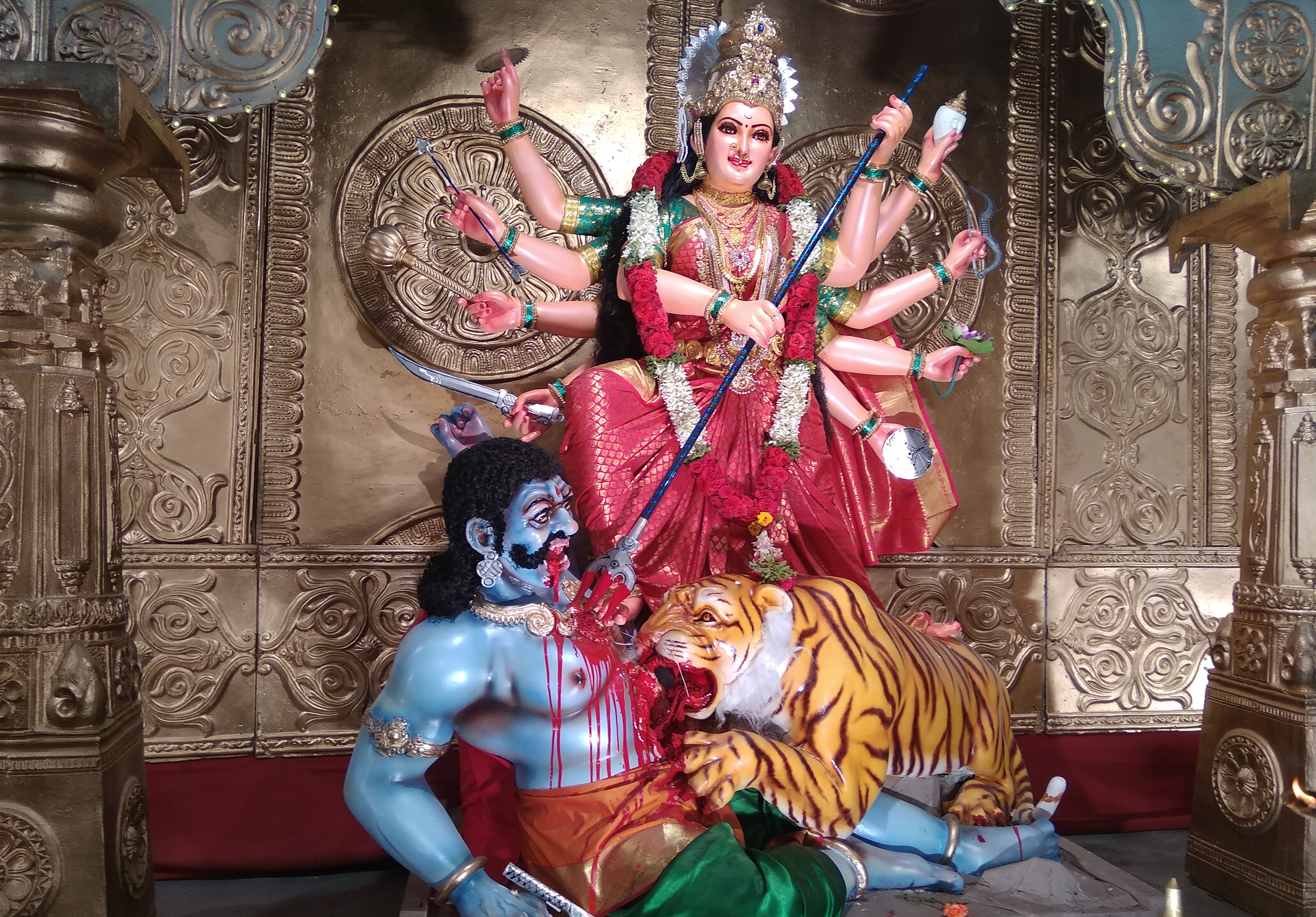
Grandeur of Navratri Celebrations in Kudroli Gokarnanatheshwara Temple Mangalore Durga Devi

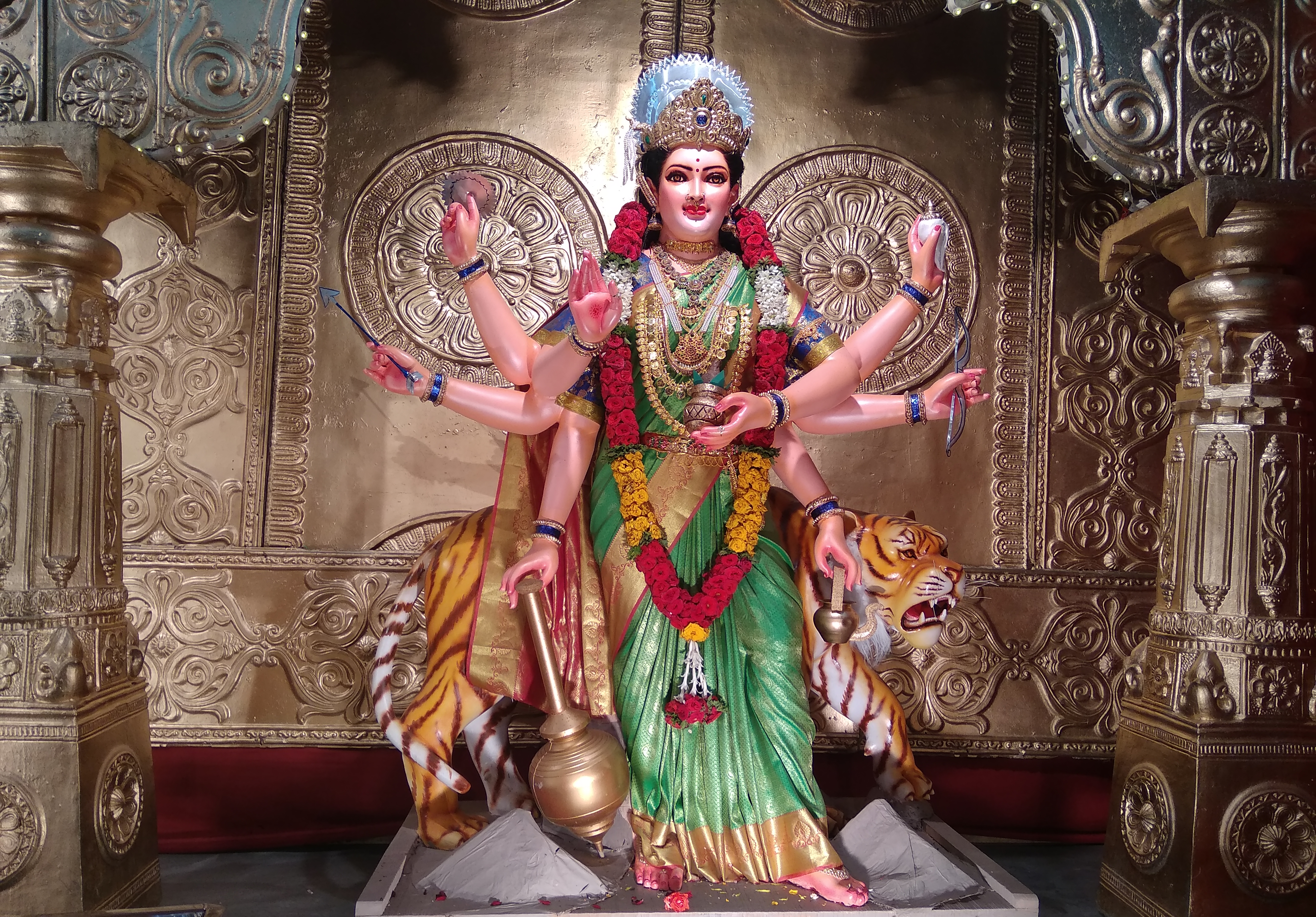
Grandeur of Navratri Celebrations in Kudroli Gokarnanatheshwara Temple Mangalore Chandraghanta Devi

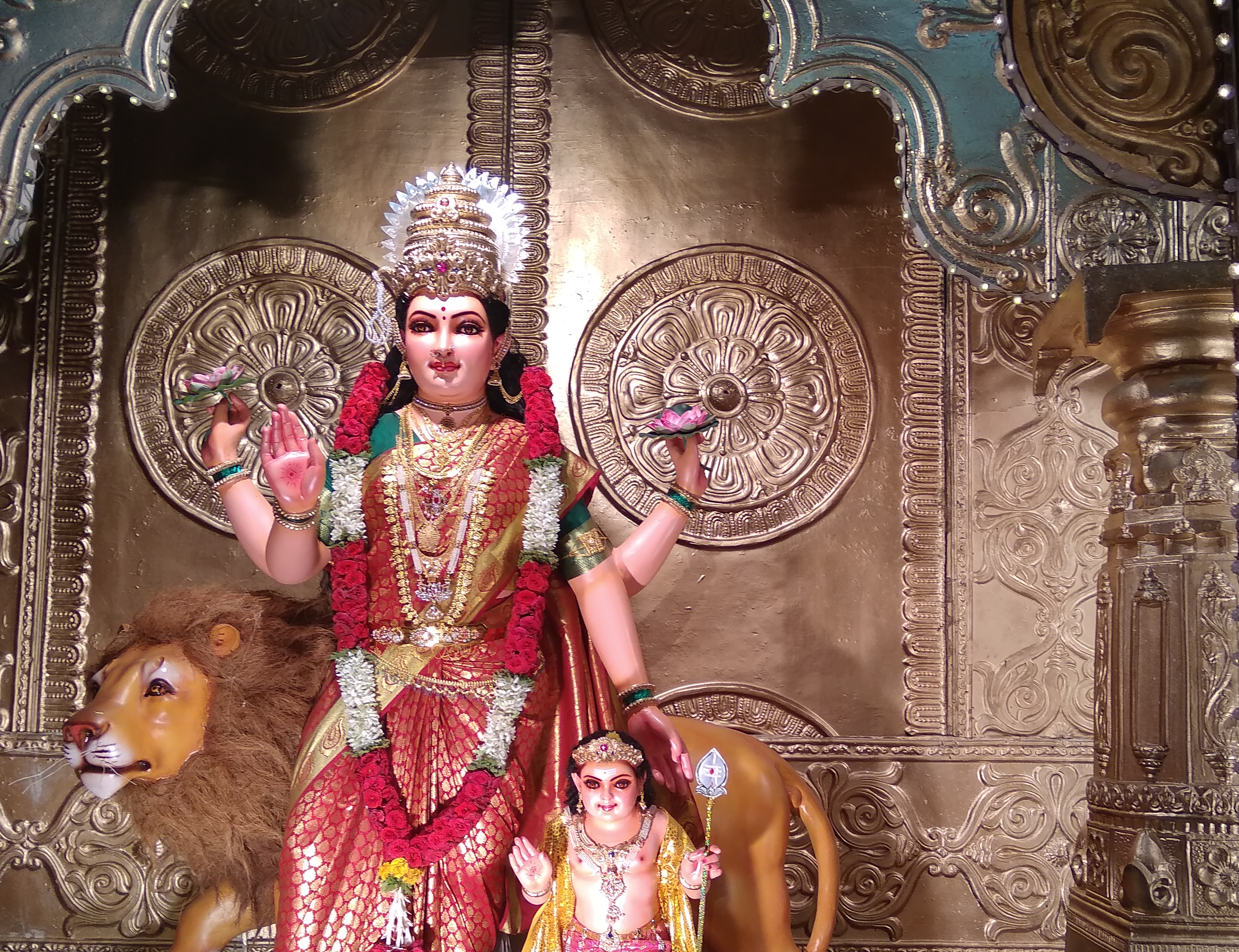
Grandeur of Navratri Celebrations in Kudroli Gokarnanatheshwara Temple Mangalore Skandamaata Devi

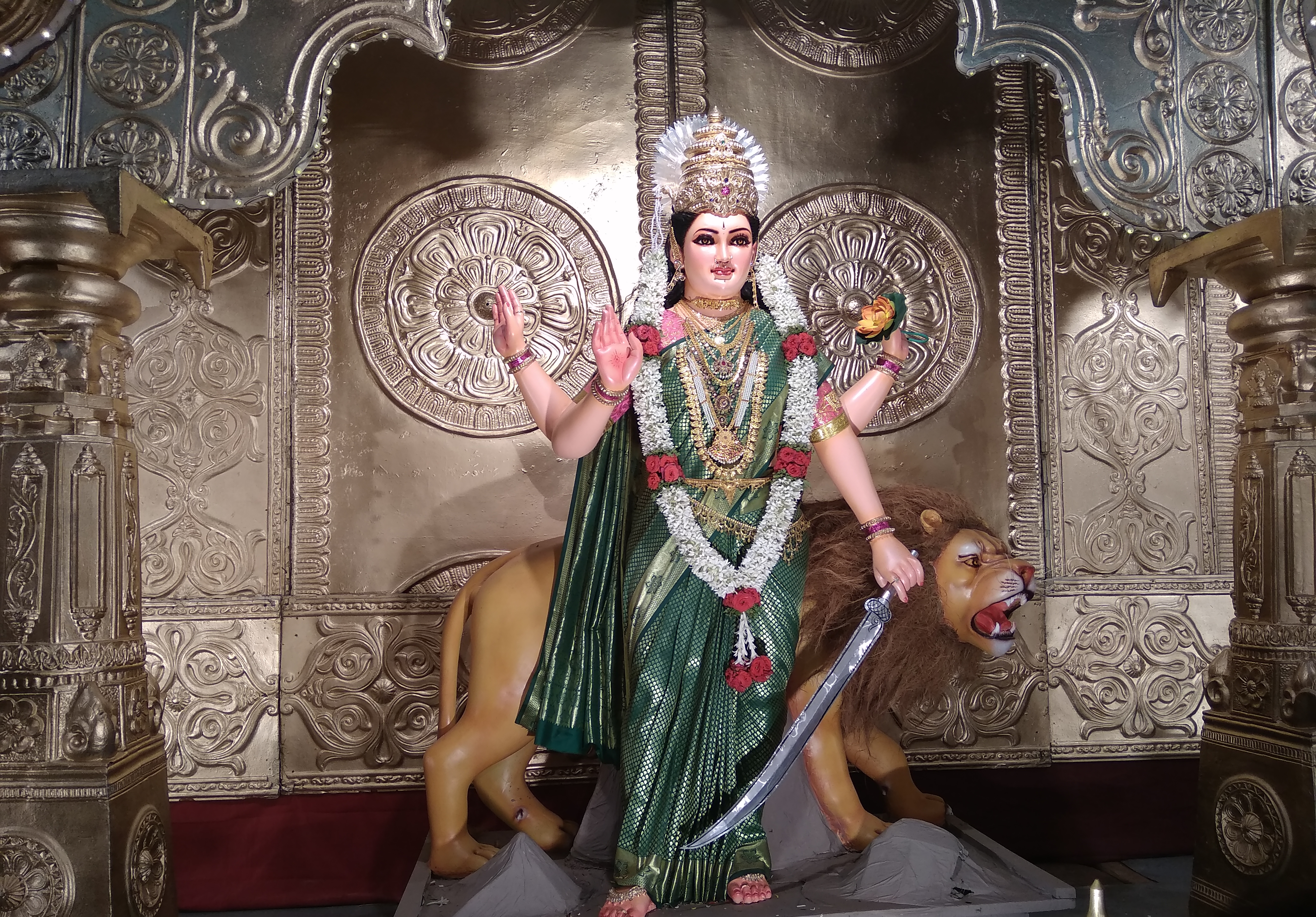
Grandeur of Navratri Celebrations in Kudroli Gokarnanatheshwara Temple Mangalore Katyayani Devi

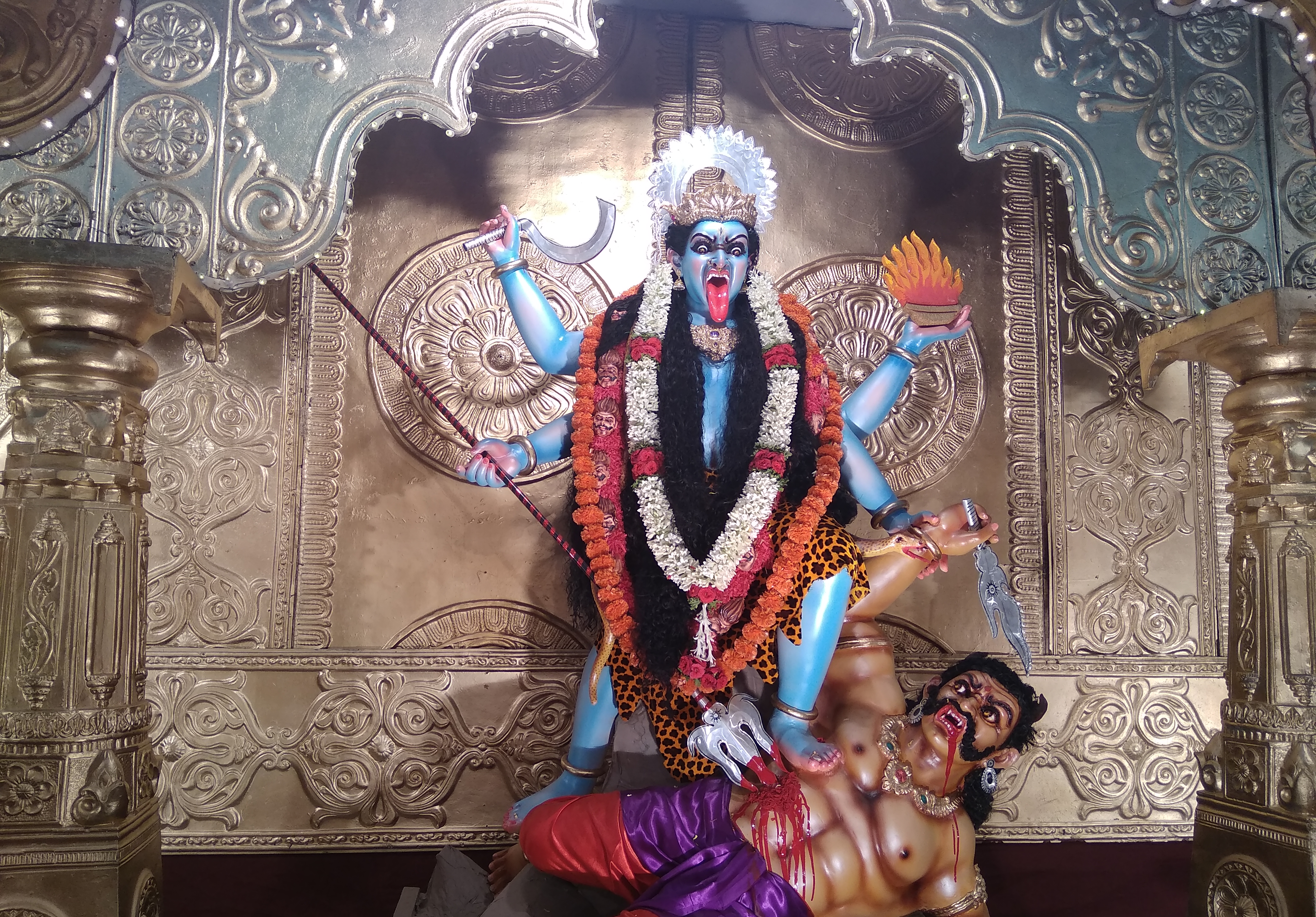
Grandeur of Navratri Celebrations in Kudroli Gokarnanatheshwara Temple Mangalore Kaalarati Devi

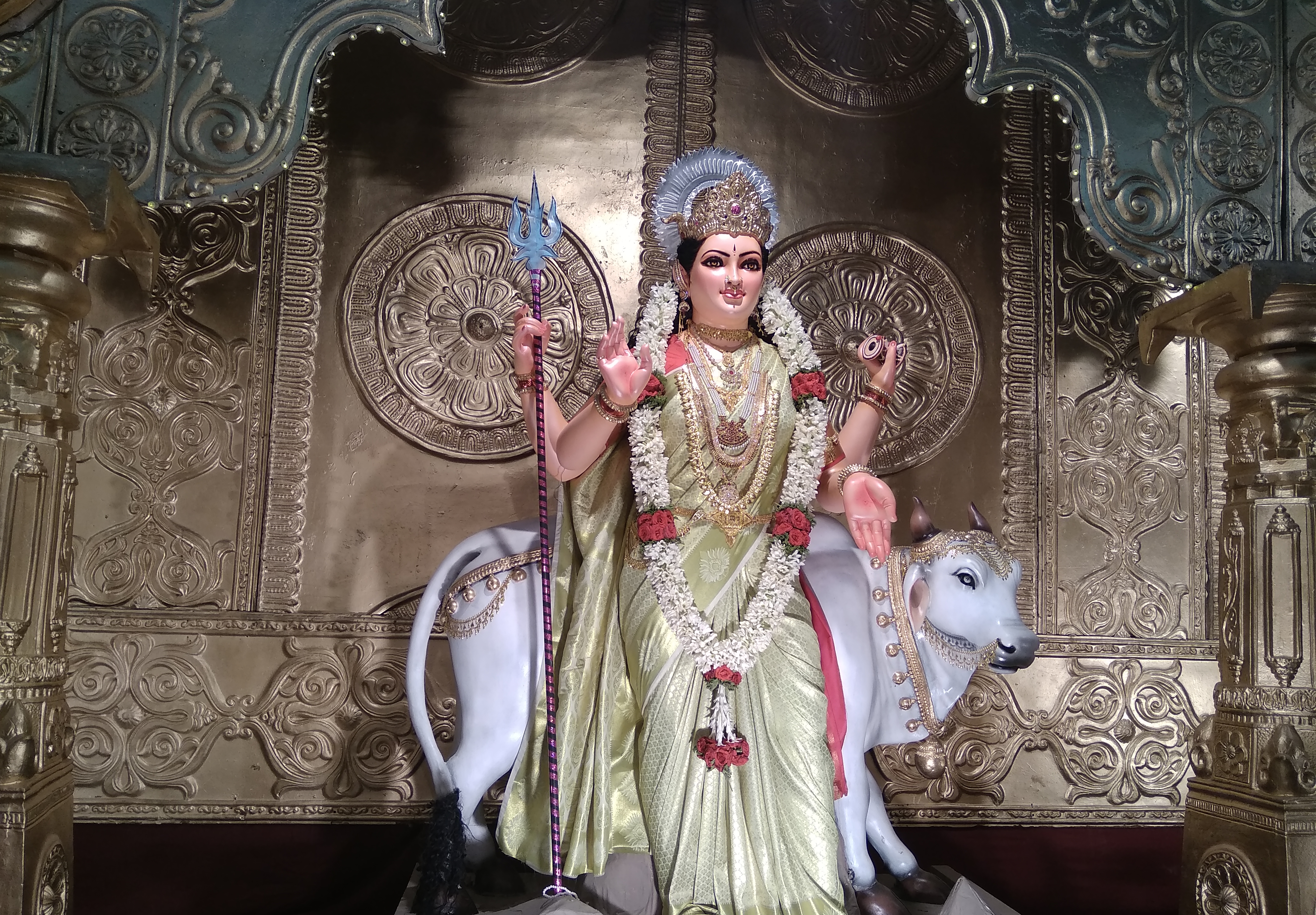
Grandeur of Navratri Celebrations in Kudroli Gokarnanatheshwara Temple Mangalore MahaGauri Devi

== Connectivity ==
This temple is situated in Kudroli which is about 5 km north of Mangalore Central. This temple is accessible from Statebank by bus(Route no 1,7,13) and from KSRTC, Airport by Auto rikshaw and Taxi.

== Controversies ==
Shri Janardhan Poojary performed Urul seva (rolling around the temple) so that Sonia Gandhi could be cured, and he could win the General elections of 2014. Since Shri Poojary is very much part of the administration of this temple, it would appear that the temple administration has injected politics into religion.

== Gallery ==
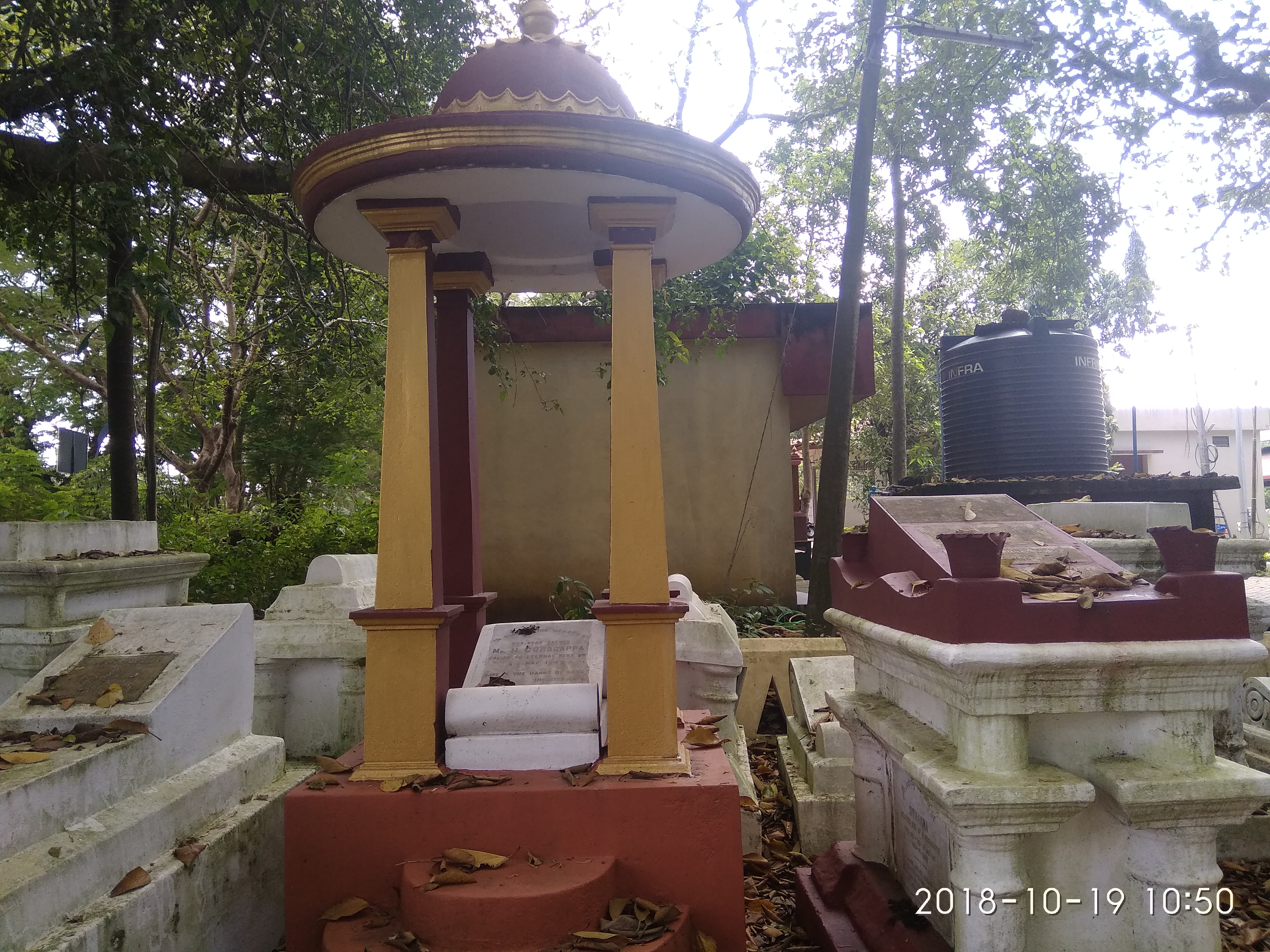
The chattri and Samadhi of Adhyaksha Koragappa in the family plot at Gori Gudde (Cemetery), Attavar, Mangalore. Shri Koragappa the builder of the Gokarnanatheshwara Temple.

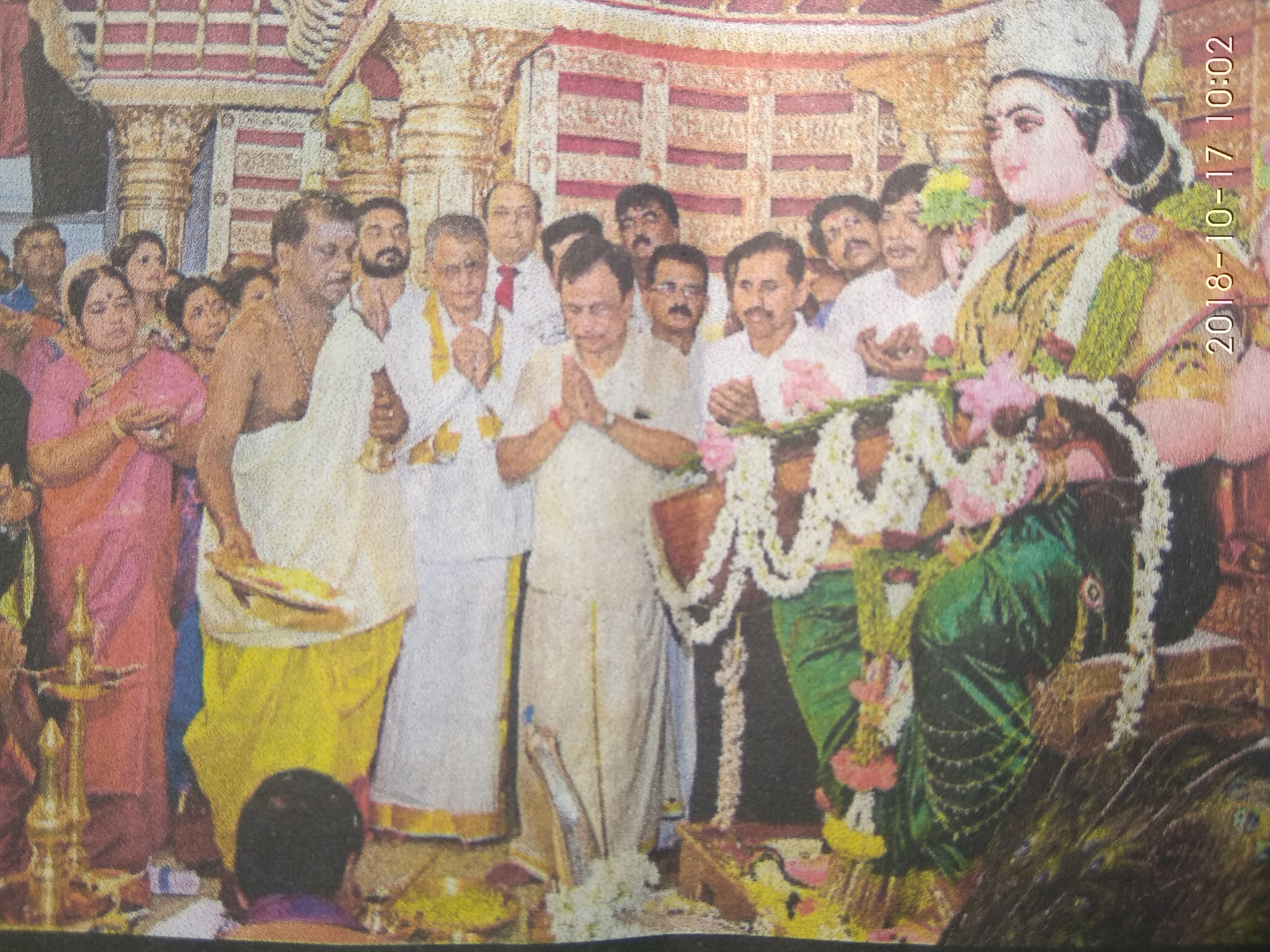
HS Sairam President and Grandson of H Koragappa kick starting the Dasara celebrations 2018 published by a leading national newspaper Deccan Herald

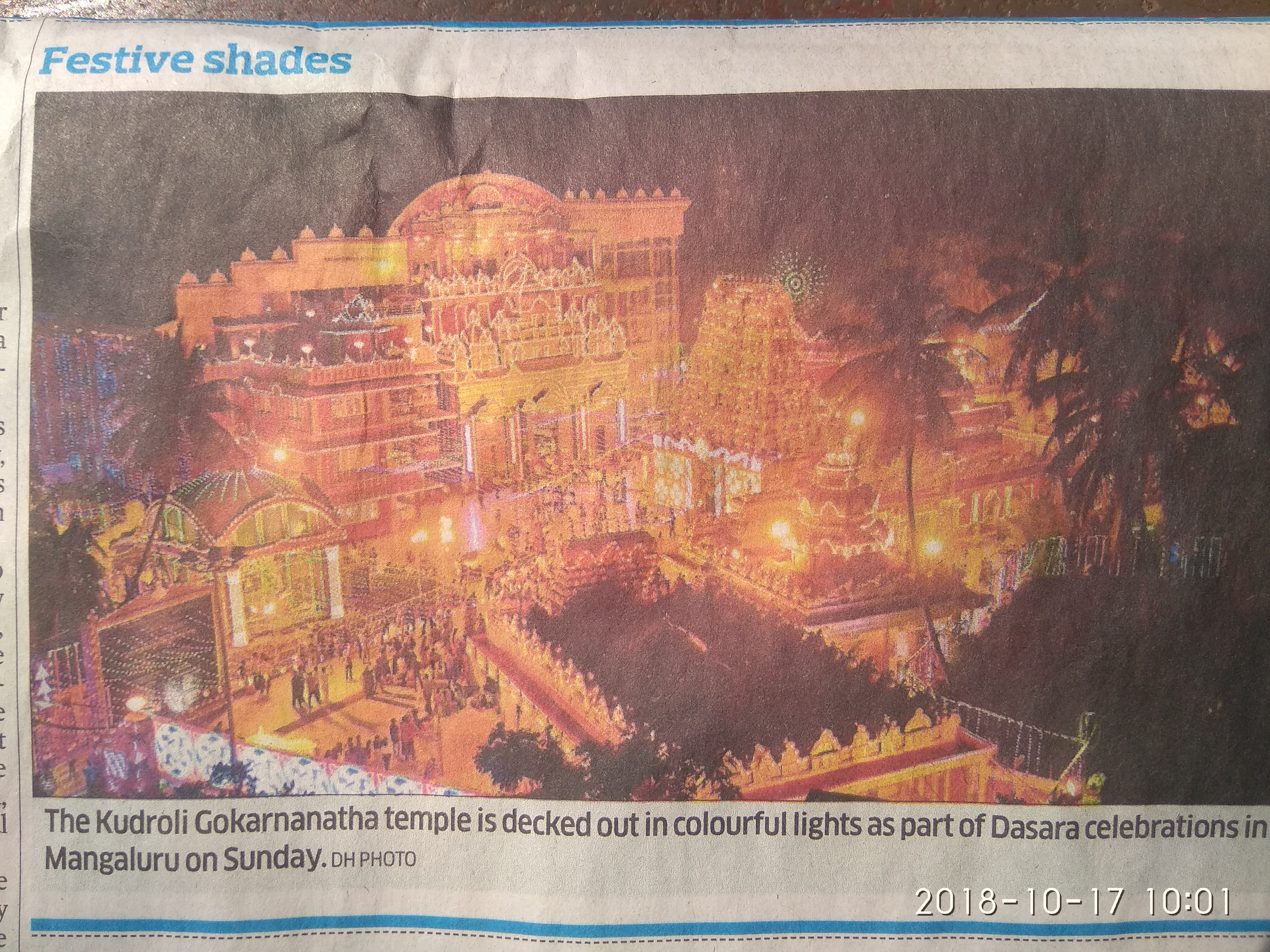
Heaven on Earth - Grandeur of Dasara celebrations 2018 at Kudroli temple as captured and reported by a leading national daily Deccan Herald

Guru Jayanthi celebration at the temple

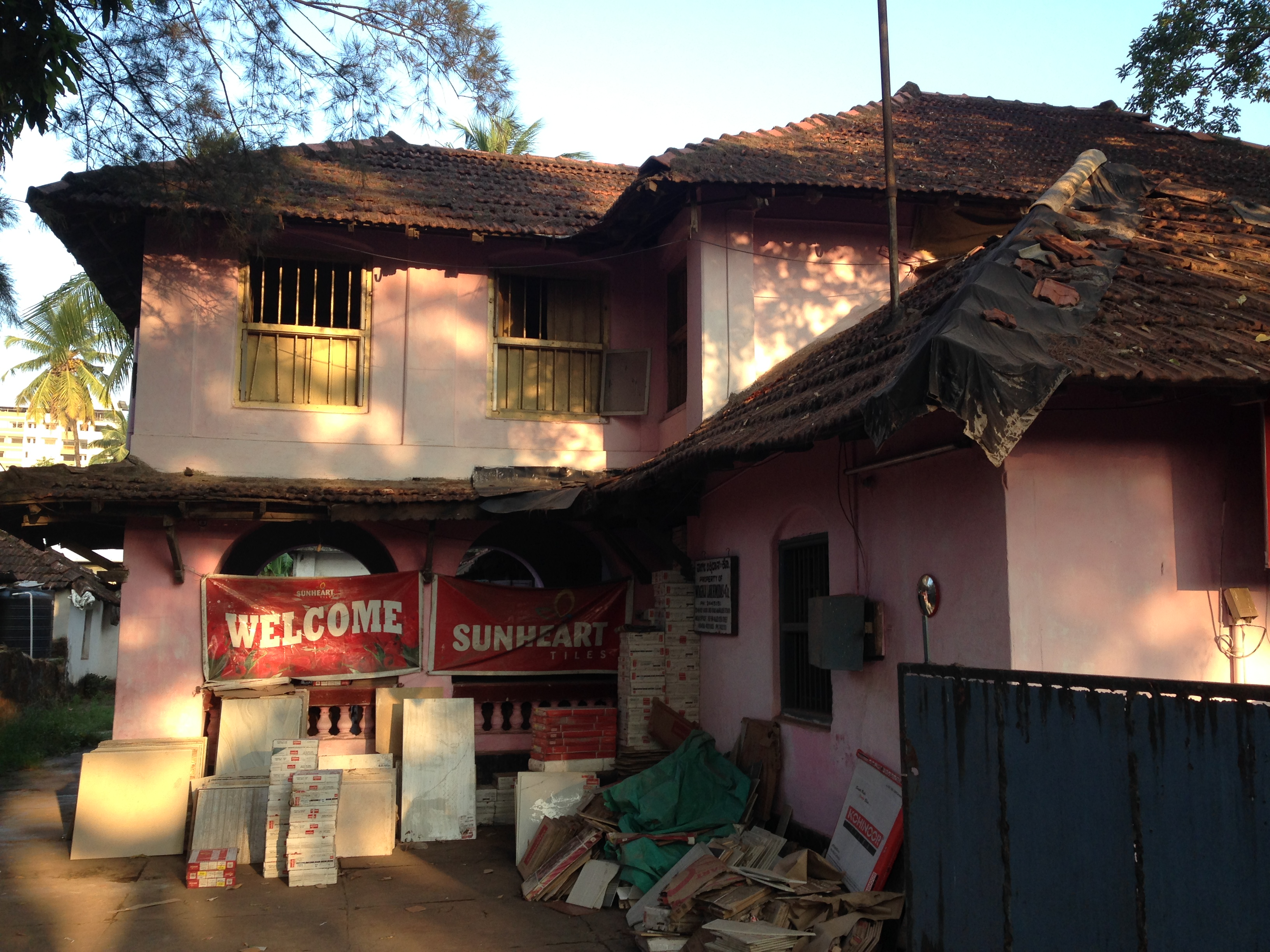
Former mansion of Hoige Koragappa on Goods-Shed road, Bunder, Mangalore where Shri Narayana Guru and Bhagawan Nityananda visited him.

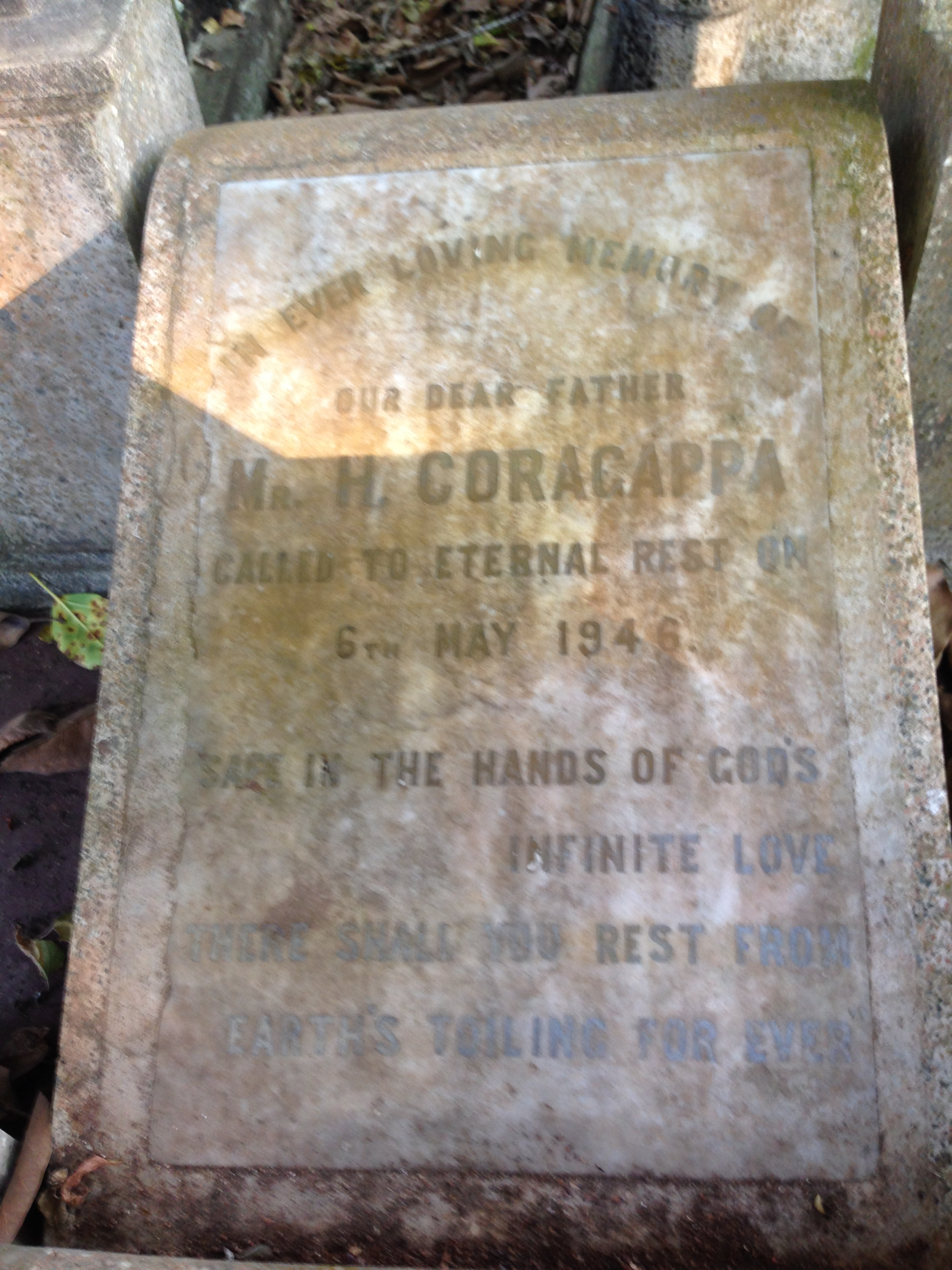
Plaque on the samadhi of Hoige Koragappa at Gori Gudde, Attawar, Mangalore. Shri Koragappa was the prime mover and builder of the Gokarnanatheshwara temple.

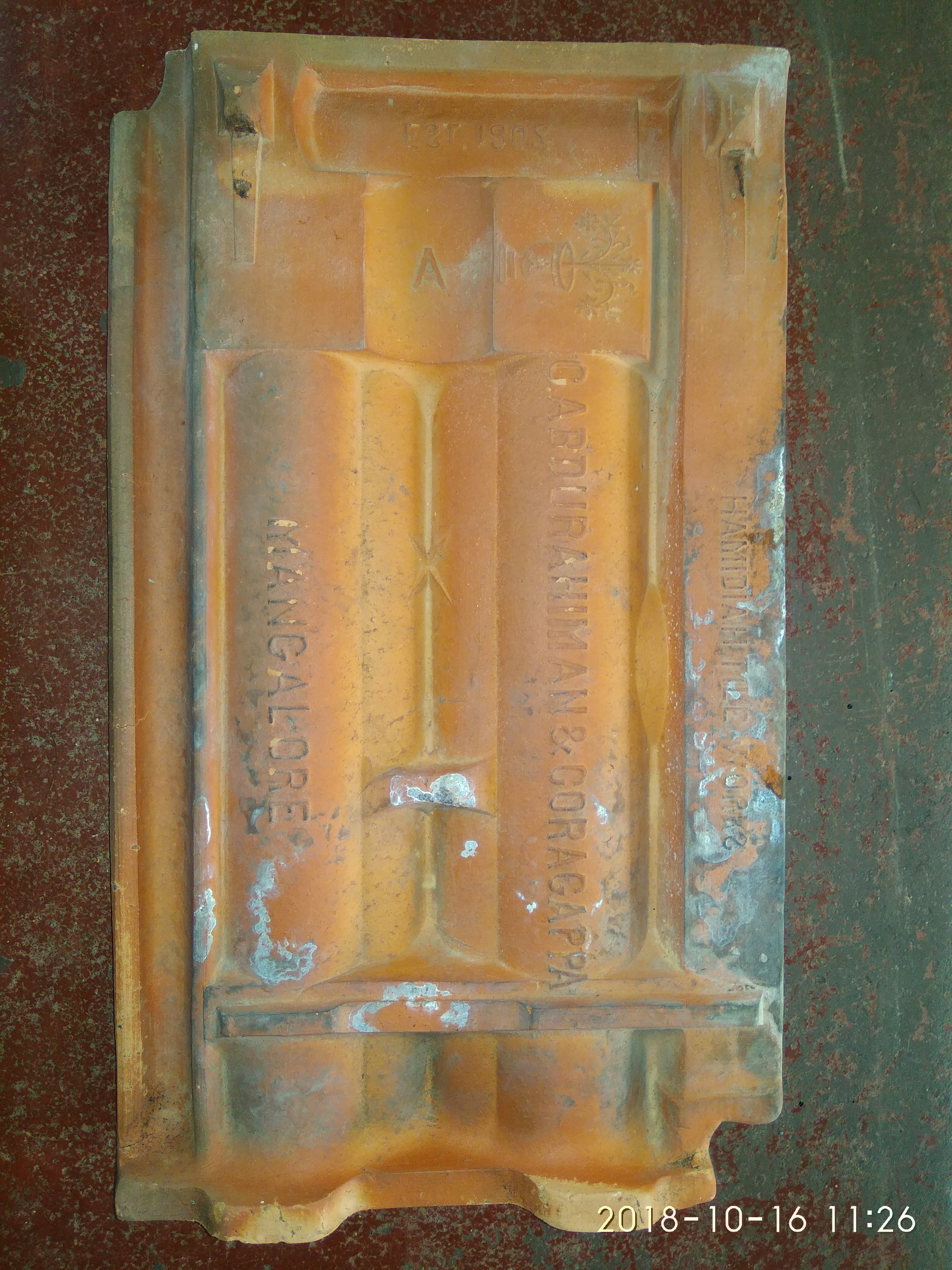
A Mangalore Tile from Adhyaksha Koragappa's Tile factory

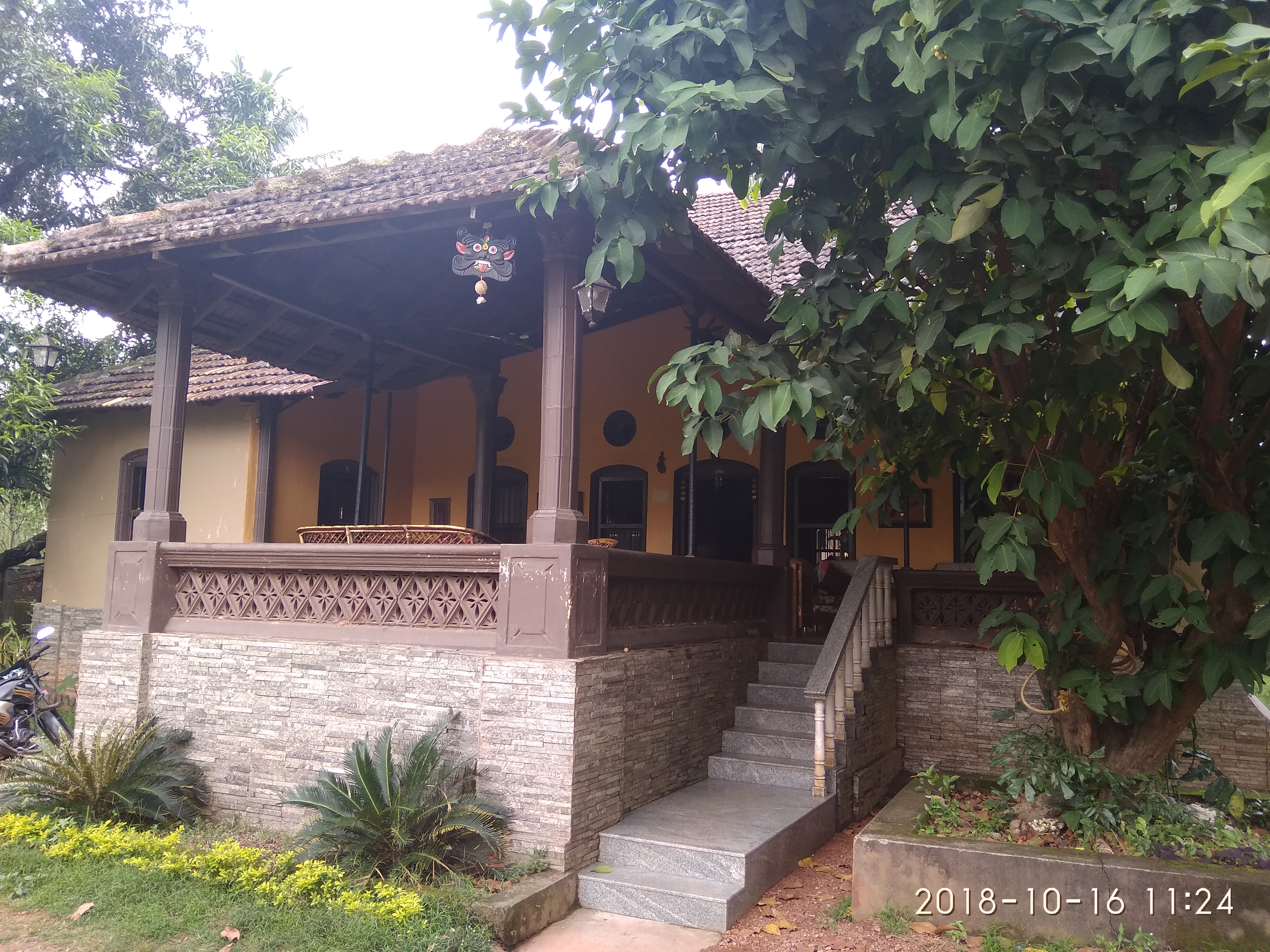
One of the many Guthu Manes (prestige houses - around 100 years old or more) of Adhyaksha Koragappa still stands tall in Mulihithilu, Mangalore

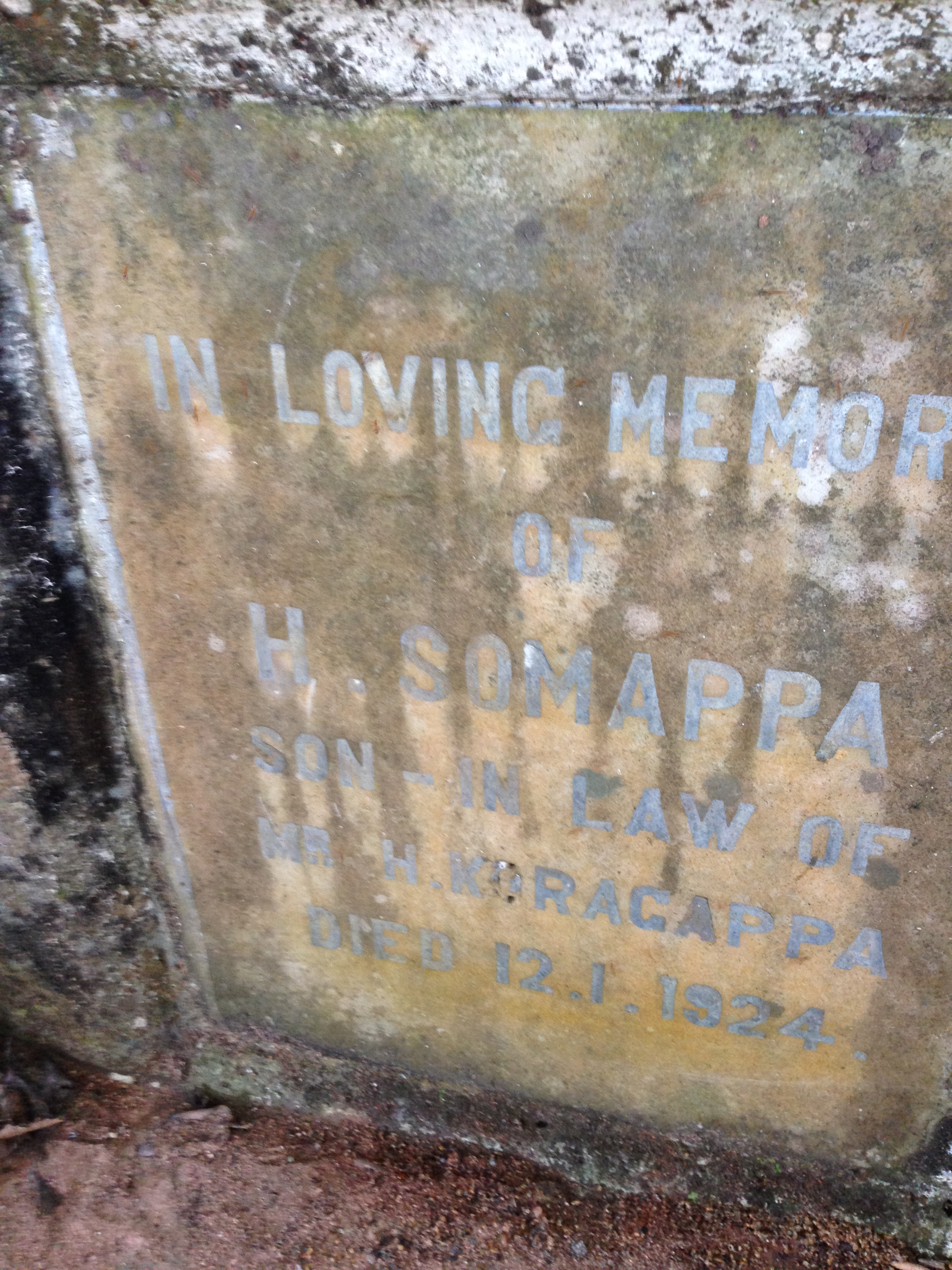
Plaque on the samadhi of H. Somappa, son-in-law of H. Koragappa at Gori Gudde, Attavar, Mangalore. Shri Koragappa went to Shri Narayana Guru in part to get his blessings for the recovery of his son-in-law from a serious illness.

== See also ==
- Temples built by Narayan Guru
- Mangalore Dasara
