= Mangaluru Dasara =

Annual festival in Mangalore, India

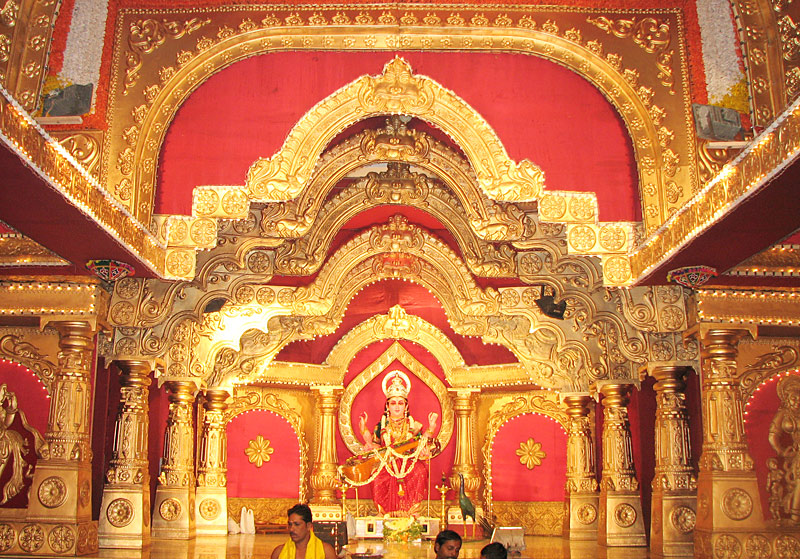
Sharada, Primary deity worshipped in Shri Gokarnanatheshwara Temple during dasara

The Mangaluru Dasara (Tulu: Marnemi, Konkani: Mannami), is a festival in the Indian city of Mangaluru organized by Acharya Mutt and was started by B.R.Karkera. It is also referred as Navarathri Festival, Vijayadashami. The tiger dance, lion dance and bear dance are the main attractions. The city is decorated with lights for the span of 10 days of the occasion.

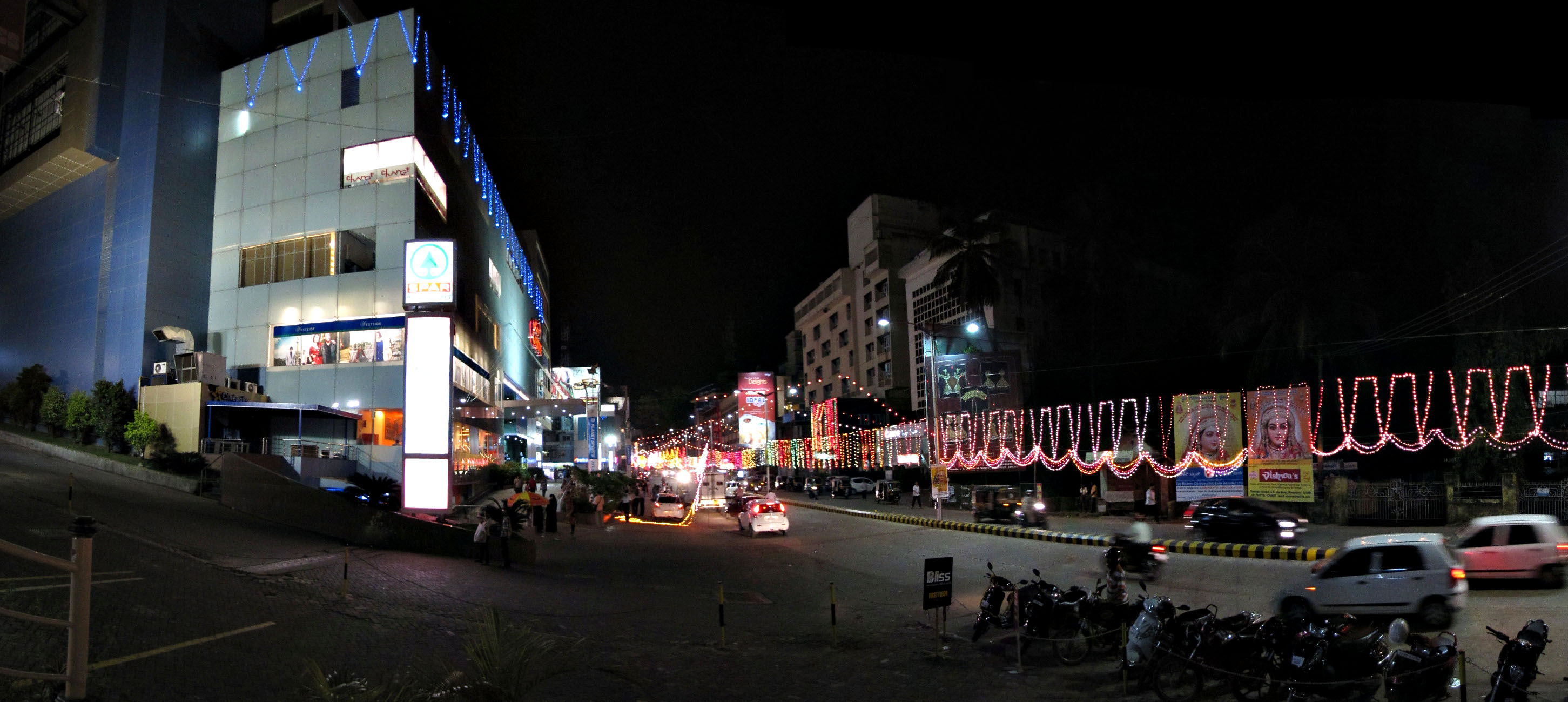
K.S. Rao Road during Dasara

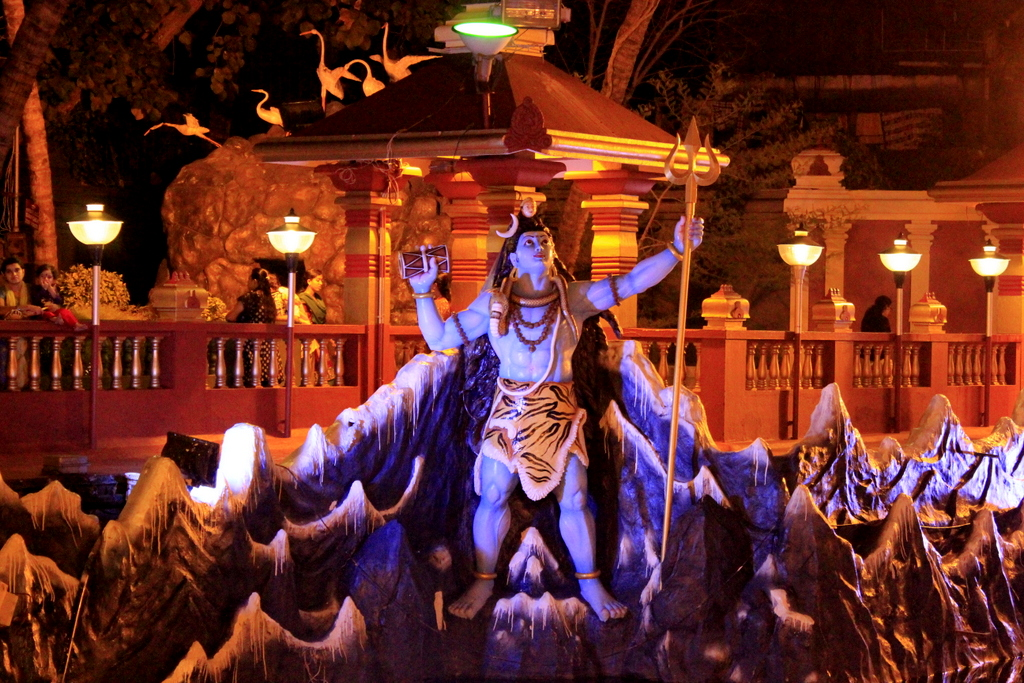
Gangavatharana, Kudroli

The hundred year anniversary celebration in 2012 was the center of attraction during the Navrathri festival. Navrathri and Shivarathri are the two big festivals celebrated at Gokarnanatheshwara Temple.

== Pilinalike ==
Royal Pilinalike (Tulu: Pili Yesa, Kannada: Hulivesha) is a folk dance performed during Dasara. Typically young males form troops of five to ten. They are painted and costumed like tigers and use a band with two or three drummers. The band called thaase in Tulu. This troop is accompanied by the manager of the group. These troops will be roaming the streets of their towns, with the accompanying drum beats of their bands. They stop at homes and businesses or on the roadsides to perform for about ten minutes after which they collect money from the people who have observed their performance. The Pilinalike is performed to honor the goddess Sharada, whose favoured animal is the tiger.

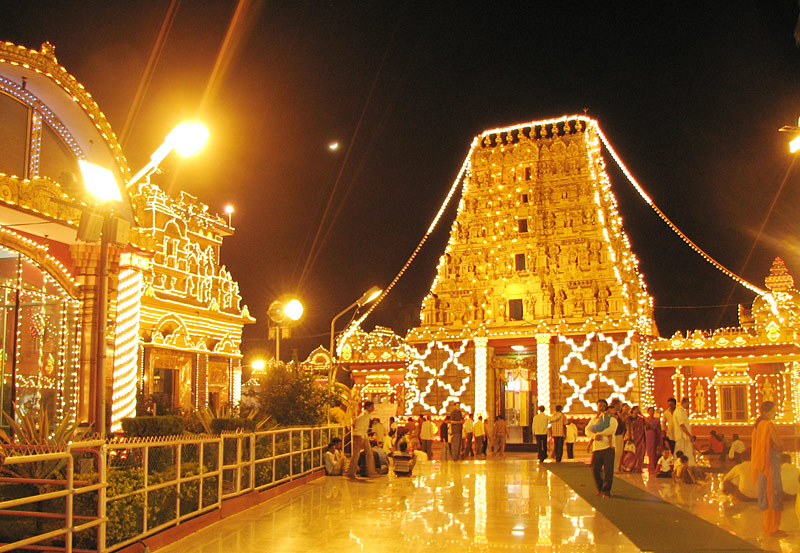
Gokarnanatheshwara Temple during Navaratri

== Dasara mūrtis in Gokarnanatheshwara Temple ==
During Navaratri various murtis along with Sharada Devi will be installed by the priests at Swarna Kalamantapa amidst chanting of hymns and performance of Vedic rituals.^{[2]} Throughout all nine days of celebrations pūjas will be performed venerating the decorated mūrti of Sharada Devi along with those of Mahaganapati and Navadurgas.

- Sharada Devi
- Mahaganapati
- Adi Shakti
- Navadurgas
  1. Shailaputri
  2. Brahmacharini
  3. Chandraghanta
  4. Kushmandaini
  5. Skandamata
  6. Katyayini
  7. Kaalratri
  8. Mahagauri
  9. Siddhidatri

The Kudroli temple trust keeps the Gangavatharana (jet of holy water representing the sacred Ganges) flowing continuously from Lord Shiva's crown throughout all 9 days of Navratri. This depiction consists of four colorful mūrtis of Lord Shiva 13 feet high with the water jet to rush up to 100 feet towards the sky. As the jets of water from all four sides reach their pinnacle they form the shape of a Shivalingam.

== The Grand Procession ==
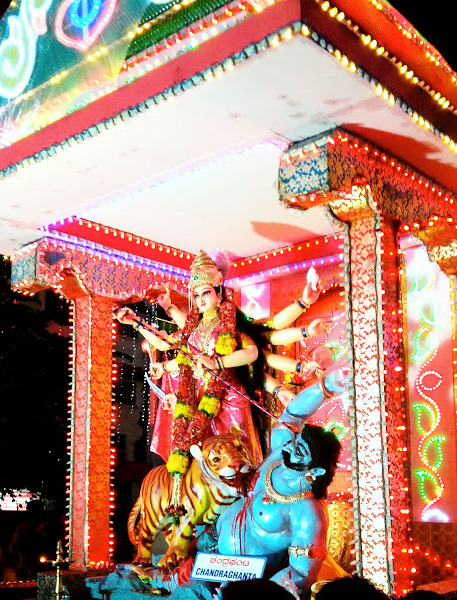
Idol of Chandraghanta, one of the nine forms of goddess Parvati on tableaux during the procession.

The procession begins from the Kudroli Shree Gokarnanatheshwara Temple in the evening of Vijaya Dashami and will end at the same venue early morning Next day with the immersion of the idols at the Pushkarini pond inside the temple complex. Idols of Navadurgas along with Mahaganapathi and Sharada are carried in the procession, augmented by flowers, decorative umbrellas, tableaux, bands, chende and traditional dances, folk dances, Yakshagana characters, Dollu Kunitha, gombe (dolls), Pilinalike (Huli vesha) and other traditional art forms. The procession passes through the main roads of the city including Kudroli, Mannagudda, Ladyhill, Lalbagh, K S Rao road, Hampanakatta, Car Street and Alake.

Though the primary location of Mangalore Dasara is Kudroli Shri Gokarnanatheshwara Temple, Mangalore Dasara can also be referred to as the group of celebrations/events organized by temples such as Mangaladevi Temple, Sri Venkatramana Temple, and Sri Jodumutt. There are various Sharada Pooja committees which organise Sharada Poojas.

=== Mangaladevi Dasara ===
Chariot of Mangaladevi Temple

Mangaladevi, Bolar attracts devotees all over India to celebrate the Dasara festival. Mangalore got its name from Mangaladevi. Mangaladevi temple arranges cultural programmes such as folk, music, drama, plays on various themes, ballets and devotional songs. On the ninth day, known as mahanavami, devotees participate in the Rathotsava (car festival). The decorated goddess is mounted on the grand chariot and pulled with thick ropes. The Rathothsava is filled with various deities and many tableaux decorated with colorful lights. The procession reaches Marnamikatta where the goddess is worshipped.

=== Mangalore Sharadotsava ===
Popularly known as "Mangalore Sharadotsava" or "Sharada Mahotsava" is a 6-7 days celebration during the Navaratri in Sri Venkatramana Temple, Car Street. Idol of Goddess Sharada is installed at Acharya Mutt premises of Sri Venkataramana Temple, Car Street. The idol is earlier brought to the Mutt premises in a grand procession from "The Great Darbar Beedi Works", Bunder. The festivities conclude with a colourful and grand procession carrying the idol of Goddess Sharada. It would be taken out on the main streets of the city where thousands of people gather on either sides of the streets to witness the procession. The idol will be immersed at the Mahamaya Temple lake during the wee hours upon the culmination of the procession.
