= Kudroli =

Locality in Mangalore, Karnataka, India

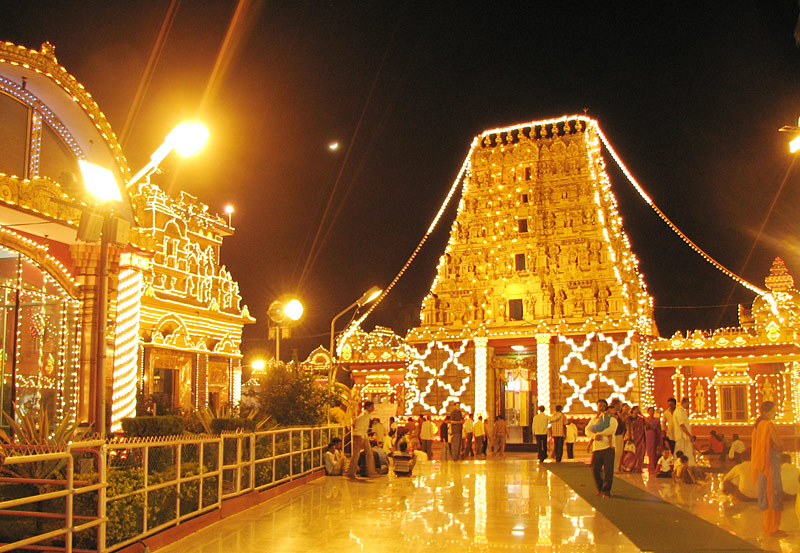
Dasara decorations at Kudroli Temple

Kudroli is a locality in the city of Mangalore, Karnataka, India. Kudroli is just 2 km from the heart of the city.

== History ==
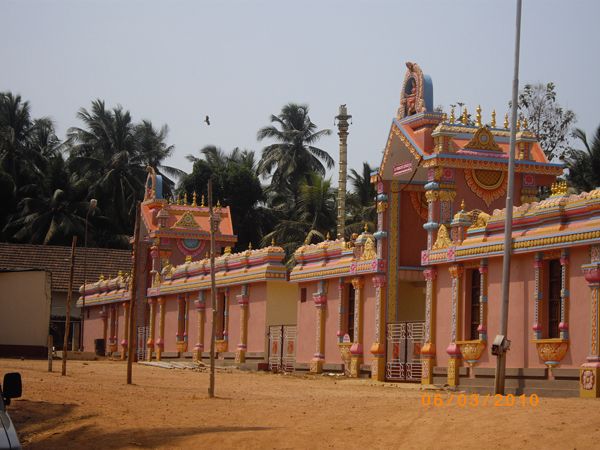
Bhagavathi Temple, Kudroli

Kudroli was formerly known as Kudre-halli where Tippu Sultan, the ruler of Mysore, army used to have Horses stables and grazing land, is one of the oldest and well-known localities of Mangalore City located on the Western Coastal belt of Karnataka, India . Since it is the oldest locality pre-dominated by Muslim inhabitants it has become an Islamic learning center of the city which also hosts various religious functions and the festivities. It is also a historic place as the ruler, Tippu Sultan has his fort just a couple of kilometers away known as Sultan Battery. Kudroli is also famous for Gokarnatheshwara Temple. This temple was built by a great devotee (of lord Shiva) and businessman called H. Coragappa in the year 1912. Coragappa who belonged to the Billava (traditionally a warrior caste) family built the temple at a place which was believed to be the graze land for the horses during the rule of Tipu Sultan, hence the name kudrehalli (kudre meaning horse), which transformed into Kudroli over time.

== See also ==
- Gokarnanatheshwara Temple
- Mangalore Dasara
