= Karnad Sadashiva Rao =

Indian politician

- Born: 1881; Mangalore, Madras Presidency, British India
- Died: 9 January 1937 (aged 55–56); Bombay, Bombay Presidency, British India
- Education: Madras Presidency College
- Known for: Indian independence movement
- Movement: Indian National Congress
- Parent(s): Ramachandra Rao (father); Radhabai (mother)

Karnad Sadashiva Rao was an Indian freedom fighter from what is now Karnataka, India. Rao was born to a wealthy south Indian family in 1881. He studied at Presidency College in Madras and also studied law in Mumbai.

Rao became involved in the Indian independence movement. He founded Mahila Sabha to help widows and poor women. By 1919, he was fully involved in the Indian independence movement, being one of the first from what is now Karnataka to volunteer for Gandhi's Satyagraha movement. He was also one of the key members of the Congress Party and was responsible for expanding the party in what is now Karnataka.

Rao spent all of his wealth in service of the independence movement and for helping the poor. He attended the Faizpur Congress Session in December 1936. A penniless Sadashiva Rao stayed in a leaky hut, and caught cold and fever. Despite this, Rao travelled to Mumbai without telling anyone of his condition. He died shortly afterwards on 9 January 1937. Rao died without a single penny, without having money to even perform his last rites.

Sadashivanagar in Bangalore was named after Karnad Sadashiva Rao in 1960.

Karnad Sadashiva Rao Road or popularly known as KS Rao Road in Mangalore is named after Karnad Sadashiva Rao.
