= K. S. Rao Road =

Road in India

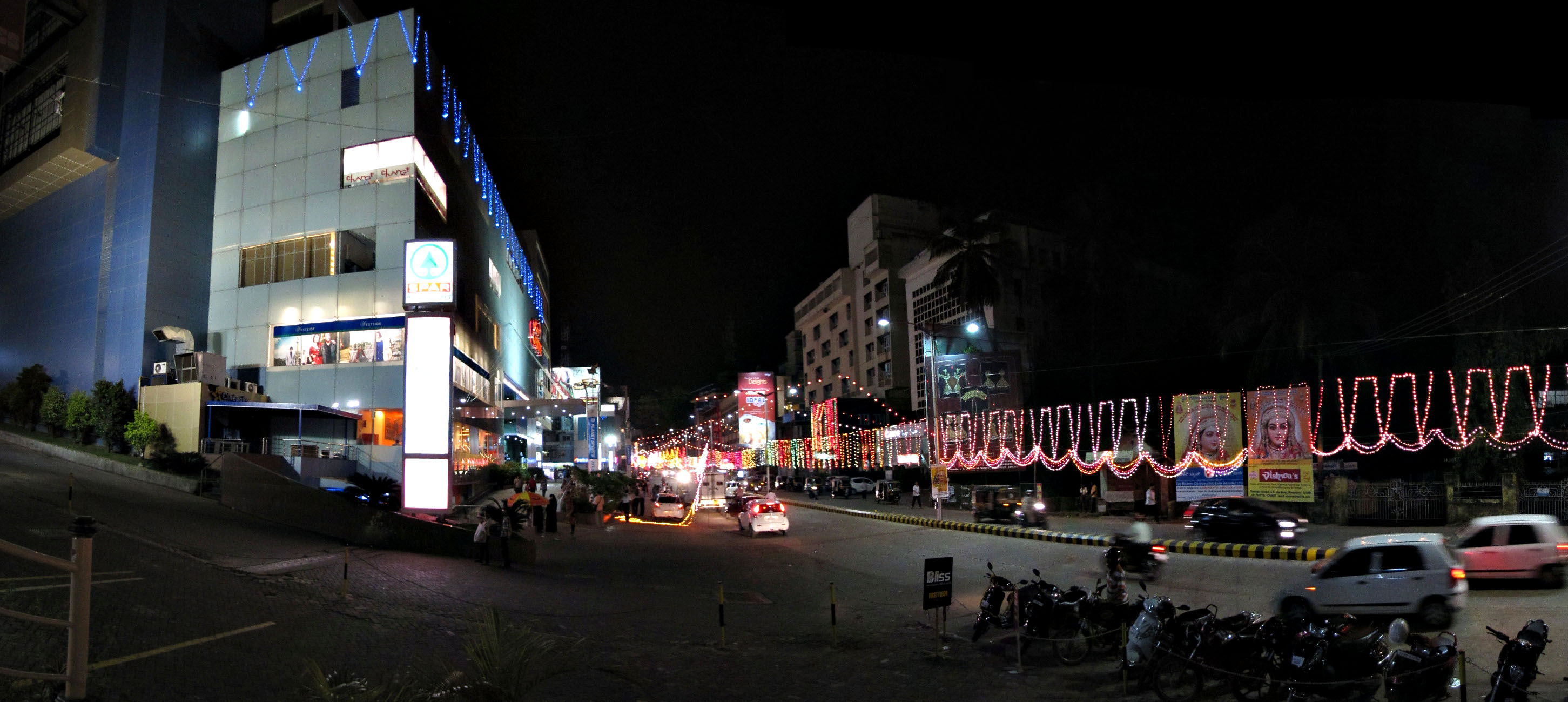
K S Rao Road near City Centre Mall decorated during Mangaluru Dasara

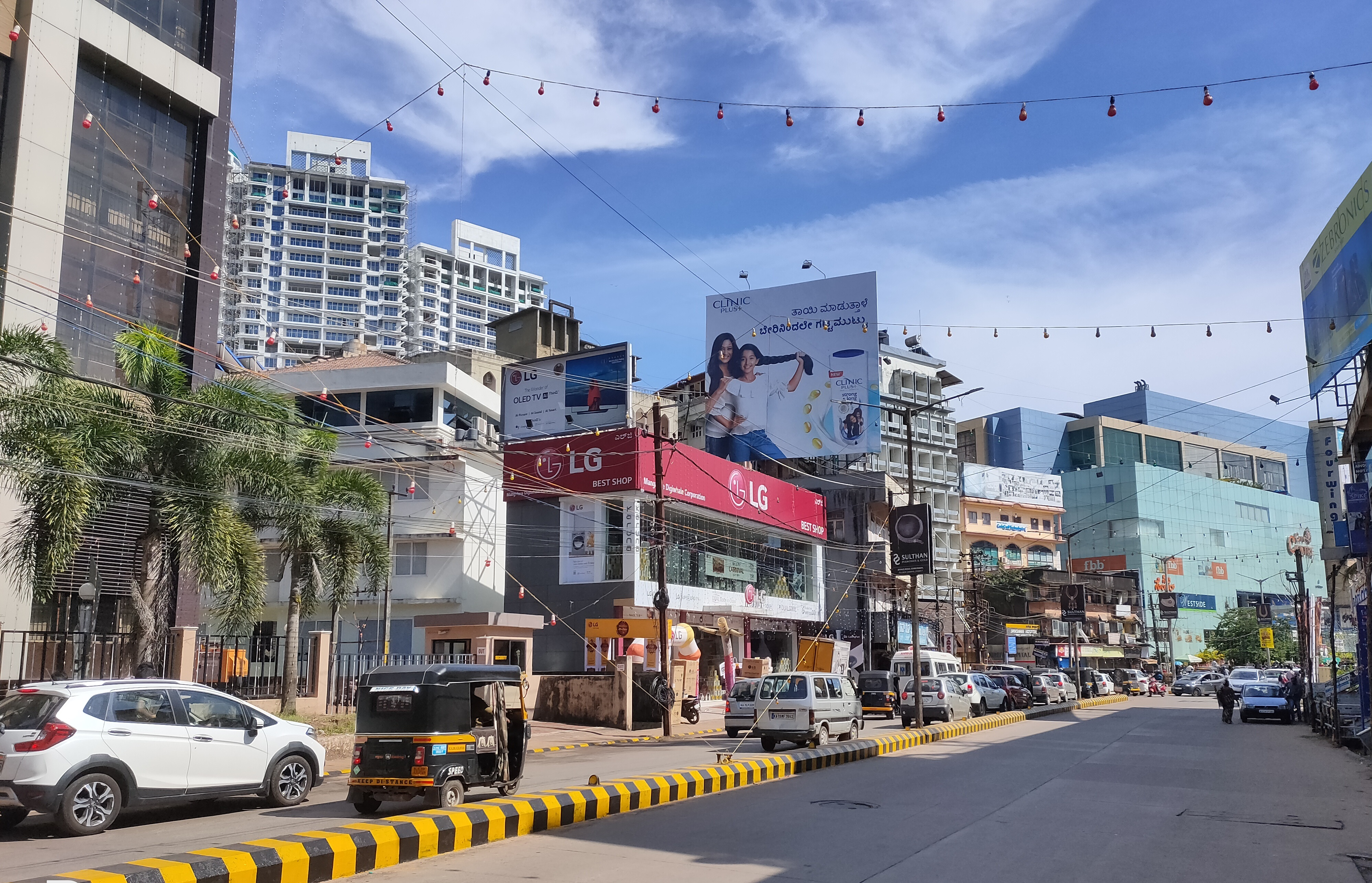
A view of KS Rao Road, Mangaluru

Karnad Sadashiva Rao Road, abbreviated as K S Rao Road, is a popular arterial road in Mangaluru, India. It runs from PVS Circle at one end to Hampankatta on the other where it joins Maidan Road near Mangaluru Central Railway Station. This road is named after the Indian freedom fighter Karnad Sadashiva Rao.

Many commercial buildings and shopping malls are situated adjacent to this road.

== Notable buildings ==
- City Centre Mall

== See also ==
- Mahatma Gandhi Road (Mangaluru)
- Pilikula Nisargadhama
- Kadri Park
- Tagore Park
- St. Aloysius Chapel
