= Ullal–Portuguese conflicts =

16th century Indian military conflict

- Part of Portuguese presence in Asia
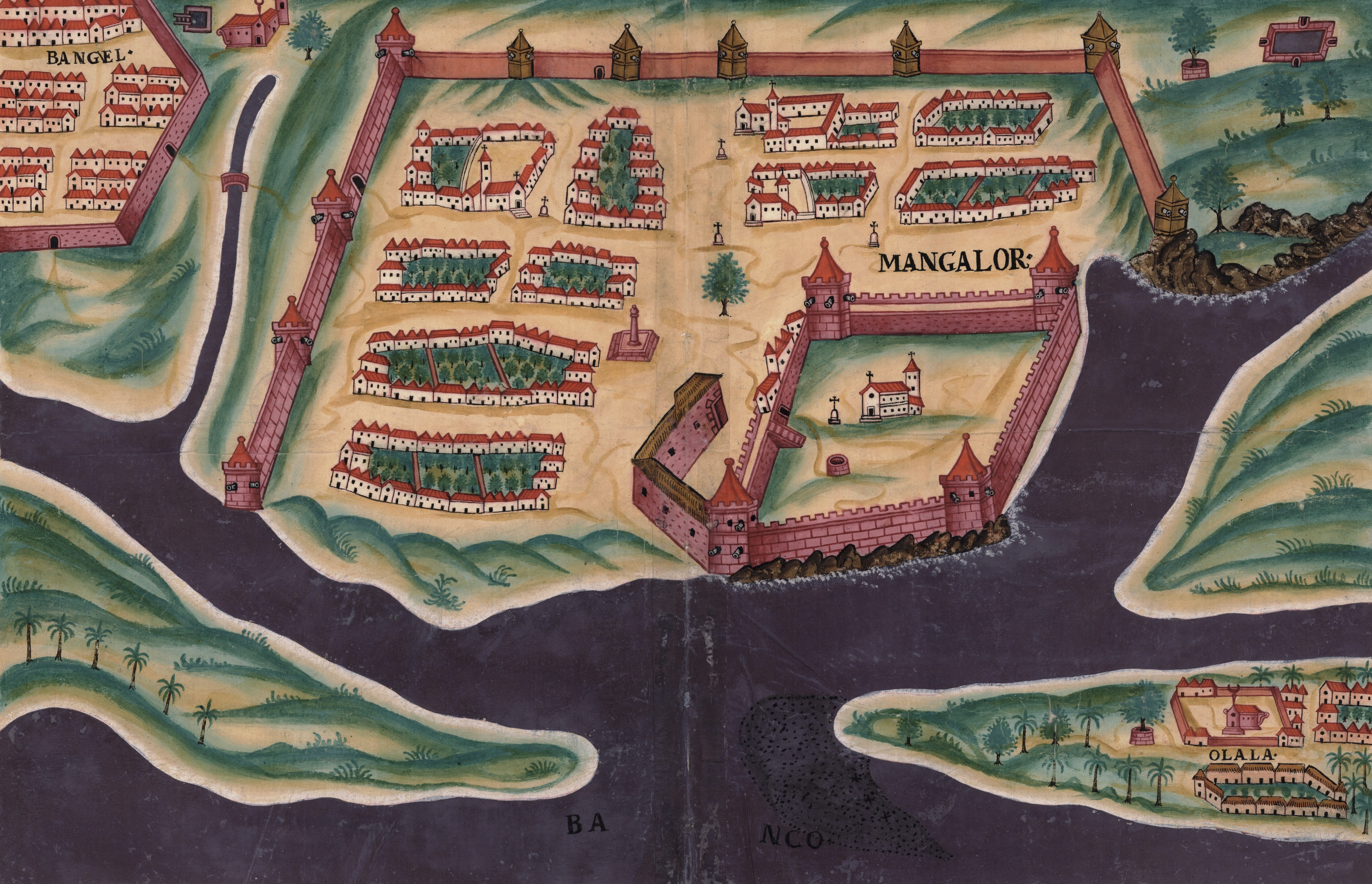
- Portuguese fort of Mangalore, by Pedro Barreto de Resende (1635)
| Date | c. 1555 or 1558 – 1618 |
| Location | Kanara coast, India |

Belligerents
| (Kingdom of Portugal) Portuguese Empire; Banga kingdom | Kingdom of Ullal; Zamorin of Calicut; Ahmadnagar Sultanate; Sultanate of Bijapur; Gerusoppa; Keladi kingdom |

Commanders and leaders
| (Kingdom of Portugal) D. Álvaro da Silveira (Kingdom of Portugal) D. António de Noronha (Kingdom of Portugal) João Peixoto † (Kingdom of Portugal) D. Francisco de Mascarenhas; Thome de Souza; Lakshmapparasa IV | Rani Abbakka I (POW); King of Ullal (surrendered); Rani Abbakka II; Kutty Pokar Markar †; Venkatappa Nayaka |

The Ullal–Portuguese conflicts were a series of military engagements fought intermittently between the Portuguese Empire and the Chowta dynasty of Ullal from either 1555 or 1558 to 1618 over trade and tribute.

== Background ==
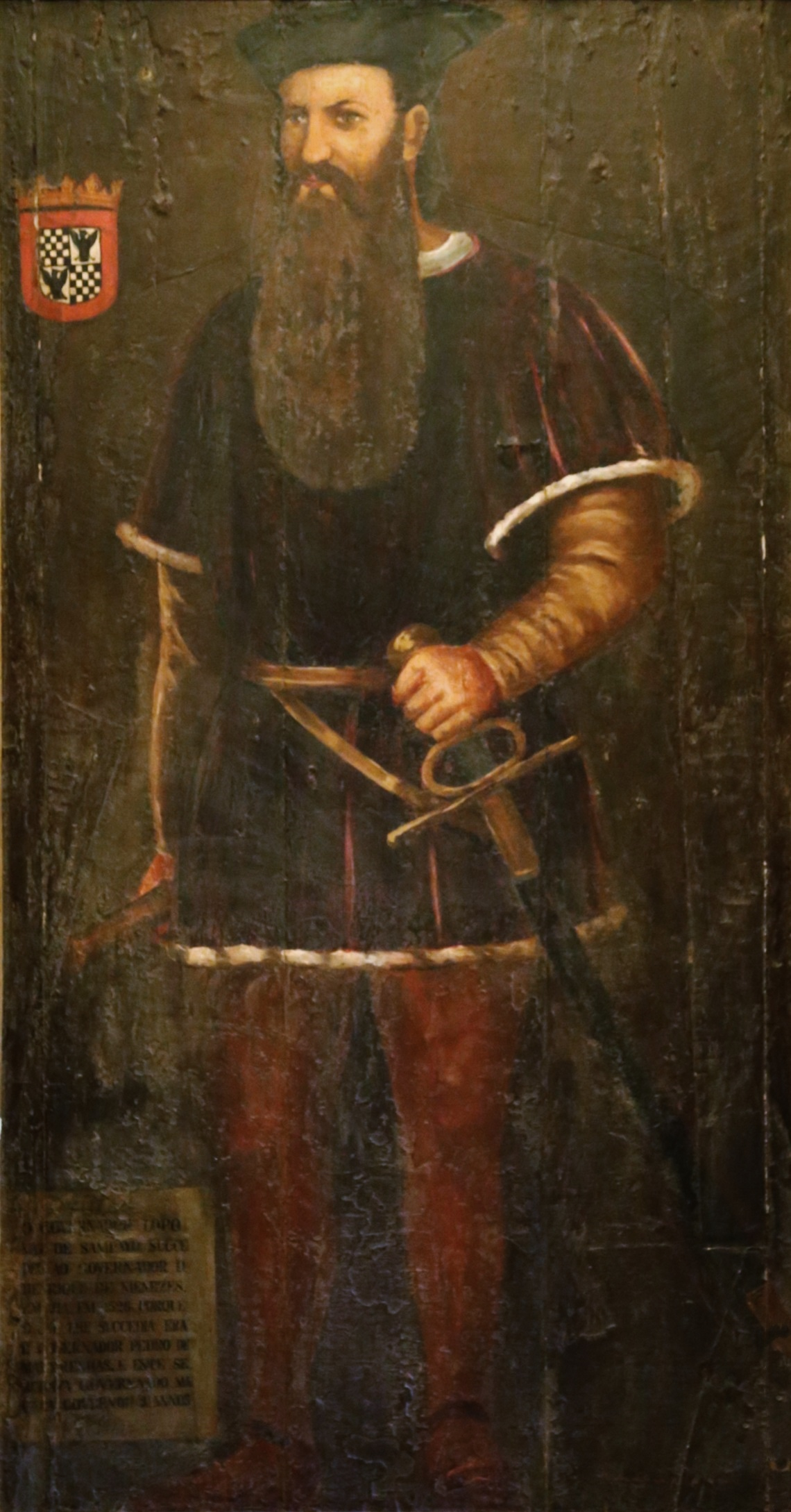
Lopo Vaz de Sampaio, Viceroy of Portuguese India, established Portuguese factories in Mangalore in 1526.

The Portuguese first attacked and annexed the port of Mangalore in 1525, with looting and pillaging continuing until 1531. Aware of the threat, Queen Rani Abbakka I of Ullal initiated defensive preparations to protect her kingdom, most notably constructing a powerful fort in Ullal. Portuguese records from 1555 refer to her as "Bukkorani of Ballala".

Seeking Abbakka's lucrative trade, the Portuguese demanded tributes and taxes. For centuries, Ullal's ships had traded spices and fabrics with the Middle East through an alliance with the Zamorin of Calicut, and the Queen chose to defy the Portuguese embargo. When the Portuguese captured an Ullal trading ship mid-sea, an angered Abbakka attacked the Portuguese fort and factory in Mangalore. Infuriated by her defiance, the Portuguese began a series of repeated attacks against Ullal.

== Rani Abbakka I ==
=== 1555 ===
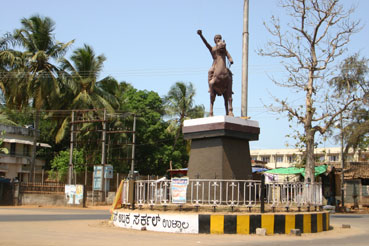
Statue of Queen Rani Abbakka I in Ullal

According to a contemporary Portuguese source, the first battle between the Portuguese and Abbakka took place in 1555, when the Portuguese dispatched Admiral Dom Álvaro da Silveira with 21 warships against the Queen after her refusal to pay a trade tribute. Silveira destroyed many towns, ships, and "everything which came in his way". In response, Abbakka formed several alliances with neighboring coastal states, including the Zamorin. Her forces successfully repelled the Portuguese, ending the war in a truce. Under its terms, Abbakka was to hand over a portion of her trade revenue to the Portuguese.

Historian K. G. Vasantha Madhava, however, notes that there is no corroborative evidence substantiating this event.

=== 1558 ===
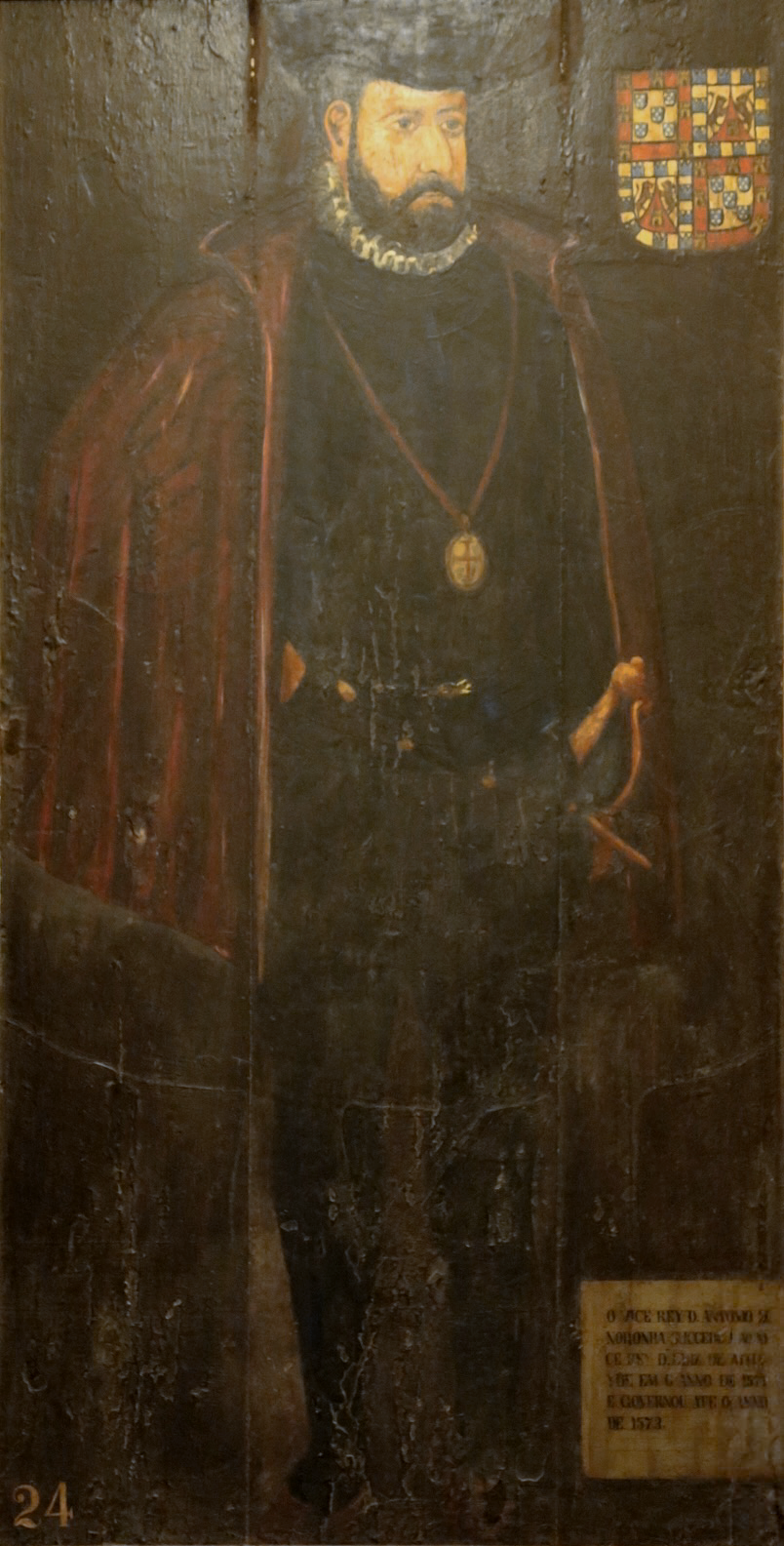
Portrait of D. António de Noronha

In 1558, triggered by Abbakka's cessation of tributes and her alliance with the Zamorin that allowed Ullal to trade outside India without the cartaz, the Portuguese attacked and "reduced Mangalore to ashes". The campaign, led by the future Viceroy of Portuguese India, D. António de Noronha, saw thousands put to death, temples looted, and both ships and the city ultimately burned.

=== 1567 ===
The decline of the dominant Vijayanagara Empire after 1565 emboldened the Portuguese to carry out further attacks on the coastal states.

In 1567, General João Peixoto was dispatched by the Portuguese Viceroy with a fleet of 8 ships. He breached the city of Ullal and entered the royal court. The Queen managed to escape and launched a night attack with 6,000 soldiers, resulting in the death of General Peixoto and 70 Portuguese soldiers. The remaining Portuguese forces retreated to their ships.

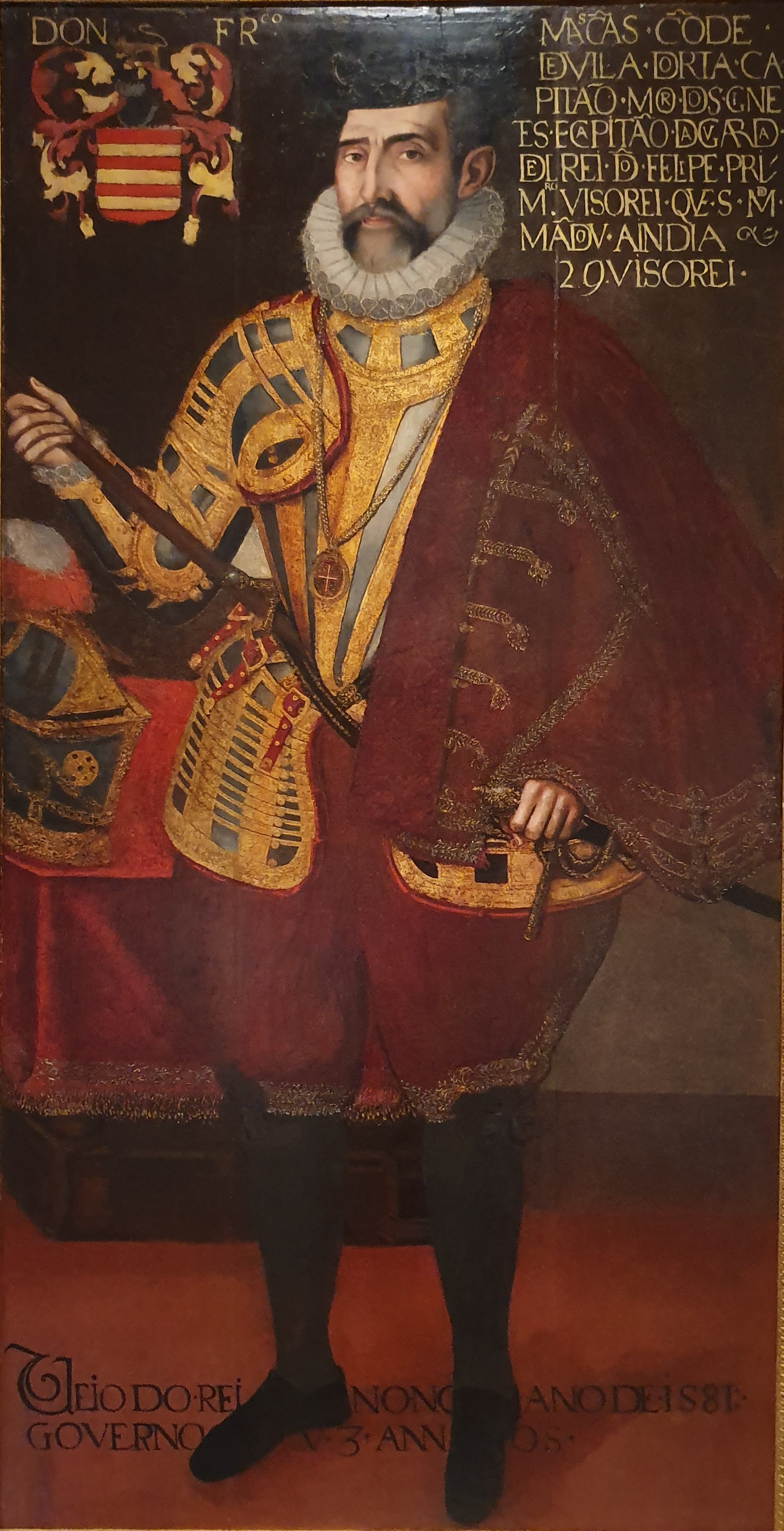
Portrait of D. Francisco de Mascarenhas

That same year, Dom Francisco de Mascarenhas was dispatched to Ullal with 27 vessels, preceded by João Peixoto, to enforce the tribute payment. The viceroy followed Mascarenhas with seven galleys, five smaller vessels, and roughly 3,000 soldiers, aiming to erect a fort in Mangalore and bring the Queen into submission.

The fleet anchored at Mangalore and Ullal, and six battalions landed on 4 January 1567. That night, while the Portuguese were dining in their camp and caught off guard, the Ullal sallied forth with 500 men, followed by another 1,500. They fell upon the Portuguese so suddenly and furiously that they were left "helpless and thrown into great disorder". Dom Francisco de Mascarenhas, who held an advanced post, bore the brunt of the attack, and though he fought bravely, he lost several men. He was finally relieved by Dom Luiz de Almeida, and the Ullal were driven off.

On the eve of the Epiphany, the Portuguese assaulted the city. After forcing their way inside, they set it on fire and cut down its grove of palm trees, forcing the Queen to flee to the mountains. 500 Ullal were killed, the Portuguese lost 40 troops. The Viceroy then laid the foundations of the fortress, naming it São Sebastian because the first stone was laid on that Saint's day, and also to honor the reigning King of Portugal. By March, the fortress and surrounding buildings were completed. The Viceroy handed command over to his brother-in-law, Antonio Pereira, leaving behind a garrison of 300 men and ammunition. Later, during the administration of Dom Luís de Ataíde, the Queen sued for peace by agreeing to an additional tribute and an immediate payment.

=== 1569–1588 ===
The historic bonhomie between the Chowta rulers of Ullal and the Bangas of Bangadi (Nandavara) deteriorated during the reign of Rani Abbakka I, a division the Portuguese exploited. In 1567, the Portuguese formed an alliance with the Banga ruler, Veera Narasimha Lakshmapparasa. This alliance fostered intense rivalry and skirmishes between the Chowtas and the Bangas, prompting the Viceroy Dom Luís de Ataíde to intervene in 1569 to settle the dispute.

In 1570, Abbakka formed a major strategic alliance with the Sultan of Bijapur, the Sultan of Ahmadnagar, the Zamorin of Calicut and Rani Chennabhairadevi of Gerusoppa to establish a united front against Portugal. Kutty Pokar Markar, a general of the Zamorin, fought alongside Ullal and destroyed the Portuguese fort at Mangalore, which they had recaptured by 1569, as well as those of Kundapur, though he was subsequently killed by the Portuguese during his return.

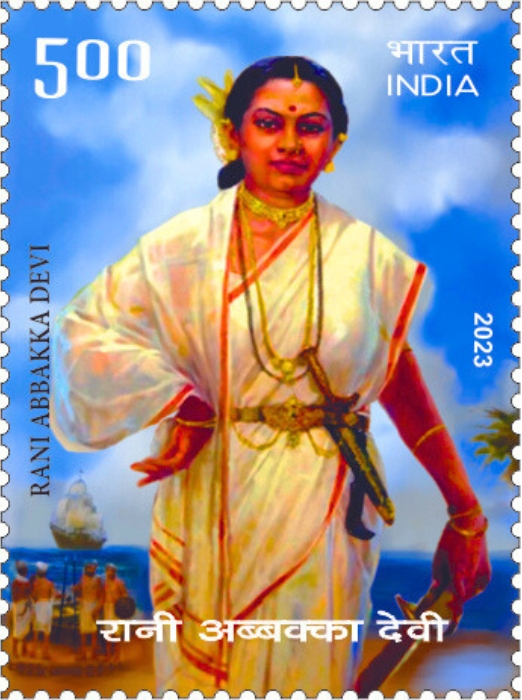
Rani Abbakka I on a 2023 stamp of India

In 1584 (or 1588), the Portuguese dispatched 3,000 troops supported by a large armada, for a predawn assault on Ullal. Returning from a visit to her family temple, Abbakka was caught unprepared but mounted a counteroffensive, leading her troops into battle and setting several Portuguese ships on fire. During the battle, Abbakka was severely wounded, and, with the aid of a few bribed chieftains, the Portuguese captured the queen, who subsequently died in captivity.

By 1589, Portuguese records from that year already mention a king of Ullal, confirming the definitive end of her rule.

== King of Ullal ==
The new ruler of Ullal, whose name is unknown, quickly clashed with the Bangas, escalating into war. Though the King of Ullal initially gained the upper hand, the Portuguese intervened on behalf of the Bangas, dispatching Major Thome de Souza on 1 December 1589 with 33 ships to Mangalore to make peace. When the King failed to keep his promise to dismantle the fort, Souza declared war. The Portuguese forces inflicted heavy casualties, forcing the King to accept their terms.

== Rani Abbakka II ==
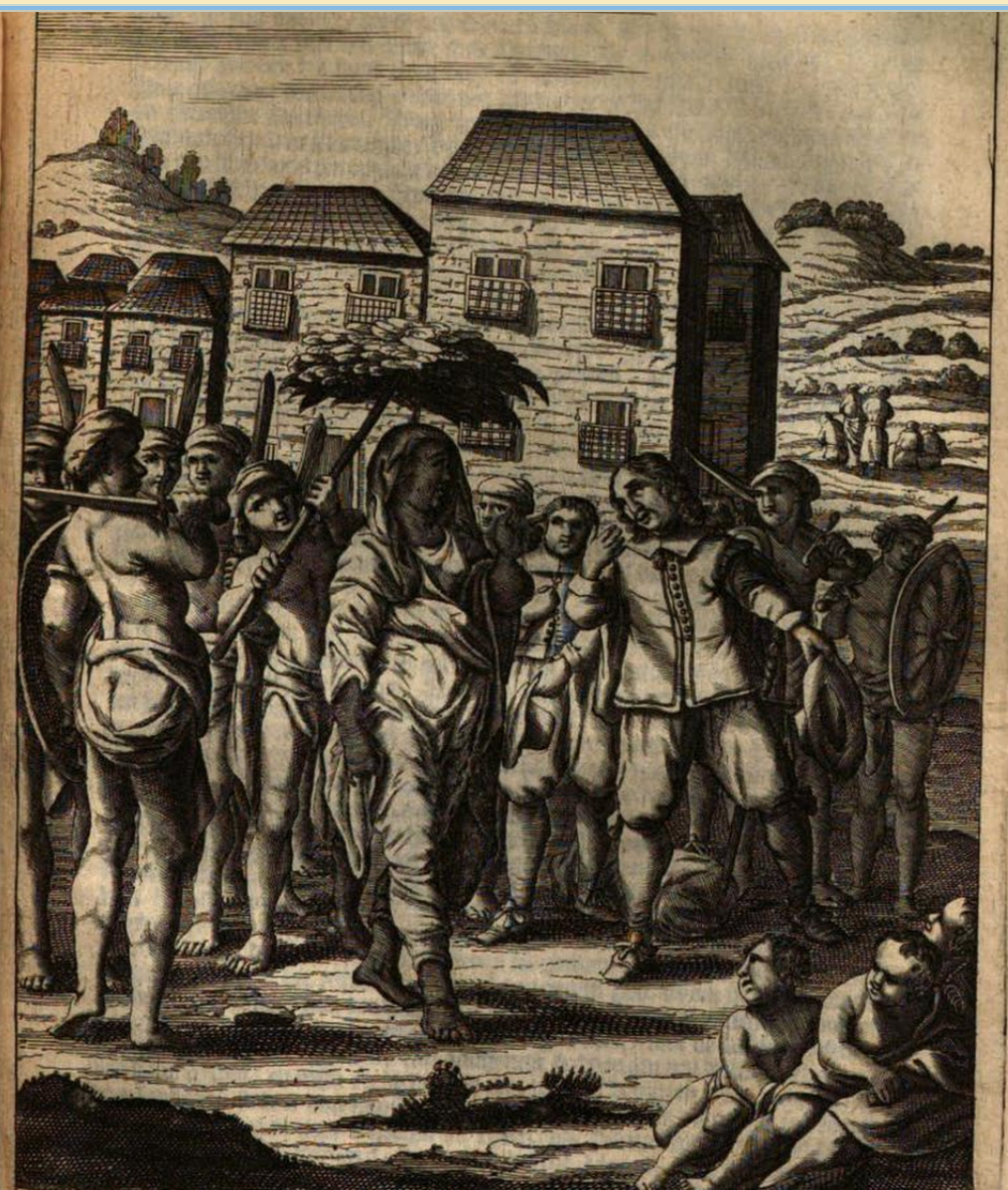
Italian traveler Pietro Della Valle meets Queen Rani Abbakka II

Rani Abbakka II ascended the throne of the Chowta dynasty around 1594. Although Abbakka I's daughter, Thirumaladevi, was the rightful successor, a political vacuum resulted in her sister taking over. Upon assuming power, Abbakka II ceased all tribute payments to Portugal and revoked all their trade concessions in Ullal. She also fortified her stronghold in Ullal, maintaining a standing army of 1,100 soldiers.

The presence of the fort at Ullal remained "irksome" for the Portuguese. On 1 March 1595, the King of Portugal instructed the Viceroy that no peace treaty should be concluded without a provision for its destruction. Because the Queen was reluctant, the Viceroy dispatched Dom A. Azevedo to Ullal, who destroyed the fort.

After a series of disputes between Abbakka II and her estranged husband, Veera Narasimha Lakshmapparasa IV of Bangadi, the two nations declared war on each other. Lakshmapparasa allied with the Portuguese, while Abbakka allied with Venkatappa Nayaka of Keladi.

Upon the request for assistance, the Portuguese formed a military confederacy to back him. This alliance grew to include the Bangas, the Queen of Carnate, the King of Mountain, and later, the King of Ajila. However, the Portuguese decided to help these chiefs in a way that would not disrupt their pepper trade.

In response to a more urgent request by Lakshmapparasa in 1615, the Portuguese provided ten soldiers under the command of Antoneo de Saldanha, along with gunpowder and explosives, in 1617.

Despite Portugal's assistance, Venkatappa Nayaka deployed a formidable army that dismantled the fort of Bangadi, crushed the confederacy, and forced the Banga ruler to flee to Kasargod, reducing it to a tributary state. Simultaneously, the combined forces of Keladi and Abbakka defeated the Portuguese at Mangalore, inflicting severe losses without capturing it. The ensuing treaty concluded the immediate skirmish, allowing Abbakka II to retain her fortifications and her seized fleet, though she had to concede the territory of Bedde (near Moodabidri) to Keladi.

Encouraged by Lakshmapparasa's son-in-law, Kamarasa III, the Portuguese launched another bold assault on the kingdom in 1618. A Portuguese captain, Miranda Anriques, seized one of Abbakka's wealthy ships as it returned from Mecca, and later Ullal was blockaded. The Portuguese then anchored at sea, waiting for an opportunity to strike.

On a pitch-black night, a group of her soldiers boarded their local boats and silently approached the Portuguese warships. At the signal, the soldiers launched hundreds of burning coconut torches onto the fleet. The sails quickly caught fire and the Portuguese ships started burning. Desperate crew members jumped into the sea to escape the fire, only to be killed by Abbakka's waiting soldiers. According to Portuguese sources, 200 of their soldiers were killed, and two warships were sunk, forcing the navy to retreat.

== Aftermath ==
Rani Abbakka II ruled until around 1640, however, little else is known about the rest of her reign or any further skirmishes with the Portuguese. A third Abbakka is thought to have ruled from Moodabidri between 1666 and 1671, and a fourth from 1719 to 1725, though not much is known about them either. Hyder Ali of Mysore later severely subdued the dynasty's power, after which the Chowtas became mere figurehead rulers in the region.

== Bibliography ==
- Sampath, Vikram (26 October 2022). Penguin Random House India Private Limited (ed.). Bravehearts of Bharat. ISBN 9789354928284.
- Danvers, Frederick (1894). The Portuguese in India: A.D. 1481-1571. W.H. Allen & Company.
- Madhava, K. G. V. (2016). Political History Of Kanara 1565-1763 AD (Mainly Based On Inscriptions).
