= Netravati Bridge =

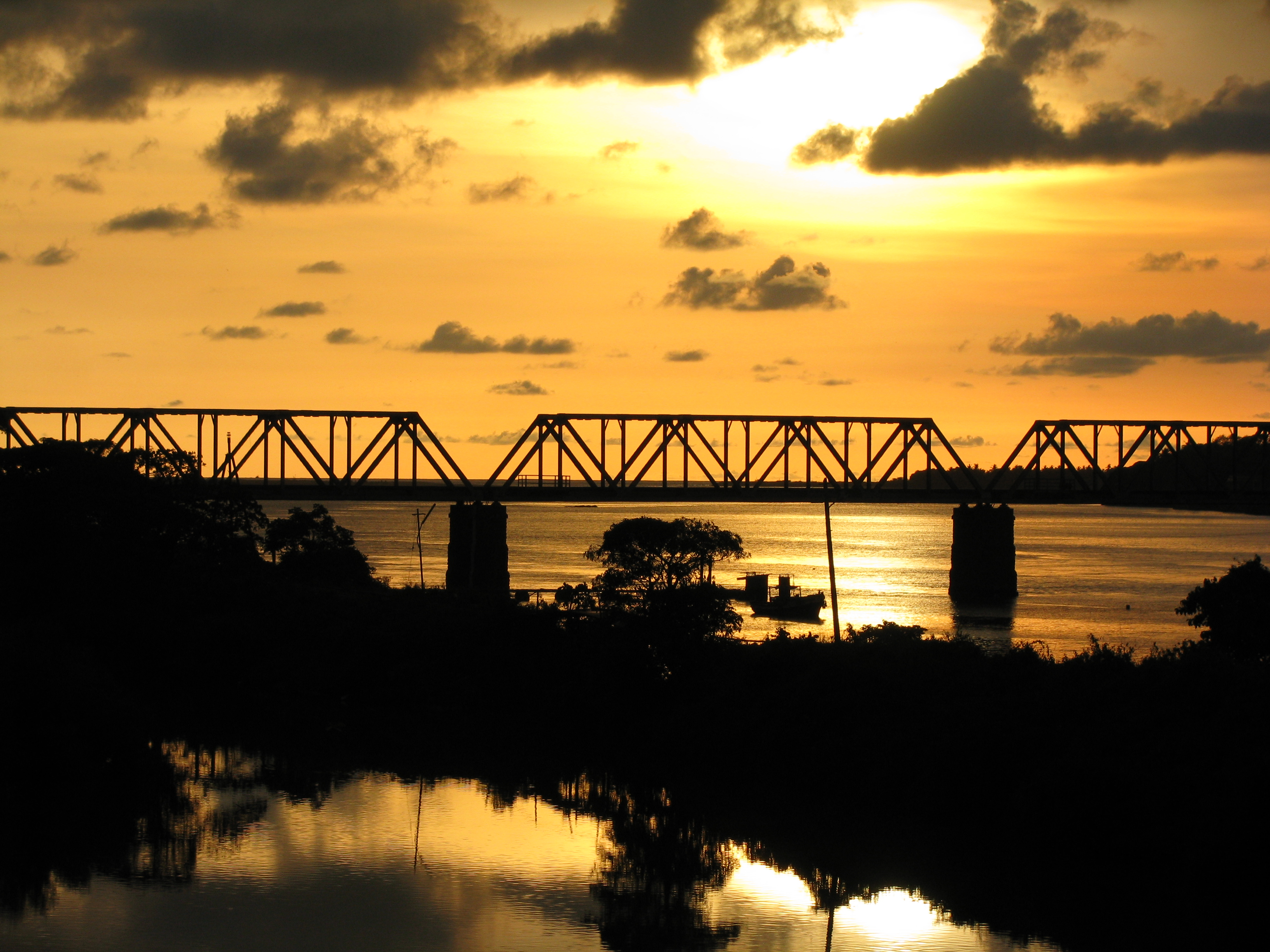
- Coordinates: 12.8391°N 74.8601°E
- Carries: 4 lanes of traffic, 2 way pedestrians
- Crosses: Netravati River
- Locale: Mangaluru, Karnataka, India
- Other name(s): Ullal Bridge

Characteristics
- Total length: 804 metres (2,638 ft)
- Height: 33.25 feet

Netravati Bridge is on NH 66 in Mangaluru, Dakshina Kannada, Karnataka, India, built over Netravati River, which connects Mangaluru city with its southern suburbs Thokottu, Ullal and Deralakatte. This bridge is also called Ullal Bridge as this bridge is located in the town called Ullal in Mangalore taluk.

The total length of this bridge is 830 metres.

This bridge is on the Karnataka – Kerala national highway NH 66. As part of the national highway it was 2 lane wide. When the roads were widened, the additional bridge was built parallel to old bridge and it was released to public on 20 March 2014. The new bridge has a total of 24 pillars including 18 pillars amidst the water and 6 pillars alongside the river. The height of each pillar is 33.25 feet tall.

== Gallery ==
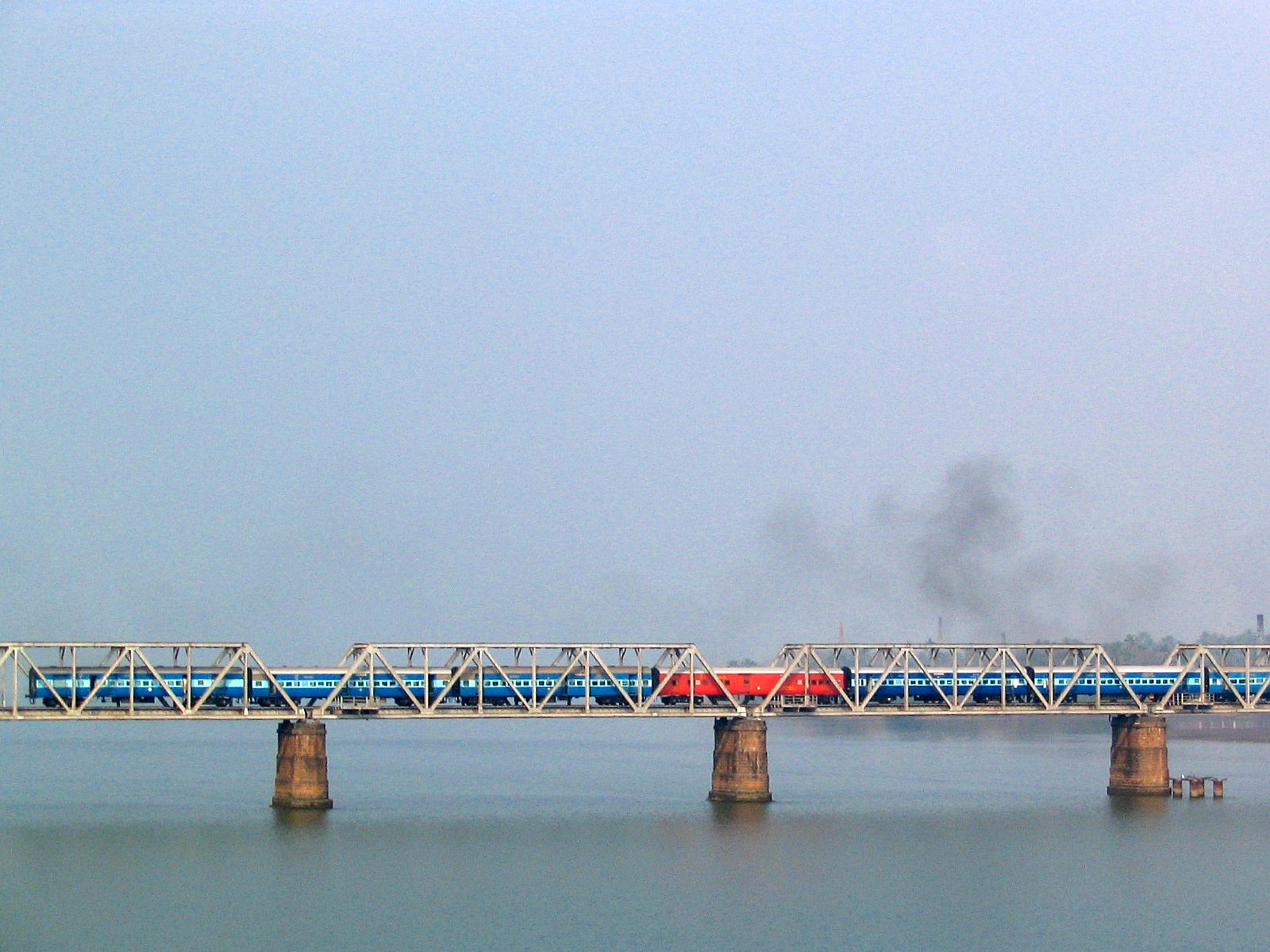
Netravati railway bridge serves as the gateway to Mangaluru

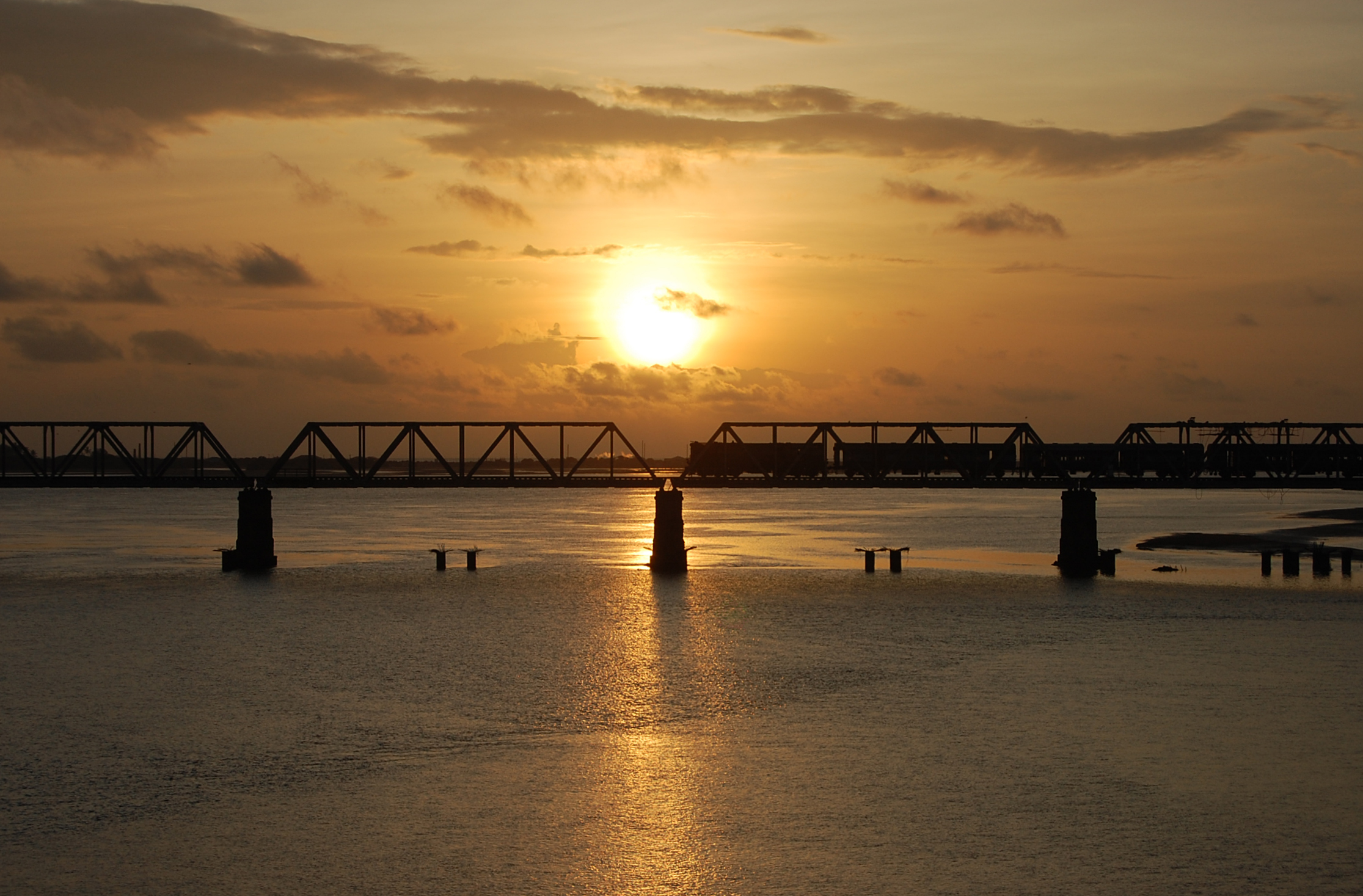
Ullal Bridge Mangaluru
