= Banga Arasa =

Mediaeval Indian dynastic title

Banga Arasa or Banga Raja is the dynastic title of a medieval ruling family of coastal Karnataka, India. The word Banga is the name of a clan and a surname of the Tulu Bunts and the word Arasa or Raja means a ruler in the Tulu language. The dynasty followed the Bunt custom of matrilineal inheritance (ALiyasantana). The Banga Arasas claimed descent from the ancient Alupas and the rulers bore the Alupa royal title Pandyapparasa. The Banga Arasas were said to have been given control of 15 sub-divisions (Magane) of Southern Tulu Nadu by the Hoysala Ballal Emperor, Vira Narasimha. The Banga Arasas ruled from 1224 C.E until the conquest of South Canara by the British in 1799 CE. Descendants of the dynasty survive. However, the family seems to have stopped the coronation ritual after 1889 CE. Since the cessation of the coronation ritual no member of the family has borne the princely title Banga Arasa or Banga Raja instead preferring the aristocratic title Ballal. The dynasty patronized Jainism.They also built Hindu temples as well as shrines to deities of the Buta Kola folk tradition. Ullalthi, a form of the mother goddess worshiped in the Buta Kola tradition was the tutelary deity of the dynasty.

== History and Chronology ==
Following the decline of the Alupas, the coastal districts of Karnataka which is also known as Tulu Nadu came under the sway of various local Bunt-Jain feudal families. The formation of the Banga Arasa dynasty took place around the same time. However, the Banga Arasas claimed an ancient lineage as they considered themselves to be the direct descendants of the Alupas. The first known king of the Banga Arasa dynasty was Pandyastha Banga who was crowned by the Hoysala Ballal Emperor Vira Narasimha himself. The Banga Arasas were said to have subdued the Nandar dynasty of Nandavara and took control of their territories as well. The Banga Arasas were also known to have established matrimonial relations with the neighboring Chowta royal family. Queen Abbakka Chowta was married to the Banga king Lakshmappa Arasa. The Banga Arasas were at their peak during the reign of Lakshmappa Arasa Bangaraja I (1400-1455 A.D.), who built four palaces at Bangawadi (now called Bangadi), Belthangady, Mangalore and Nandavara. Due to the prevalence of the matrilineal Aliyasantana law of inheritance five women from the family also ruled.

== Rulers ==
Vithala Devi (1239-1264 A.D.) is the first known queen of the dynasty. The chronology of the Banga Arasas is given in the table below.

Ruler's name	Year of reign
Pandyastha Bangaraja	1224- 1239 C.E
Vithala Devi	1239-1264 C.E
Kamaraya I	1264-1274 C.E.
Padumala Devi	1274-1287 C.E
Havali Bangaraja I	1287-1323 C.E.
Shankara Devi	1323-1349 C.E.
Havali Bangaraja II	1349-1400 C.E.
Lakshmappa Arasa Bangaraja I	1400-1455 C.E.
Shankara Devi II	1455-1491 C.E.
Kamaraya II	1491-1533 C.E.
Havali Bangaraja III	1533-1545 C.E.
Lakshmappa Arasa Bangaraja II	1545-1556 C.E.
Kamaraya III	1556-1612 C.E.
Lakshmappa Arasa Bangaraja III	1612-1629 C.E
Havali Bangaraja IV	1629-1631 C.E.
Shankara Devi III	1631-1653 C.E.
Havali Bangaraja V	1653-1699 C.E.
Lakshmappa Arasa Bangaraja IV	1699-1767 C.E.
Kamaraya IV	1767-1799 A.D

== See also ==
- Alupa dynasty
- Chowta
- Ajila
- Ballal
