= Chowta dynasty (Tulu Nadu) =

Jain dynasty ruling in the Tulu Nadu region

Chowtas of Moodabidri
- 12th century–18th century
- Capital: Puthige, Ullal & Moodabidri
- Religion: Jainism
- Government: Monarchy
- History
  - Established: 12th century
  - Disestablished: 18th century
Preceded by
Alupa dynasty
Succeeded by
Nayakas of Keladi
Portuguese India
British Raj
- Today part of: Karnataka

The Chowta dynasty was a Jain dynasty of Jain Bunt origin that ruled parts of the Tulu Nadu region during the 12th – 18th centuries.

== History ==
The Chowtas were Jain Kings of Tulu Nadu (a province consisting of present-day Dakshina Kannada district of Karnataka, portions of Udupi and Kasargod district in Kerala) in the 12th century. The succession to the throne was as per the Bunt custom of matrilineal inheritance (Aliyasantana). Their kingdom was very small, containing around only 200 villages, but the land was very fertile.

They initially ruled from their capital at Ullal, which was a very prosperous city and busy centre of trade The first known king of the Dynasty was Tirumalaraya Chowta I (1160–1179). His successor, Channaraya Chowta I (reign 1179 – 1219), moved it inland to the city of Puthige. The principality of Chowta split in 1544, with two separate capitals, one at Ullal, under the renowned Queen Abbakka Chowta, and another at Puttige.

=== Decline ===
The Ullal branch seems to have become extinct and c. 1603, the Chowta moved their capital to Moodabidri. In succeeding years Chowta power had greatly diminished due to invasions by Hyder Ali and Tipu Sultan with whom they signed treaties and also had to give up most of their territory. Chandrasekhara Chikkaraya Chowta V was the last Chowta king who had some authority. He reigned from 1783 to 1822. Following the conquest of South Canara by the British the Chowtas lost all their power except that they received a small pension from the then government. Descendants of the chowta rulers still survive and inhabit the Chowtara Aramane (Chowta Palace) of Moodabidri, which is known for its ornate carvings such as the Nava Nari Kunjara (Nine Damsel Elephant).

== See also ==
- Abbakka Chowta, the great Chowta queen who fought the Portuguese colonizers of India.
- Alupa dynasty, another dynasty which ruled in Tulu Nadu long before the Chowtas.
- List of Jain empires and dynasties
- Chowta
