= Inoli =

Coordinates: 17°30′N 77°26′E

- Village
- Interactive map of Inoli
- Country: India
- State: Karnataka

Languages
  - Official: Kannada
- Time zone: UTC+5:30 (IST)
- Postal code: 574199

Inoli is a small village in Dakshina Kannada, India on the banks of the Netravati River.

== Temple ==
The place is historically significant as it has the ruins of an ancient temple of Somanatha (or Lord Shiva). It is believed that the temple was destroyed couple of centuries ago as European invasion began in India.

The ruins of the Shree Somanatheshwara Durgaparameshwari Temple are on the top of a hill with a scenic view by the side of Nethravathi River. This is the only place where the river turns north during its course.

This temple is sanctified by the presence of Sri Durgaparameshwari and Sri Ganesh.

Villagers say that there are five Somanatha temples around the area: Ullala, Ammembala, Ira, Inoli, and Konaje. Abbakka Queen of Ullala was an ardent devotee of Sri Somanatha. Of the five, the last one at Konaje has also been destroyed and the exact location is not known.

The temple is currently being reconstructed with participation from the people of Inoli and surrounding areas.
