= Pavoor, Dakshina Kannada =

Pavoor, Dakshina Kannada Pavoor
- village
- Location in Karnataka, India Pavoor, Dakshina Kannada (India)
- Coordinates: 12.87°N 74.84°E
- Country: India
- State: Karnataka
- District: Dakshina Kannada
- Talukas: Mangalore

Population (2001)
  - Total: 5,846

Languages
  - Official: Kannada
- Time zone: UTC+5:30 (IST)
- ISO 3166 code: IN-KA
- Vehicle registration: KA
- Website: karnataka.gov.in

Pavoor is a village in the southern state of Karnataka, India. It is located in the Mangalore taluk of Dakshina Kannada district.

== Demographics ==
As of 2001 India census, Pavoor had a population of 5846 with 2888 males and 2958 females.

== See also ==
- Mangalore
- Dakshina Kannada
- Districts of Karnataka
