= Abbakka Chowta =

- Queen Rani of Ullal
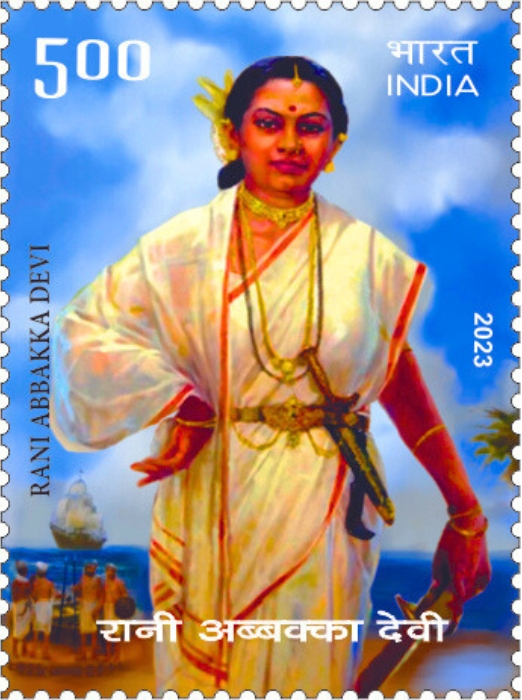
- Abbakka Chowta on a 2023 stamp of India
- Reign: 1525 – 1570
- Predecessor: Tirumala Raya Chowta
- Spouse: Banga Lakshmappa Arasa
- House: Chowta
- Military career
- Conflicts: Ullal–Portuguese conflicts

Rani Abbakka Chowta was the first Tuluva Queen of Ullal who fought the Portuguese in the latter half of the 16th century. She belonged to the Chowta dynasty, an indigenous Tuluva dynasty who ruled over parts of coastal Karnataka (Tulu Nadu), India. Their capital was Puttige. (Note: There are four places in Karnataka and Kerala whose modern name is Puttige or similar. None seems to have ever been larger than a village. Another candidate for the place is Puttur, a town which is the seat of a modern taluk (which also includes one of the villages called Puttige). An unsourced statement in the corresponding article in Kannada Wiki calls Puttur "the capital of a dynasty of kings" (Kannada: ವಂಶದ ಅರಸರ ರಾಜಧಾನಿಯಾಗಿತ್ತು).) The port town of Ullal served as their subsidiary capital. The Portuguese made several attempts to capture Ullal as it was strategically placed. But Abbakka repulsed each of their attacks for over four decades. For her bravery, she came to be known as Abhaya Rani (The fearless queen). She was also one of the earliest Indians to fight European colonialism and is sometimes regarded as the 'first woman freedom fighter of India'. In the state of Karnataka, she is celebrated along with Rani Kittur Chennamma, Keladi Chennamma, Rani Chennabhairadevi and Onake Obavva, as the foremost women warriors and patriots.

== Early life ==
Ullal was the capital of the Chowta king Thirumala Raya III. Feudatories of the Vijayanagar kingdom, the Chowtas were Tuluva kings who practiced Tuluva Animism (Būtaradhane). The Chowtas followed the system of matrilineal inheritance (Aliyasantana) of Bunts community by which Tirumala Raya, Abbakka's uncle, crowned her the queen of Ullal.

He also forged a matrimonial alliance for Abbakka with Lakshmappa Arasa Bangaraja II, king of Banga principality in Mangalore. This alliance was to later prove a source of worry for the Portuguese. Tirumala Raya also trained Abbakka in the different aspects of warfare and military strategy. The marriage, however, was short-lived and Abbakka returned to Ullal. Her husband thus longed for revenge against Abbakka and was to later join the Portuguese in their fight against Abbakka.

== Historical background ==
After overrunning Goa and taking control of it, the Portuguese turned their attention southwards and along the coast. They first attacked the South Kanara coast in 1525 and destroyed the Mangalore port. Ullal was a prosperous port and a hub of the spice trade to Arabia and other countries in the west. Being the profitable trading center that it was, the Portuguese, the Dutch and the British vied with one another for control of the region as well as the trade routes. They, however, had not been able to make much headway as the resistance from the local chieftains was very strong. The local rulers even forged alliances cutting across caste and religious lines.

Abbakka was crowned as the queen in 1525. Abbakka's administration was well represented by Jains, Hindus as well as Muslims. Historical research also reveals that during her rule in the 16th century, Beary men had served as seamen in the naval force. Rani Abbakka had personally supervised the construction of dam at Malali; she had appointed Bearys for boulder work.[11] Her army too consisted of people of all sects and castes. She even forged alliances with the Zamorin of Calicut. Together, they kept the Portuguese at bay. The marital ties with the neighbouring Banga dynasty added further strength to the alliance of the local rulers. She also gained support from powerful king Venkatappanayaka of Bidnur and ignored the threat of Portuguese forces.

== Battles against the Portuguese ==
The Portuguese, clearly upset by Abbakka's tactics, demanded that she pay them tribute but Abbakka refused to yield. In 1555, the Portuguese sent Admiral Dom Álvaro da Silveira to fight her after she refused to pay them tribute. In the battle that followed, Rani Abbakka once again managed to hold her own and repulsed the attack successfully.

In 1557, the Portuguese plundered Mangalore and laid waste to it. In 1568, they turned their attention to Ullal but Abbakka Rani resisted them yet again. João Peixoto, a Portuguese general and a fleet of soldiers were sent by the Portuguese Viceroy António Noronha. They managed to capture the city of Ullal and also entered the royal court. Abbakka Rani, however, escaped and took refuge in a mosque. The same night, she gathered around 200 of her soldiers and mounted an attack on the Portuguese. In the battle that ensued, General Peixoto was killed, seventy Portuguese soldiers were taken prisoners and many of the Portuguese retreated. In further attacks, Abbakka Rani and her supporters killed Admiral Mascarenhas and forced the Portuguese to vacate the Mangalore fort.

The Portuguese captured Mangalore fort again and Kundapur (Basrur). Despite these gains, Abbakka Rani continued to remain a source of threat. With the help of the queen's estranged husband, they mounted attacks on Ullal. Furious battles followed, but Abbakka Rani held her own. In 1570, she formed an alliance with the Bijapur Sultan of Ahmed Nagar and the Zamorin of Calicut, who were also opposing the Portuguese. Kutty Pokar Markar, the Zamorin's general fought on behalf of Abbakka and destroyed the Portuguese fort at Mangalore, but was killed by the Portuguese on his return. Following these losses and her husband's treachery, Abbakka lost the war, was arrested, and went to jail. However, even in prison, she revolted and died fighting.

== Administration and Trade ==
Abbakka established Ullal as a major trading port, dealing primarily in pepper, cardamom, and rice. She maintained strong diplomatic relations with Arab merchants and the Zamorin of Calicut. Her administration was marked by:

- Strategic naval alliances with the Mogaveeras
- Development of trade routes along the Malabar coast
- Fortification of coastal defenses
- Promotion of local industries and commerce

== Religious and Cultural Patronage ==
- Several Jain basadis were renovated
- Religious texts were translated into local languages
- Art and architecture flourished
- Cultural exchanges were promoted through trade relations

== Folklore and legend ==
According to traditional accounts, she was an immensely popular queen and this is also attested by the fact that she is even today a part of folklore. The queen's story has been retold from generation to generation through folk songs and Yakshagana, a popular folk theatre in Tulu Nadu. In Buta Kola, Tuluva Animism, the persona in trance recounts the great deeds of Abbakka Chowta. Abbakka is portrayed as dark and good looking, always dressed in simple clothes like a commoner. She is portrayed as a caring Queen who worked late into the night dispensing justice. Legends also claim that Abbakka was the last known person to have used the fire-arrow in her fight against the Portuguese. Some accounts also claim that she had two equally valiant daughters who fought alongside her in her wars against the Portuguese.

== Legacy ==
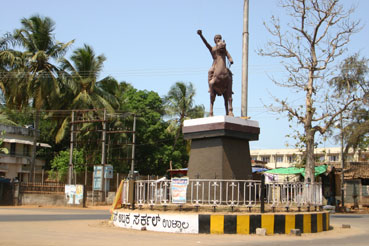
Life size statue of the Chowta Queen Abbakka in Ullal

Abbakka's memory is much cherished in her home town of Ullal. The "Veera Rani Abbakka Utsava" is an annual celebration held in her memory. The Veera Rani Abbakka Prashasti award is given to distinguished women on the occasion. On 15 January 2003, the Indian postal department issued a special cover on Rani Abbakka. There have been calls to name the Bajpe airport. A bronze statue of the queen has been erected in Ullal and another in Bangalore. Amar Chitra Katha published a book named 'Rani Abbakka- The Queen who knew no fear'. The Karnataka Itihasa Academy has called for renaming the Queen's road in the state capital as 'Rani Abbakka Devi road'. Actress Barkha Sengupta portrays Rani Abbakka in TV series Swaraj of DD National. Indian Railways Has An Locomotive Engine Dedicated To Queen Abbakka Chowta.

== Rani Abbakka-class patrol vessel ==
The Indian Coast Guard ship ICGS Rani Abbakka, the 1st of a series of five inshore patrol vessels (IPV) built at Hindustan Shipyard Ltd is named after Abbakka Mahadevi was commissioned in Visakhapatnam on 20 January 2012, and is based in Chennai.

== Veer Rani Abakka Festival and Award ==
The festival of "Veera Rani Abbakka Utsava" is celebrated in Ullal every year in memory of Rani Abakka during which the Veera Rani Abbakka Award is given to distinguished women in recognition of their contributions in various fields.

The Abbakka Award 2018–19 was given to Dr. Sandhya Pai, for achievement in the field of literature and to Urmila Ramesh Kumar, for her achievement in various field except literature.

== See also ==
- Ullal
- Tulunadu
- Goa Inquisition
- Battle of Colachel
