= Shri Vinayaka Shankaranarayana Durgamba Temple =

Coordinates: 12°52′13.4″N 75°2′12.3″E

The Shri Vinayaka Shankaranarayana Durgamba temple is a temple in Nandavara, Dakshina Kannada, Karnataka, India, located on the banks of the Netravathi river. It is the sanctum sanctorum of thousands of devotees from all over the world. The temple is 3 km (1.9 mi) from Marnabailu.

== Facilities and activities ==
Devotees participate in the age-old Jathra Mahotsava and many other religious activities conducted at the Kshethra.

In spite of natural deterioration, the Kshethra has maintained its status through its religious and social activities. Development works are proceeding rapidly.

The newly built all-purpose "Nanda Deepa" auditorium, the new Bhojanashala, "The Community Tower", have all added to the historical Kshethra. The Thirtha Mantap and Gharbhagudi of the Lord Vinayaka, Lord Shankara Narayana, Lord Shri Durgamba have been remodeled. A new main entrance and Swagatha Gopuram at the entrance have been built. A new brass-covered holy flagpole has been erected. Many more development activities are planned at the Kshethra.

"Akhaya, Neyhravathi" which caters to the mid-day meals program and free medical checkup camp has been set up at the Kshethra to serve the people of the region.
