= Thiruvail =

- village
- Location in Karnataka, India Thiruvail (India)
- Coordinates: 12.87°N 74.84°E
- Country: India
- State: Karnataka
- District: Dakshina Kannada
- Talukas: Mangalore

Government
  - Body: Gram panchayat

Population (2001)
  - Total: 6,336

Languages
  - Official: Kannada
- Time zone: UTC+5:30 (IST)
- ISO 3166 code: IN-KA
- Vehicle registration: KA
- Website: karnataka.gov.in

Thiruvail is a village in the southern state of Karnataka, India. It is located in the Mangalore taluk of Dakshina Kannada district.

== Demographics ==
As of 2001 India census, Thiruvail had a population of 6336 with 3043 males and 3293 females.

== See also ==
- Mangalore
- Dakshina Kannada
- Districts of Karnataka
