= Chowta (surname) =

Chowta (also spelt Chouta) is a surname from coastal Karnataka in India. It is found among the Bunt community.

== History ==
It is also the name of the Jain dynasty, who ruled certain parts of the Tulu Nadu region for several centuries (12th - 18th). The succession to the throne was as per the matrilineal custom of inheritance (Aliyasantana). They initially ruled from their capital at Ullal and the first known king of the Dynasty was Tirumalaraya Chowta I (reign 1160–1179). His successor, Channaraya Chowta I (reign 1179–1219), moved it inland to Puttige.

The principality of Chowta split in 1544 giving rise to two separate capitals: one at Ullala under the renowned Queen Abbakka Chowta, and another at Puttige. The Ullal branch seemed to have become extinct and c. 1603, the Chowta moved their capital to Moodabidri. In succeeding years, Chowta's power had greatly diminished due to invasions by Hyder Ali and Tipu Sultan with whom they signed treaties. Chandrasekhara Chikkaraya Chowta V was the last Chowta king who had some authority. He reigned from 1783 to 1822. Following the conquest of South Canara by the British, the Chowtas had lost all their power except for a small pension they received from the then government. Descendants of the Chowta rulers still survive today and have inhabited the Chowtara Aramane (Chowta Palace) of Moodabidri, which is known for its ornate carvings such as the Nava Nari Kunjara (Nine Damsel Elephant).

== Notable people ==
Notable people with the surname Chowta, who may or may not be members of the Jain community, include:

- Abbakka Chowta, Queen of Ullal
- Sandeep Chowta, Indian music composer
- D. K. Chowta, Indian writer
- Prajna Chowta, Indian conservationist

== See also ==
- Saavira Kambada Basadi
- Moodabidri
