= Ullal City Municipal Council =

Ullal City Municipal Council ಉಳ್ಳಾಲ ನಗರಸಭೆ

Type
- Type: City Municipal Council of Ullal
- Term limits: 5 years
- Established: 2014

Leadership
- President: Chithrakala Chandrakanth, INC since 2 November 2020
- Vice President: Ayub Manchila, INC since 2 November 2020

Structure
- Seats: 31 (elected)
- Political groups: Government (15); INC (13); IND (2); One Vote by MLA; Opposition (16); BJP (6); SDPI (6); JDS (4)

Elections
- Voting system: First-past-the-post
- Last election: 3 September 2018
- Next election: 2023

Meeting place
- Near Bus Stand, Ullal Darga Rd, Ullal, Karnataka 575020

Website
- www.ullalcity.mrc.gov.in

The Ullal City Municipal is the municipal corporation responsible for looking after the city administration of the city of Ullal in Mangalore, Karnataka, India.

The Ullal location was formed as Nagara Panchayat in 1996. This was upgraded to Town Municipal Council in 2006. In 2014, this was again upgraded to City Municipal Council.

Ullal is a region/neighborhood in the southern part of Mangalore city with a population more than 53,000 as per the 2011 census. The incumbent president of the corporation is Chithrakala Chandrakanth and the vice president Ayub Manchila. Ullal was upgraded from Town Municipal to City Municipal in the year 2014. Ullal City Municipal along with Mangalore City Corporation forms a continuous urban area and comes under Mangalore Urban Agglomeration.

Ullal City Municipal belongs to Mangalore(erstwhile Ullal) — Vidhan Sabha constituency of Karnataka Legislative assembly and Dakshina Kannada (Lok Sabha constituency) of the Lok Sabha (lower house of the Indian parliament).

== See also ==
- Ullal
- Thokottu
- Mangalore City Corporation
