= Puttige =

Puttige may refer to:

- Puthige, Dakshina Kannada, a small village in the Mangalore taluk of Dakshina Kannada district, Karnataka, India
- Puttige (Puthige), a village in Puttur taluk of Dakshina Kannada district
- Puttige (Puthige), a village near Moodabidri in Dakshina Kannada district
- Puthige, Kasaragod, Kerala, India
- Puttige matha, is one of Ashta Mathas of Udupi established by Madhvacharya.
