= Shyamal Dutta Ray =

Indian painter (1934–2005)

- Born: 8 May 1934; Ranchi (present-day Jharkhand)
- Died: 19 May 2005 (aged 71); Kolkata, West Bengal, India
- Education: Government College of Art and Craft, Calcutta
- Known for: Painting Watercolour
- Movement: Contemporary art

Shyamal Dutta Ray, also spelt as Shyamal Dutt Ray (Bengali: শ্যামল দত্ত রায়) (8 May 1934 – 19 May 2005) was a Bengali contemporary painter.

His paintings marked a pivotal role in the history of the Bengal School of Art. He is recognised to have brought intensity to the medium of watercolours when the Bengal School of Art used light and watery hues. He was also one of the founding members of the artists' collective Society of Contemporary Artists.

Dutta Ray served as a teacher in the Jagadbandhu Institution.

His pieces can be found in the collections of the Glenbarra Art Museum in Japan, the Victoria and Albert Museum in London, the National Gallery of Modern Art in Delhi, the National Museum of Modern Art in Baghdad, the Chittagong University museum in Bangladesh, and the Shilpa Kala Academy, as well as the Government College of Arts in Dhaka, Bangladesh.

He was a recipient of the Gold Medal from the Academy of Fine Arts, Kolkata, in 1958. In 1982, he was honoured with the National Award from the Lalit Kala Akademi. In 1968, the Rabindra Bharati University honoured him with the Rabindra Bharati University Award.

In addition, he received the Birla Academy of Art and Culture Award four times, in 1972, 1973, 1975 and 1978. Dutta Ray has garnered other honours, including the 1988 Shiromani Kala Puraskar and the Special Commendation of the Karnataka Chitrakala Parishath in Bangalore, Karnataka.

== Artistic style ==
The paradoxes of the world around him are reflected in his reflective and gloomy paintings. Dutta Ray's art mostly depicts Calcutta's urban life, with all of its joy and sadness, conflict and hardship, poverty and optimism.

== Accolades and participations ==
Dutta Ray has won numerous awards, including the Karnataka Chitrakala Parishath's Special Commendation in 1988 as well as the Shiromani Kala Puraskar which he received in 1988. He was also the recipient of the Lalit Kala Akademi's Merit Award. Indian major cities like Mumbai, Delhi, Kolkata, and Bangalore have all hosted exhibitions of his paintings. He was also the four-time winner of the Birla Academy of Art and Culture Award for 1972, 1973, 1975 and 1978. He has taken part in international exhibitions such as the Havana Biennale in Cuba and the Third World Biennale of Graphics in London.

== Death ==
Dutta Ray died on the 5 May 2005.
