= Karnataka Chitrakala Parishath =

Visual art complex

Coordinates: 12.98918°N 77.58053°E

- Abbreviation: CKP
- Formation: 1960; 66 years ago
- Founder: S. S. Kukke, M. Arya Murthy, M.S. Nanjunda Rao
- Location: Bangalore, India
- Website: Karnataka Chitrakala Parishath

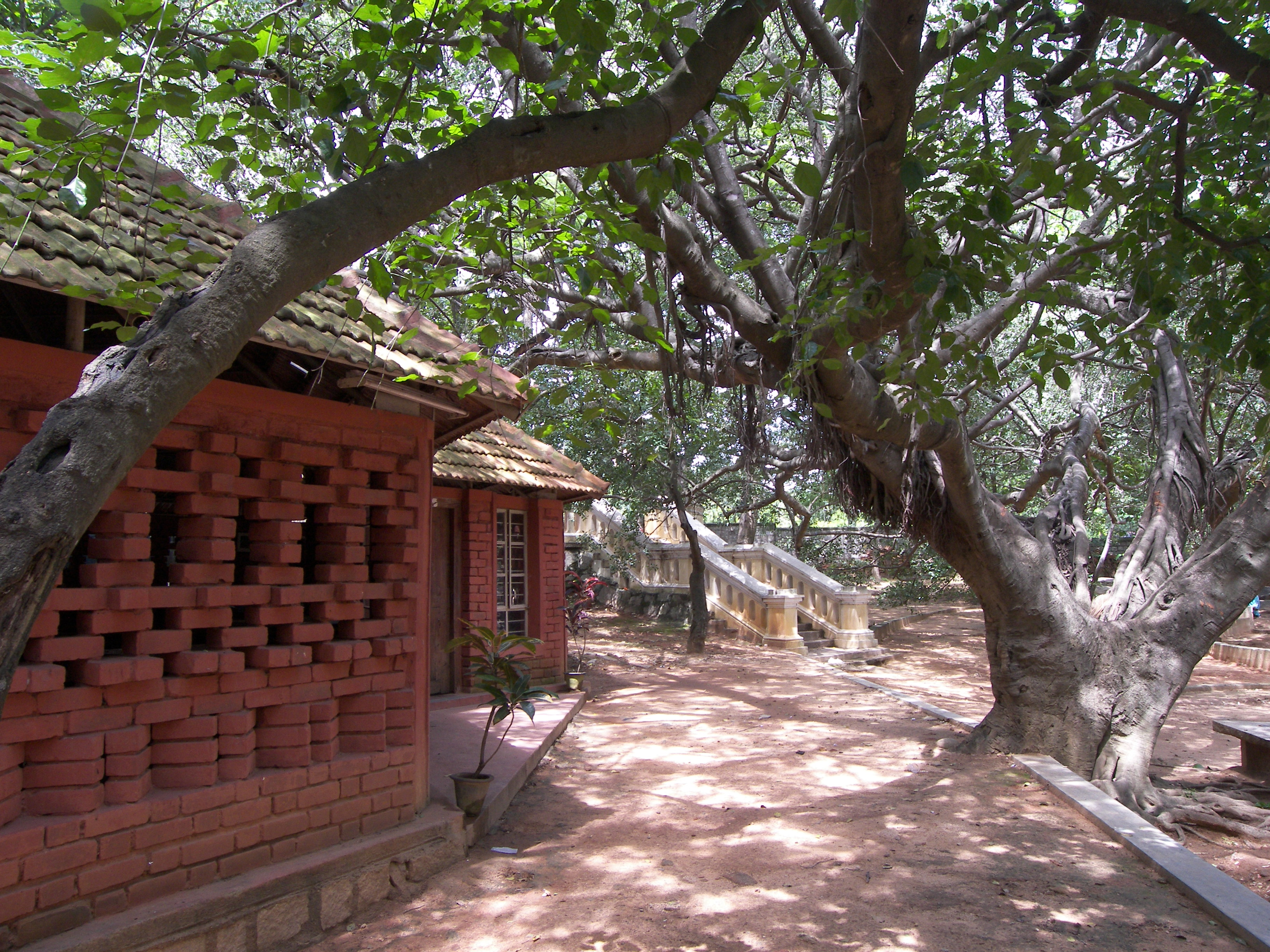
The classrooms, Chitrakala Parishath's campus

Karnataka Chitrakala Parishath is a visual art complex in Bangalore, India. It has 18 galleries, 13 of which have a permanent collection of paintings, sculptures and folk art. The other galleries are rented out for exhibitions. The folk art collection showcases Mysore paintings and leather puppets. The Parishat runs the College of Fine Arts, a visual arts college. Each January it organizes Chitra Santhe, a cultural event showcasing affordable art. The motto of the event is "Art for All".

== History ==
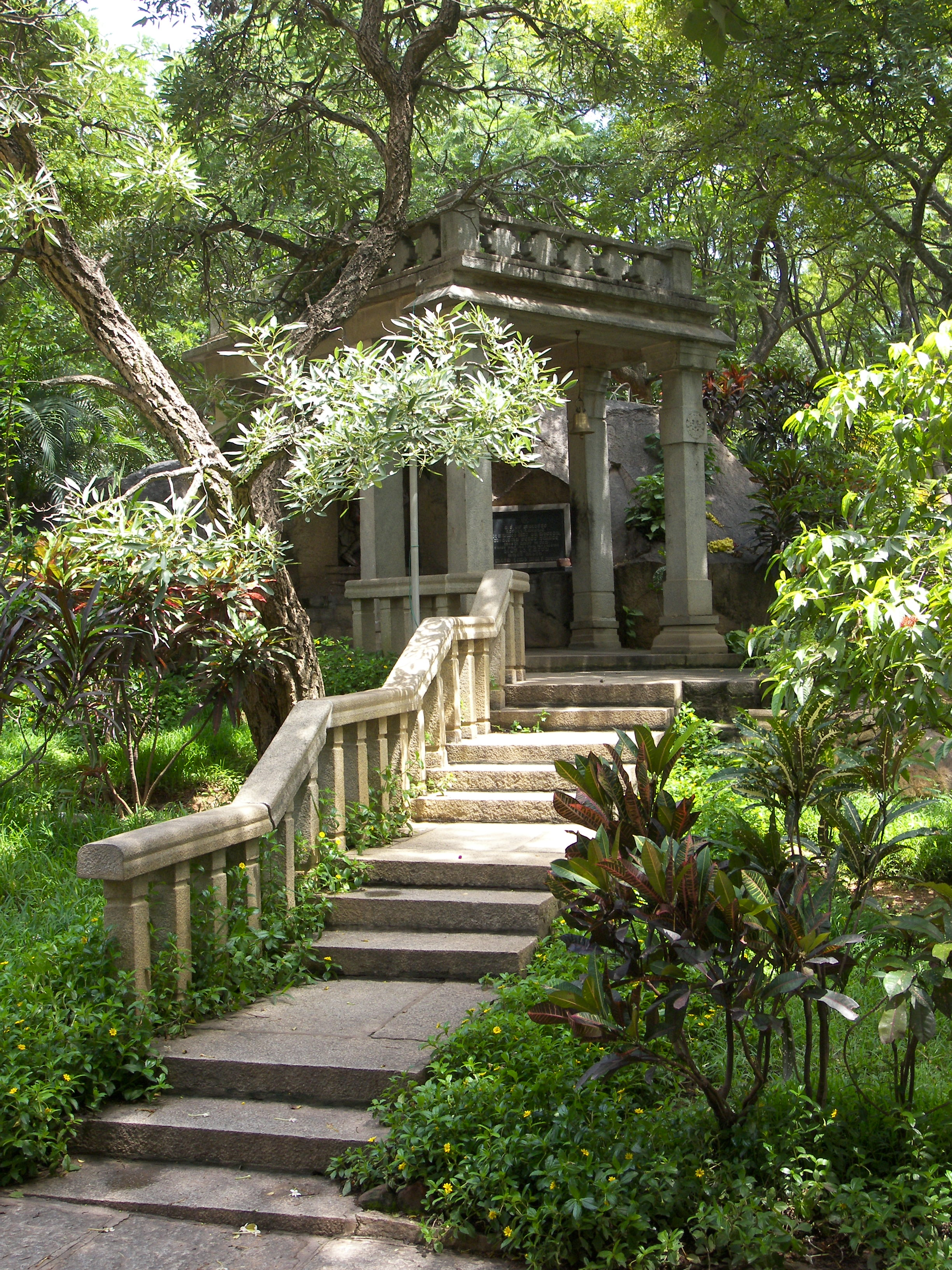
Stone temple, Chitrakala Parishath's campus

Kengal Hanumanthaiah, the Chief Minister of the Mysore State, while building the Vidhana Soudha, called for a tender for an arts-related endeavour. All the artists called were from outside Karnataka. Startled by the lack of applicants from the State, Hanumanthaiah is said to have summoned M. Aryamurthy, a senior artist, and urged him to form an organisation of artists. In 1960, Aryamurthy then set up the Mysore Chitrakala Parishath at his garage in his house on Double Road in Shantinagar,

In 1964, the Parishath became an arts college, Chitrakala Vidyalaya and was housed on the top floor of Gandhi Sahitya Sangha in Malleswaram. A diploma course was taught there by M. S. Nanjunda Rao, M. Gopal and S. S. Kukke. In 1966, it obtained recognition as an art centre by the state and national Lalit Kala Akademi.

During the mid-1970s, the Parishath was shifted to its current location, a three-acre-wide thicket next to the Chief Minister’s bungalow on Kumara Krupa Road, leased by the Government of Karnataka, with initial donations from industrialist H. K. Kejriwal.

In 1993, the INTACH was set up on campus, in collaboration with the Parishath.

== Galleries ==
Karnataka Chitrakala Parishath houses eighteen galleries; five of which are open for artists to exhibit their works. The remaining thirteen galleries showcase permanent collections of paintings, sculptures and folk art.

Chitrakala Parishath houses India's largest collection of work by Russian-born cosmopolitan artist, Nicholas Roerich, titled "Himalayan Series Studies". His son, Svetoslav Roerich, donated this collection of thirty-six paintings.

The permanent collection also includes works by Amrita Sher-Gil, Jamini Roy, Rabindranath Tagore, Gaganendranath Tagore, AR Chughtai, MF Husain, SH Raza, FN Souza, and Shyamal Dutta Ray, among others.

== Chitra Santhe ==
After the founder, M.S. Nanjunda Rao died in 2003, a new committee was formed, with D. K. Chowta as General Secretary and M. J. Kamalakshi as Joint Secretary. According to Kamalakshi, members of the Parishath who had observed street art festivals in Europe, held meetings to explore the feasibility of organizing a similar annual event in Bangalore. Subsequently, Chitra Santhe became a reality in 2004.

Since 2004, Chitra Santhe has been organized annually on the final Sunday of January as Bangalore's annual art festival. During the festival, the entire stretch of road from Shivananda Circle to Windsor Manor Hotel is converted into an open art gallery. The exhibition and sale of artworks are open to visitors from 8 am to 8 pm.

In 2025, around 1,500 artists from 20 states displayed and sold their works at the festival, that was estimated to have witnessed a footfall of 5 lakh.

== Awards and recognition ==
Karnataka Chitrakala Parishath presents the Chitrakala Samman Awards to recognize four senior artists who have made significant contributions to the growth of art, awarded ahead of the annual Chitra Santhe in Bangalore.
