= Ballal =

Ballal (also spelt as Ballala) is a Tulu surname from coastal Karnataka in India. It is found among Shivalli Madhva Brahmins, Hindu Samantha Arasu, Bunt and Jain Royal communities.

== History ==
The origin of the title 'Ballal' is reflects a claim of descent from the Hoysala dynasty|Hoysala Ballal|Kadamba Dynasty|Hindu Samantha Arasu Ballal kings. The Hoysalas had matrimonial relations with the Alupa royal family of coastal Karnataka. In the Book Prachina Tulunadu (Ancient Tulu nadu), The writers N. S. Kille and N. A. Sheenappa Heggade state that following the decline of Alupas, the coastal region of Karnataka (except kasaragod) came under the sway of powerful local Bunt-Jain feudal families who established feudatory states or chiefdoms. These Feudal lords and petty kings were generally referred to as Bunt Nadava's later owed allegiance to the Vijayanagara Empire. Kadamba kings in the southern regions of erstwhile South Canara and North Kerala sought to establish their high prestige and separate royal identity. The Samantha Arasu Ballal and Varma kings were descendants of the kadamba Dynasty.

Various Ballal families are frequently mentioned in Tulu folk songs called Pardana. The Folk epic of Koti and Chennayya for example, describes a battle between three Ballal princes namely the Ballal of Padumale, the Ballal of Panja and the Ballal of Yenmoor.

The Ballal king is said to have built Shri Vaidyanatha Daivasthana temple, Shaktinagar, Mangalore

Following the chaos that followed the fall of the Vijayanagara Empire, The Nayakas of Keladi took control of the area and seem to have subdued a confederacy of the various Ballal families that held sway in the coastal region of Karnataka. Guedumardady, Maipady, Doltady, Kulur, Panambur, Pedanar, Mudibidri, Yerumal, Kapu, Katpadi, Nidambur, Pervodi, Chittupadi, Belor, Konnara, Mudradi, Hebri, Hiretor, Tomboso, Anaji, Tagrette, Herar, Gololer, Agumbe, Muttur, Malor, Modicar, Adolly, Jeppu, Kedambady, Muloly, and Vitla were said to have been subdued and they were forced to pay annual tributes.

The title Ballal in its feminine form Ballalthi also appears to have been born by females. This was possible as the matrilineal culture of the Bunts allowed women to take family titles and enjoy ownership of land. An inscription from 1673 C.E states that one Sankara Devi Ballalthi possessed ownership of a land called Kambala gadde in Sullia. Some women bearing the title are known to have established ancient temples as well. Ammu Devi Ballalthi was associated with establishing the Dharmasthala Temple and the Ballalthi of Moodubelle is said to have established the Mahalingeshwara temple in Belle, Udupi

== Notable people ==
- Ramabai Peshwa, wife of Madhavrao I
- Ashish Kumar Ballal, former Indian National Hockey Team Captain
- H. S. Ballal, Pro Chancellor, Manipal University
- Hamdan Ballal, Palestinian filmmaker and photographer
- Kishori Ballal, actor
- Vyasaraya Ballal, Kannada writer

== See also ==
- Heggades, another historical title was used by Arasu Samantha ballal family's of Vitla, Karnataka
