= D. K. Chowta =

Indian businessman (1938–2019)

Darbe Krishnananda Chowta
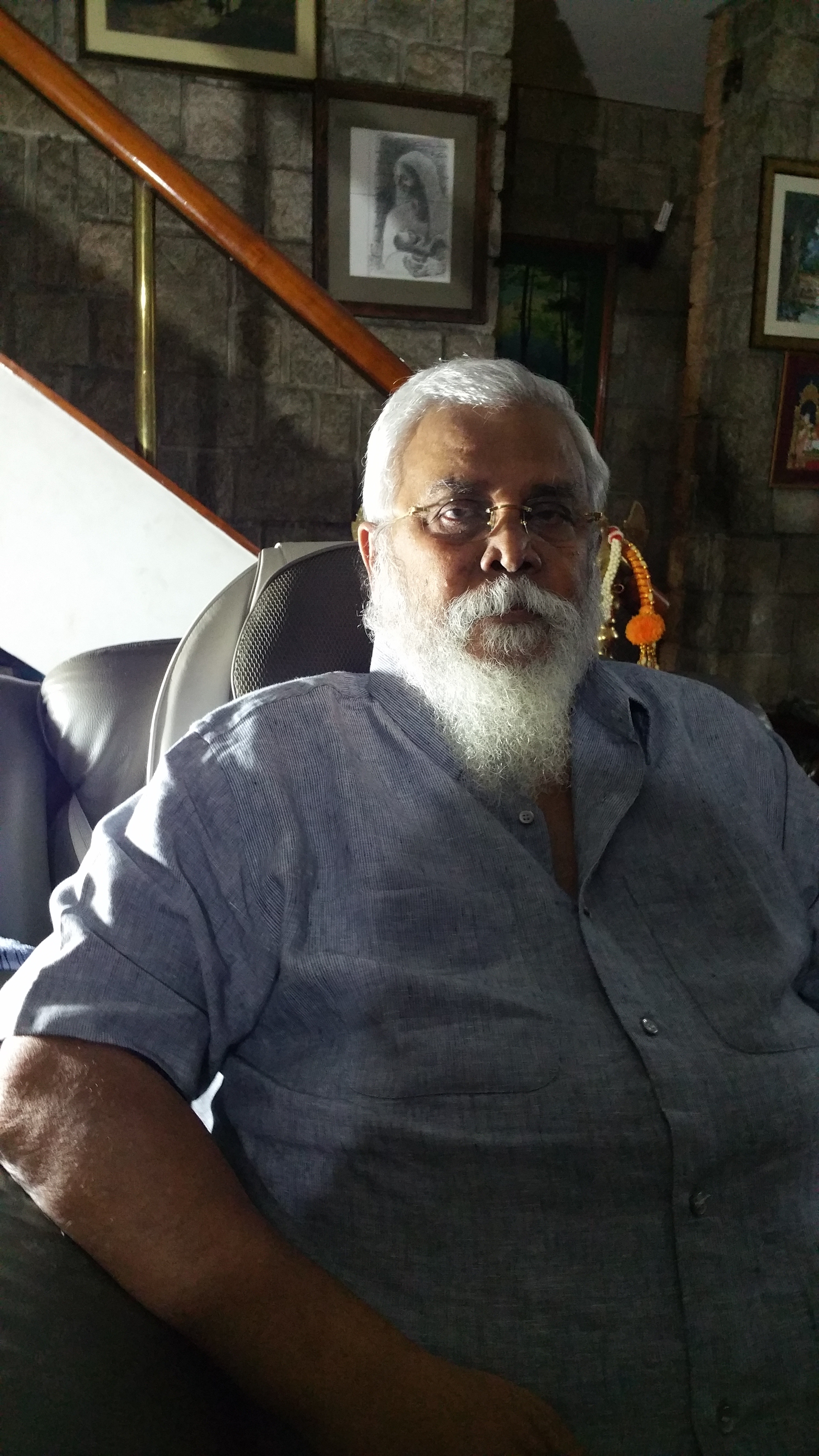
- Born: 1 June 1938; Kerala, India
- Died: 19 June 2019 (aged 81); Bengaluru, India
- Citizenship: India
- Children: Sandeep Chowta; Prajna Chowta

Darbe Krishnananda Chowta (1 June 1938 – 19 June 2019) was an Indian businessman, writer, artist, and theatre personality. At the time of his death he was the general secretary of the Karnataka Chitrakala Parishath a position he had also served in previously.

== Biography ==
Chowta was born in Darbhe Meeyappadau, near Manjeshwar, Kerala, in a Tulu-speaking Bunt family.

After completing his postgraduate studies in economics from Bombay University, Chowta spent several years of his life in Ghana, Nigeria and London. He returned to Bangalore and became involved in industry, exports, country clubs and various businesses, which resulted in the establishment of companies such as M/S Power Gear Ltd., M/S P.C. Exports and Sun Valley Club. M/S P.C. Exports was awarded by the Exports Promotion Council five times. Under his presidency, the Bunts Sangha Bangalore held a World Bunts Convention in 1995.

== Literature ==
Chowta wrote under the pen name of Ananda Krishna. His works, Kariyavajjerena Kathekkulu and Plilipathigadasu, a drama, received awards from the Karnataka Government's Tulu Sahithya Academy. His other works include Pattu Pajjelu, Darmettimaye, Uri Ushnada Maye and Mittabailu Yamunakka. He was awarded an honorary doctorate by Mangalore University.

== Personal life ==
Chowta had two children, Sandeep Chowta (a musician) and Prajna Chowta (an ethnographer).
