= Thokottu =

Thokottu Commercial Junction
- Locality
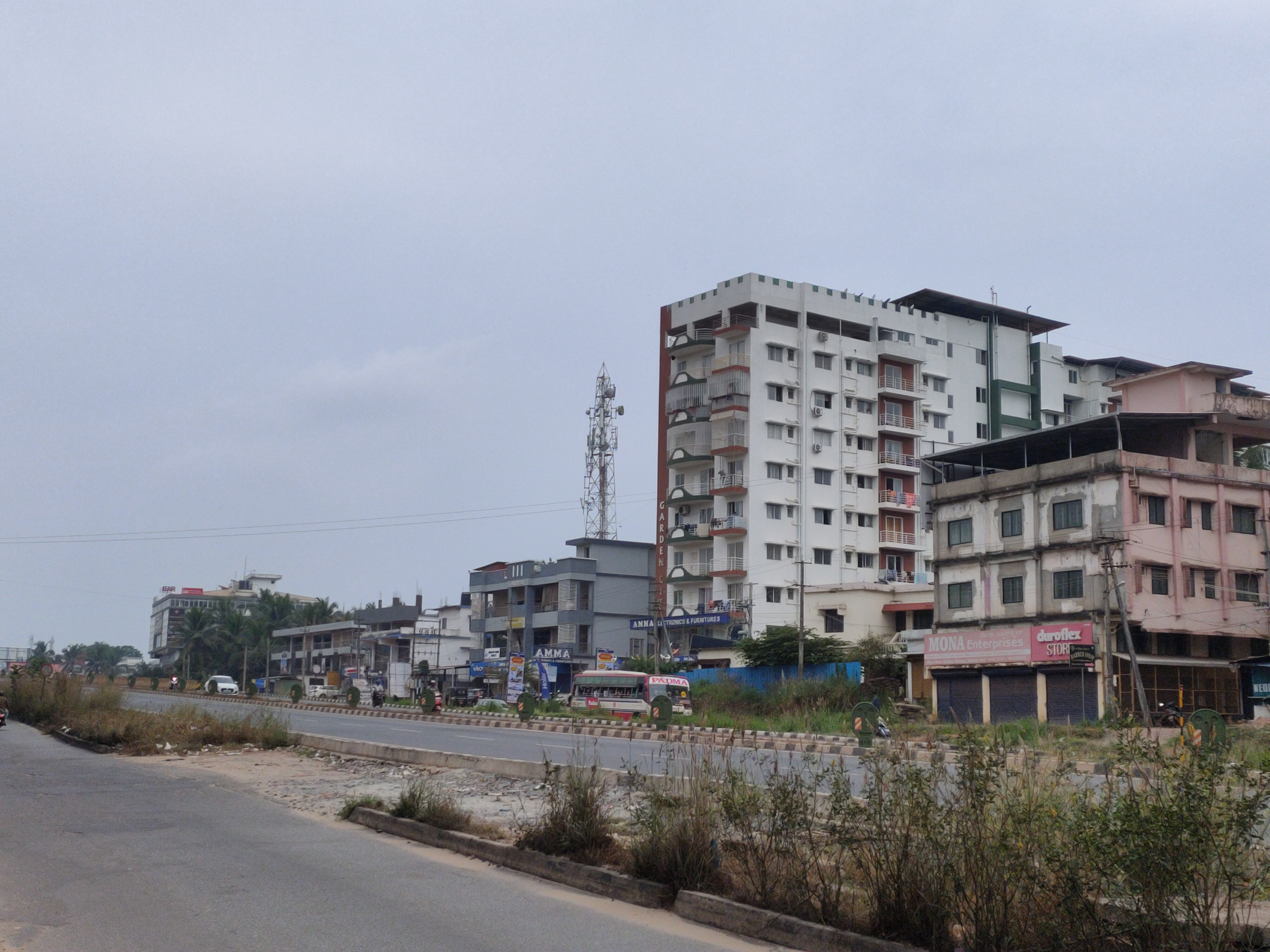
- Thokottu, Mangaluru
- Interactive map of Thokottu
- Coordinates: 12.8173°N 74.8488°E
- Country: India
- State: Karnataka
- District: Dakshina Kannada
- City: Ullal, Mangalore

Government
  - Type: City Municipality
  - Body: Ullal City Municipality

Languages
  - Official: Tulu, Kannada
  - Other: Beary, Konkani
- Time zone: UTC+5:30 (IST)
- PIN: 575020
- Vehicle registration: KA 19
- Website: www.ullalcity.mrc.gov.in

Thokottu is a commercial junction to the south of Mangalore city on National Highway 66 (previously known as NH 17) and the gateway to Mangalore city from the South (Kerala).

It is one of the busiest junctions of Mangalore city where the Medical Corridor Road goes towards east to Deralakatte and Konaje, educational hubs and the other road towards west goes to Ullal. This junction connects Mangalore city, second major city of Karnataka with Talapady and Kerala. A flyover is constructed in the junction to reduce the congestion for the travellers travelling between Mangalore and Kerala. There are also many commercial complexes in the Deralakatte and Konaje area.

== Transport ==
Thokkottu also has a railway station and it is the first stop after the train leaves Mangalore towards south direction. The Mangalore City Corporation limits ends at Kallap just before Thokkottu, and the governance is managed by Ullal City Municipal

Thokkottu has a bus stand with a Commercial complex for City Buses, Service Buses, and Interstate Buses. There are 51 series buses (51, 51A, 51B, 51C, 51D, 51D, 51E, 54, 55) which connect to Thokkottu to Konaje, and 42, 43, 44 series buses connect Thokkottu to Mangalore City.

Thokkottu also has interstate buses between Mangalore Ksrtc bus stand and Kasaragod (Kerala) which are run by Karnataka State Road Transport Corporation.

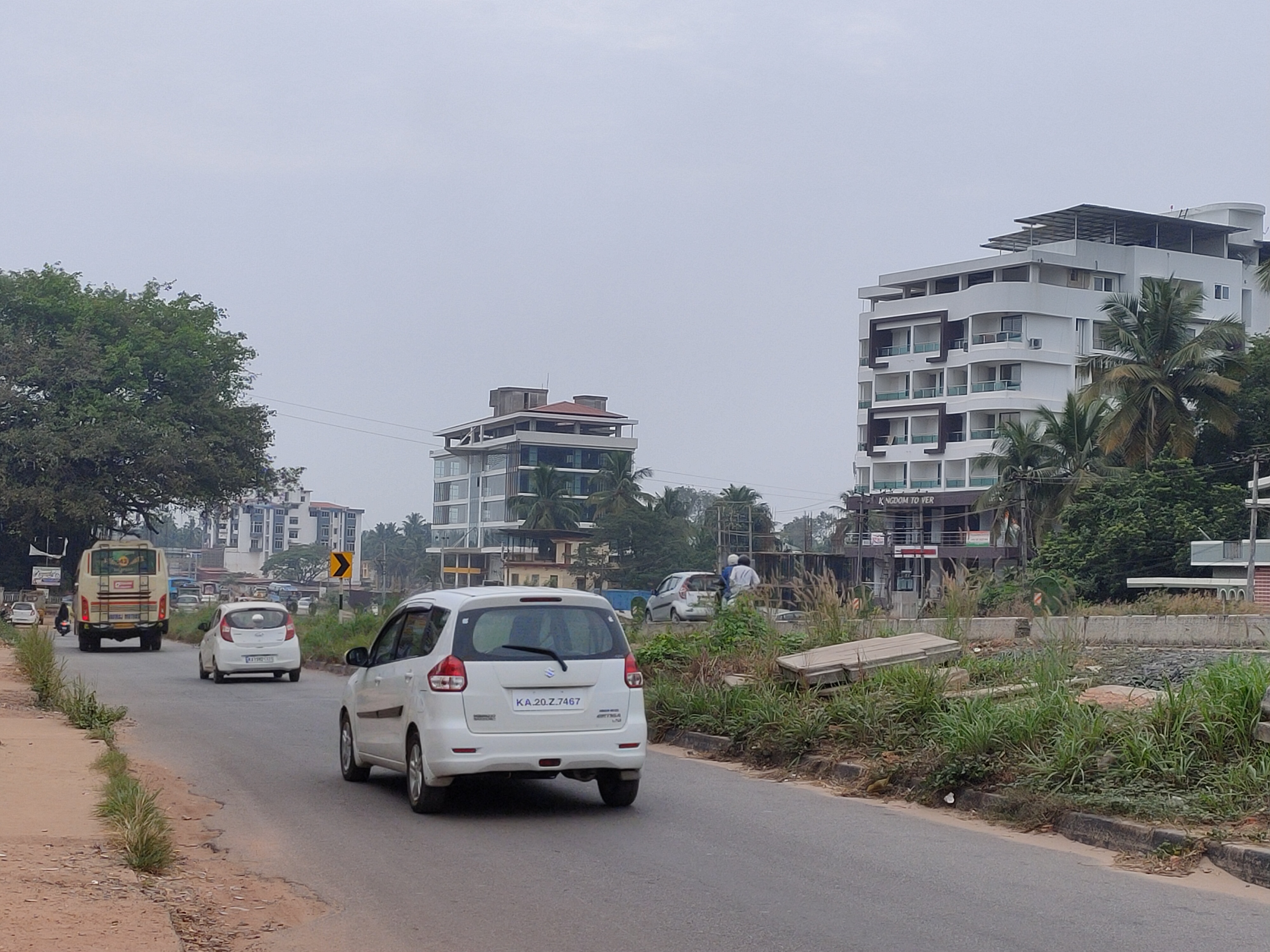
NH 66, Thokottu, Mangaluru

== Festivals ==
Thokkottu Mosaru Kudike (dahi Handi) is one of the famous festival celebrated in this place which is celebrated on the immediate day of Shri Krishna Janmashtami. Hundreds of Thousands of people will gather in the streets of Thokkottu to witness this colorful procession. Procession begins with Dahi Handi, which is followed by music bands, tableaux which are treat to eyes. Like most of the festivals in Tulu Nadu region Tiger Dance is one of the highlight of this festival.

== Schools ==
- St. Sebastian's School
- St. Sebastian's College
- Seyyid Madani School
- Mangalore One School
- Hira Girls High School
- St. Joseph's Joyland School

== Religious places ==
- Bishop Sargent Church (Protestant)
- St. Sebastian Church Permannur (Catholic)
- Shri Veera Maruthi Vyayama Shale (Gymnasium)
- Ganapathi Mandhira Over Bridge
- Vitobha Rukmaya Bajana Mandira Krishna Nagara
- Shri Vidhya Ganapathi Olapete Thokkottu

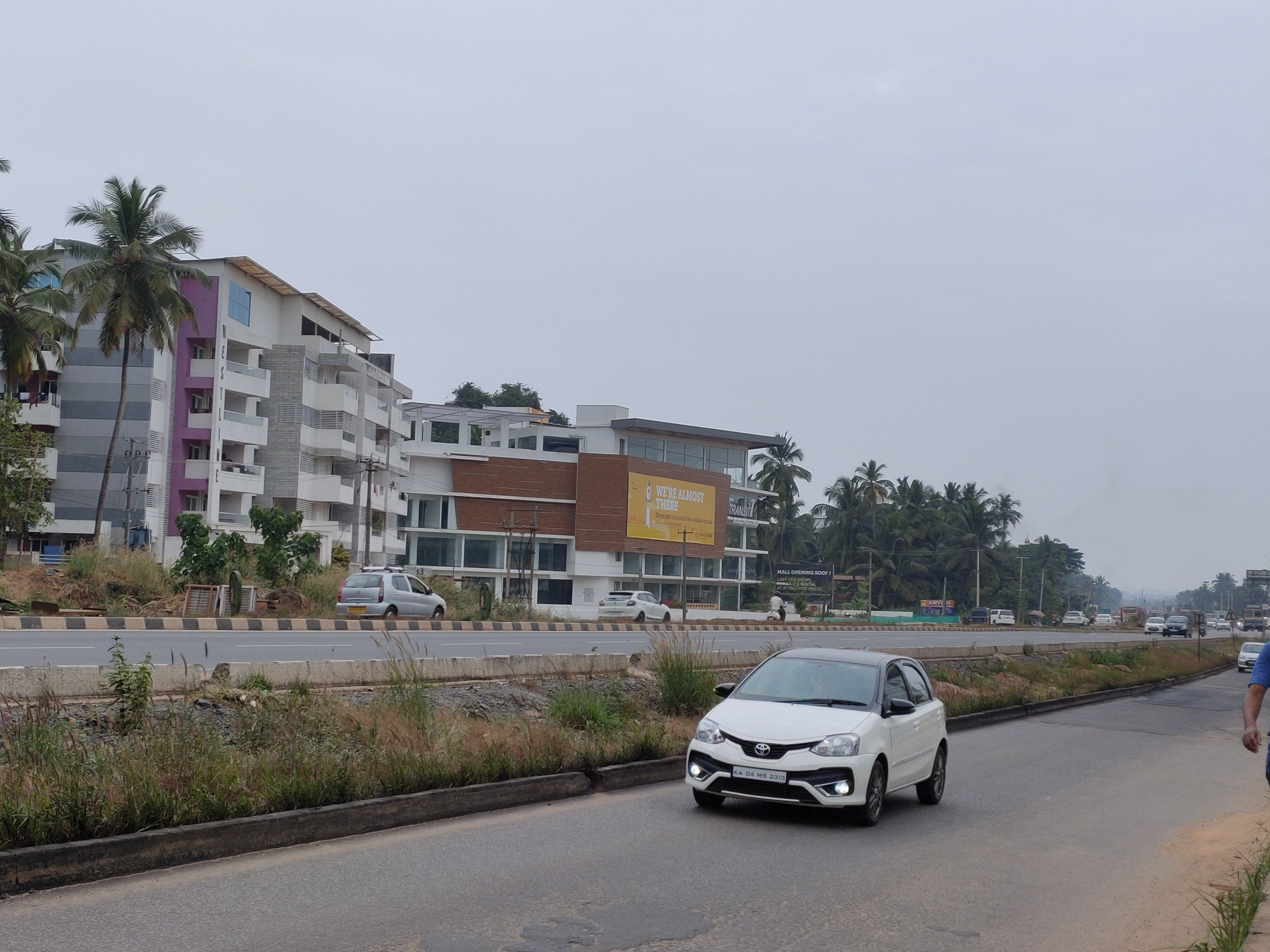
A view of Transit Mall 1, Thokottu, Mangalore

== Malls ==
- Transit Mall 1
- Unique Mall

== Banks ==
- Karnataka Bank
- Union Bank of India
- SCDCC Bank
- Federal Bank
- Axis Bank
- Vijaya Bank
- State Bank of India
- Mangalore Catholic Co-operative (M.C.C) Bank.
- St. Milages Credit Souhardha Co-Opt Bank Ltd
- Kotekar Co Operative Agricultural Bank Ltd.
- Mathrubhoomi Souhardha Sahakari Bank Ltd.

== See also ==
- Tokkottu railway station
- NITK Beach
- Panambur Beach
- Tannirbhavi Beach
- Ullal beach
- Someshwar Beach
- Pilikula Nisargadhama
- Kadri Park
- Tagore Park
- St. Aloysius Chapel
- Aloyseum
