= Prajna Chowta =

Indian conservationist, wildlife researcher, writer and filmmaker

- Born: 1970 (age 55–56); Accra, Ghana
- Occupations: Conservationist, wildlife researcher, writer and filmmaker

Prajna Chowta (born in 1970, Accra, Ghana) is an Indian conservationist, wildlife researcher, writer and filmmaker specialising in the Asian elephant. She is the co-founder and managing trustee of the Aane Mane Foundation, founded in Bangalore, India, in 2000.

== Early life ==
Prajna Chowta was born in Ghana, grew up in Nigeria and later in Bombay and Bangalore, India. She is the daughter of D. K. Chowta, a Kannada author and businessman, and the sister of music director Sandeep Chowta.

== Career ==
Prajna Chowta graduated in 1993 from the School of Oriental and African Studies SOAS, University of London, with a Masters in anthropology. She spent the last two decades in elephant camps and communities of mahouts in south and north-east India and is one of the rare women mahouts in Asia. Since 1995, she has focused on the migration of Asian elephants on the Indo-Myanmar(Burma) border; the communities and traditional techniques of mahouts in India and Burma; and the management of elephants in their natural habitat. Since 2011, she developed ElephanTTrackinG, a remote monitoring system for elephants using GPS collars currently deployed in India, Bhutan, Thailand. Prajna Chowta has recently been researching the history of the Andaman elephants.

== Awards ==
In 2016, Prajna Chowta was made Chevalier de l'Ordre National du Mérite (Knight in the National Order of Merit), by the President of the French Republic.

== Publications ==
- Chowta P., Gautier P. (2000) Hathi, l'éléphant (French) Published by Les 400 Coups, Montreal, Canada ISBN 978-2-921620-55-0
- Chowta P. (2000) The Old Elephant Route, A Research on Elephant Migration between Myanmar and India, Asian Elephant Conservation Fund Report, Fish & Wildlife Service, Washington D.C., USA
- Chowta P. (2010) Elephant Code Book, revised by S.S. Bist, R. Sukumar, B.C. Chittiappa, published by Asian Nature Conservation Foundation & Aane Mane Foundation, Bangalore, India ISBN 978-81-909731-0-6
- Chowta P., Ledoux S. (2014) Enfant d'Eléphants (French), published by Elytis Editions, France. ISBN 978-2-35639-144-5
- Chowta P. (2016) A Brief History of the Andaman Elephants, Aane Mane Foundation, India.
- Chowta P. (2022) Cultural Aberrations in the Management of Captive Elephants in The SOAS Elephant Reader, edited by Ed Emery, SOAS, London, UK. ISBN 978-0-906305-16-4

== Filmography ==
- Hathi (1998) directed by Philippe Gautier, written by Prajna Chowta and Philippe Gautier, produced by Rock Demers, Les Productions La Fête, Montréal, Québec, Canada
- The Old Elephant Route (2000) directed by Philippe Gautier, written by Prajna Chowta and Philippe Gautier, produced by Les Films d'Ici (Paris) & GA&A (Rome), Discovery Channel, USA.
- Elephas Maximus (2005) documentary trilogy directed by Philippe Gautier, written by Prajna Chowta and Philippe Gautier, Produced by Les Films d'Ici & 24images, Arte Television, France.

Episode 1: Of Elephants and Men Episode 2: Meetings with Remarkable Animals Episode 3: God and the Elephant

- Elephant Blues (2014) directed by Philippe Gautier, written by Prajna Chowta and Philippe Gautier, produced by 24images & Les Films d'Ici, France. Distributed by DigiNext, New York City.
