= Sandeep Chowta =

Indian music director

- Born: 1967 or 1968 (age 57–58); Buduburam, Ghana
- Genre: Film music
- Occupations: Music director; vocalist
- Years active: 1996–present

Sandeep Chowta (born 1967 or 1968) is an Indian music director who primarily works in Hindi cinema and Telugu cinema. He is also the head of Columbia Records in India. He has also lent his voice for some of his songs.

In 2003, he produced an anti substance abuse documentary, titled Dead End, which entered into numerous film festivals. This was produced by seventeen-year-old college student and drug activist, Tanya Khubchandani.

In 2004 Chowta invited Jay Oliver and Richard Gannaway of the world/new age musical group, AO Music (also known as AO), to his Mumbai studio, and has since become one of the group's core members. AO Music also features Miriam Stockley, the voice of Karl Jenkins' Adiemus project, and children's choral ensembles from around the globe. AO Music album releases crediting Chowta have charted in the top five internationally since 2009.

He has composed music for 12 Tollywood films.

== Early life ==
Chowta was born in Ghana, grew up in Nigeria and later moved to Bangalore, India. He is the son of D. K. Chowta, a Tulu author and businessman hailing from the Bunt community. His younger sister is ethnographer Prajna Chowta.

== Discography ==
Year	Film	Score	Songs	Language	Notes
1996	Ninne Pelladata	Yes	Yes	Telugu	
1996	Daraar	Yes	No	Hindi	
1996	Sanam	Yes	Yes	Hindi	
1997	Dus	Yes	Yes	Hindi	Soundtrack released; Film unreleased
1997	Bhai	Yes	No	Hindi	
1997	Insaaf: The Final Justice	Yes	Yes	Hindi	
1998	Chandralekha	Yes	Yes	Telugu	
1998	Nidhi	Yes	Yes	Telugu	
1998	Satya	Yes	No	Hindi	
1998	Shanti Shanti Shanti	Yes	Yes	Kannada	
1999	Prema Katha	Yes	Yes	Hindi	
1999	Kaun	Yes	No	Hindi	
1999	Vaastav: The Reality	Yes	No	Hindi	
1999	Mast	Yes	Yes	Hindi	
1999	Shool	Yes	No	Hindi	
2000	Gang	Yes	No	Hindi	
2000	Jungle	Yes	Yes	Hindi	
2000	Dhadkan	Yes	No	Hindi	
2001	Pyaar Tune Kya Kiya	Yes	Yes	Hindi	
2001	Asoka	Yes	No	Hindi	
2002	Durga: It's Not Just A Love Story	Yes	Yes	Hindi	
2002	Yeh Kaisi Mohabbat	Yes	Yes	Hindi	
2002	Company	Yes	Yes	Hindi	
2002	Jaani Dushman: Ek Anokhi Kahani	Yes	No	Hindi	
2002	Bollywood/Hollywood	Yes	Yes	Hindi	
2002	Road	Yes	Yes	Hindi	
2003	Dum	Yes	Yes	Hindi	
2003	Samay: When Time Strikes	Yes	No	Hindi	
2003	Boom	Yes	Yes	Hindi	
2004	Musafir	Yes	No	Hindi	
2004	Ranga SSLC	Yes	Yes	Kannada	
2004	Rakht	Yes	No	Hindi	
2005	Super	Yes	Yes	Telugu	
2005	Sri	Yes	Yes	Telugu	
2005	Political Rowdy	Yes	Yes	Telugu	
2006	Sandwich	Yes	Yes	Hindi	
2006	Cyanide	Yes	No	Kannada	
2007	Om Shanti Om	Yes	No	Hindi	
2008	Bujjigadu	Yes	Yes	Telugu	
2008	Thoda Pyaar Thoda Magic	Yes	No	Hindi	
2008	Mukhbiir	Yes	Yes	Hindi	
2009	Josh	Yes	Yes	Telugu	
2009	Saleem	Yes	Yes	Telugu	
2010	Kedi	Yes	Yes	Telugu	
2010	Deadend	Yes	Yes	Hindi	Short film
2010	Thamassu	Yes	Yes	Kannada	
2010	Housefull	Yes	No	Hindi	
2011	Not A Love Story	Yes	No	Hindi	
2012	Bhoot Returns	Yes	No	Hindi	
2012	Attahasa	Yes	Yes	Kannada	
2012	Rowdy Rathore	Yes	No	Hindi	
2013	Saheb, Biwi Aur Gangster Returns	Yes	Yes	Hindi	
2013	R... Rajkumar	Yes	No	Hindi	
2014	Khwaabb	Yes	Yes	Hindi	
2014	Elephant Blues	Yes	No	Hindi	
2014	The Shaukeens	Yes	No	Hindi	
2014	Action Jackson	Yes	Yes	Hindi	
2015	Rajathandhiram	Yes	No	Tamil	
2015	Gabbar Is Back	Yes	No	Hindi	
2015	Courier Boy Kalyan	Yes	No	Telugu	
2016	Tamilselvanum Thaniyar Anjalum	Yes	No	Tamil	
2018	Mehbooba	Yes	Yes	Telugu	
2020	Ranchi	Yes	No	Kannada	
2020	Sadak 2	Yes	No	Hindi	
2025	Haq	Yes	No	Hindi	

== Album Discography ==
- Matters of The Heart - Jazz Album
- The Immersive Experience - New Age EP
- Re-Enter the Dragon - Pop Single
- The Arrival - Progressive Rock Single
- From The Cinematic Vault Vol. 1 - New Age Album
- From The Cinematic Vault Vol. 2 - New Age Album
- From The Cinematic Vault Vol. 3 - New Age Album
- From The Cinematic Vault Vol. 4 - New Age Album
- From The Cinematic Vault Vol. 5 - New Age Album
- From The Cinematic Vault Vol. 6 - New Age Album
- From The Cinematic Vault Vol. 7 - New Age Album
- From The Cinematic Vault Vol. 8 - New Age Album
- From The Cinematic Vault Vol. 9 - New Age Album
- Boom / The Lost Files - New Age Album
- Chalk & Cheeze - Electronic Dance Music Album
- 560001 by Peepal Tree & Sandeep Chowta - Kannada Pop/Rock Album
- Re-Laxman Vol. 1 by Tony Das & Sandeep Chowta - Lounge/Pop/Easy Listening Music Album
- Re-Laxman Vol. 2 by Tony Das & Sandeep Chowta - Lounge/Pop/Easy Listening Music Album
- Venu - Carnatic Classical Fusion Music Album
- Mallika I Hate You - Hindi Album
- Mitti- Hindi Album
- Now That's Sandeep Chowta- Hindi Album
- Alisha Alisha- Hindi Album
- Viva - Hindi Album
- Mila- Hindi Album

== Band/Ensemble Discography ==
- Aomusic – Twirl 2009 (contributing producer)
- Aomusic – ...and Love Rages on! 2011 (contributing producer)
- Aomusic – Hokulea 2013 (contributing producer)
