= Malali =

Malali ಮಳಲಿ ಮಳಲಿ ಗ್ರಾಮ
- Village
- Nickname(s): ನಮ್ಮ ಮಳಲಿ, 'our garden'
- Location in Karnataka, India Malali (India)
- Coordinates: 16.3360°N 75.20553°E
- Country: India
- State: Karnataka
- District: Bagalkot
- Talukas: Mudhol

Government
  - Type: Panchayat raj
  - Body: Gram panchayat

Population (2001)
  - Total: 5,362

Languages
  - Official: Kannada
- Time zone: UTC+5:30 (IST)
- PIN: 571502
- ISO 3166 code: IN-KA
- Vehicle registration: KA
- Nearest city: Mudhol
- Lok Sabha constituency: Bagalkot Lokashaba
- Vidhan Sabha constituency: Mudhol Vidhanashaba
- Website: karnataka.gov.in

Malali is a village in Bagalkot district, Karnataka, India.

== Demographics ==
As of the 2011 Census of India there were 345 households in Malali and a total population of 1,781 consisting of 912 males and 869 females. There were 177 children ages 0–6.

== See also ==
- Bagalkot
- Districts of Karnataka
