= Mangaluru taluk =

Mangaluru Taluk
- Taluk
- Location in Karnataka, India Mangaluru Taluk (India)
- Coordinates: 12.87°N 74.85°E
- Country: India
- State: Karnataka
- District: Dakshina Kannada
- Region: Tulunaad (South Canara)
- Headquarters: Mangaluru

Government
  - Type: Panchayat raj

Area
  - Total: 834 km^{2} (322 sq mi)

Population (2011)
  - Total: 994,602
  - Density: 1,190/km^{2} (3,090/sq mi)

Languages
  - Official: Kannada
- Time zone: UTC+5:30 (IST)
- Postal code: 5750xx
- ISO 3166 code: IN-KA
- Vehicle registration: KA 19
- Website: karnataka.gov.in

Mangaluru taluk is a taluk (subdistrict) in the Dakshina Kannada district, Karnataka on the western coast of India. Mangaluru is the administrative headquarters of the taluk. It is made up of Mangaluru City Corporation, Ullal City Municipal Council that govern the Mangaluru Urban Agglomeration, Other than these there are forty-nine panchayat villages in Mangalore taluk. It covers an area of 834 square kilometres (322 sq mi). Mangaluru, Ullal and Moodabidri are the top 3 highly populated towns.

Languages in Mangaluru Taluk (1951)
1. Tulu (54.6%)
2. Malayalam (21.2%)
3. Konkani (17.3%)
4. Others (6.90%)

== See also ==
- Economy of Mangaluru
- Swami Vivekananda Planetarium
