= Puthige, Dakshina Kannada =

Puthige, Udupi Puthige
- village
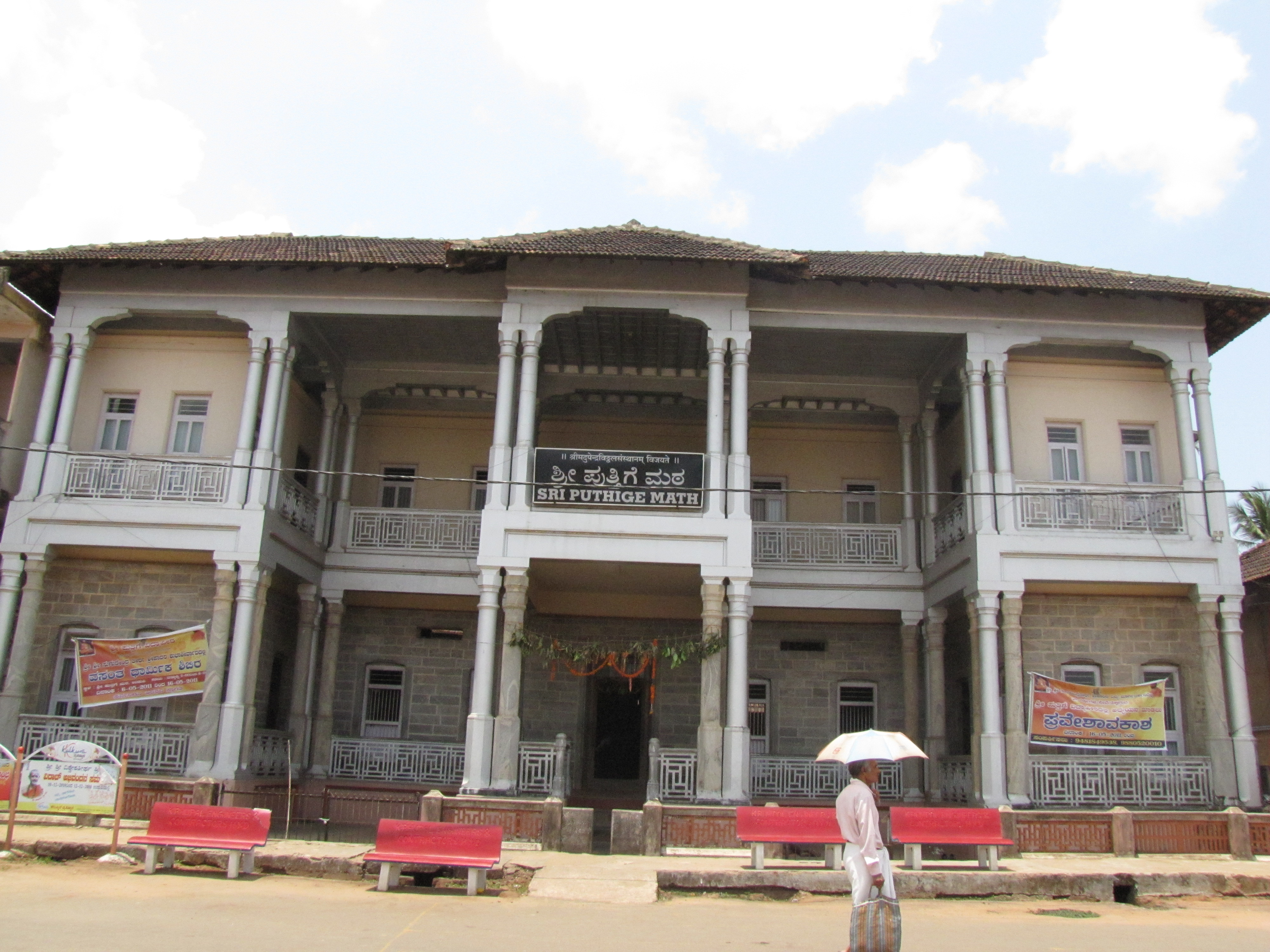
- Sri Puthige Math, Udupi
- Interactive map of Puthige, Udupi
- Coordinates: 12.87°N 74.84°E
- Country: India
- State: Karnataka
- District: Udupi
- Talukas: Udupi

Government
  - Body: Gram panchayat

Population (2001)
  - Total: 7,535

Languages
- Time zone: UTC+5:30 (IST)
- ISO 3166 code: IN-KA
- Vehicle registration: KA
- Website: karnataka.gov.in

Puthige is a village in the southern state of Karnataka, India.

== Demographics ==
As of 2001 India census, Puthige had a population of 7535 with 3608 males and 3927 females.

== Prominent people from Puthige ==
- Abdussalam Puthige, the Editor-in-Chief of Varthabharathi

== See also ==
- Udupi
- Udupi
- Districts of Karnataka
