= Ullal =

City in Karnataka, India

- City
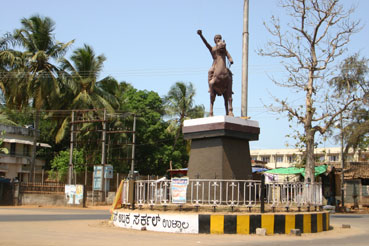
- Ullal Abbakkadevi Circle
- Ullal in Karnataka
- Coordinates: 12.8149°N 74.8429°E
- Country: India
- State: Karnataka
- District: Dakshina Kannada

Government
  - Type: City Municipal Council
  - Body: Ullal City Municipal Council
  - Council President: K.Hussain Alias Kunhimonu

Area
  - Total: 11.8 km^{2} (4.6 sq mi)
- Elevation: 5 m (16 ft)

Population (2011)
  - Total: 53,808
  - Density: 4,560/km^{2} (11,800/sq mi)
- Time zone: UTC+5:30 (IST)
- PIN: 575020
- Vehicle registration: KA 19
- Official language: Kannada,,Tulu
- Length of Roads: 268.97 km
- Lok Sabha constituency: Dakshina Kannada
- Vidhan Sabha constituency: Mangalore
- Literacy: 92.87%
- Website: www.ullalcity.mrc.gov.in

Ullal or Uḷḷāla is a City in Dakshina Kannada district of Karnataka state in India. Ullal City Municipal Council along with the Mangaluru City Corporation forms the continuous Mangaluru urban agglomeration area which is currently the fourth biggest in Karnataka after Bengaluru, Mysore and Hubli-Dharwad. There is also a plan to merge Ullal City Municipality & some gram panchayats along with Mangaluru City Corporation to form the Greater Mangalore region. Ullal is one of the oldest towns in India. In the 15th century it came under the rule of the Portuguese. Still the remains of its glorious history can be seen in the beaches and other parts of Ullal. It is very famous for historic locations like Sri Cheerumba Bagavathi Temple, Someshwara Temple, Someshwar Beach, Summer Sands Beach Resort, Queen Abbakka Chowta's Fort at Ranipura, K Pandyarajah Ballal Institutes and college of nursing, St. Sebastian Church Permannur, Fish Meal & Oil Plant, and Queen Abbakka's Jain temple at Melangadi.

The town, located on the Arabian Sea, was the setting for wide-scale sea-erosion that occurred in the late 1990s and early this millennium. The local authorities, however, have tried to reduce the damage by placing sand bags near the advancing coastline, the benefits of this step are yet to be noted, Ullal is the first "Kerosene Free" city in the state of Karnataka. This town is an important trading centre for fish and fish manure. Fishing and Beedi rolling are main occupations of the residents of this town.

== History ==
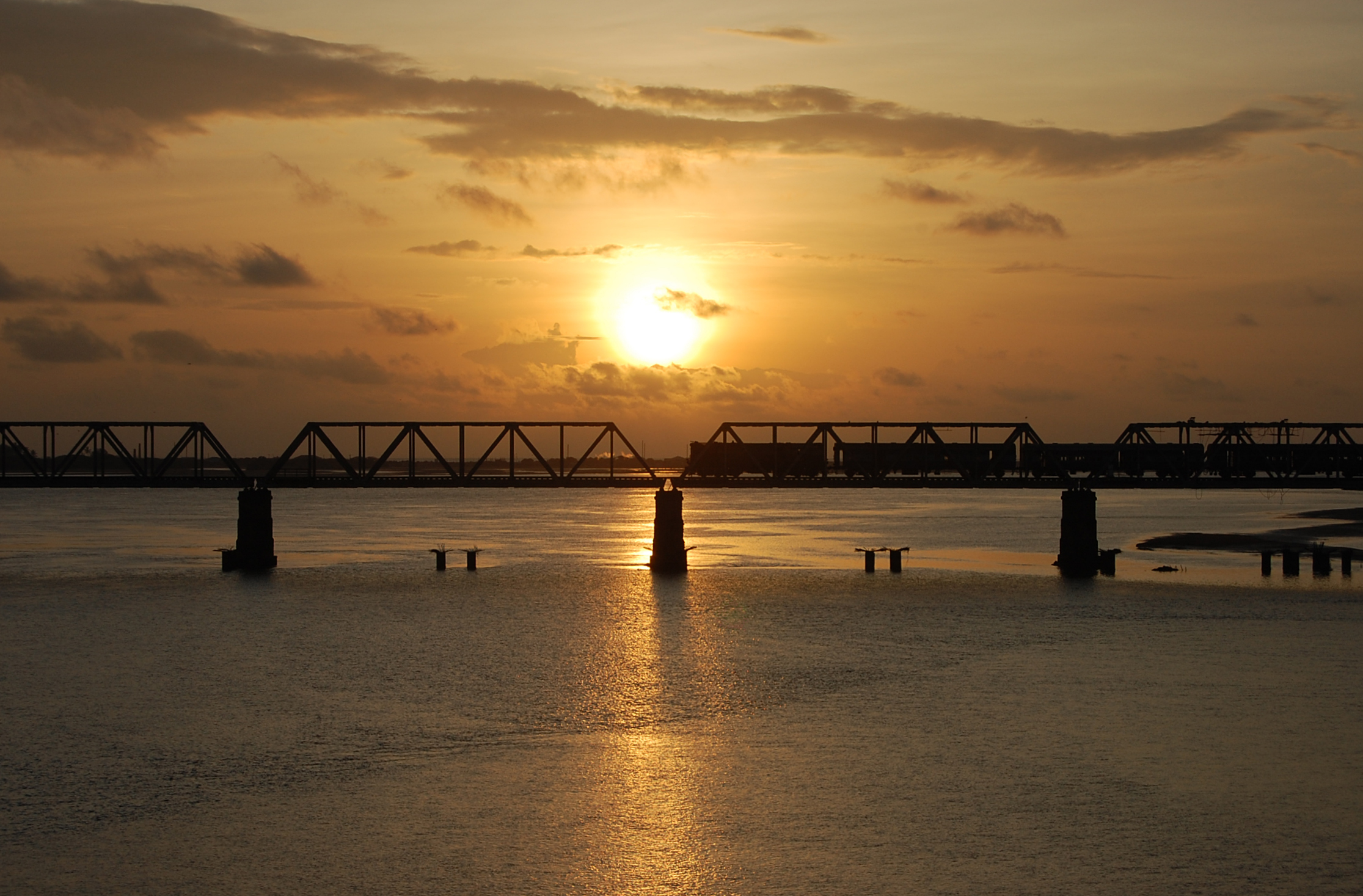
The popular Ullal Bridge, Mangalore

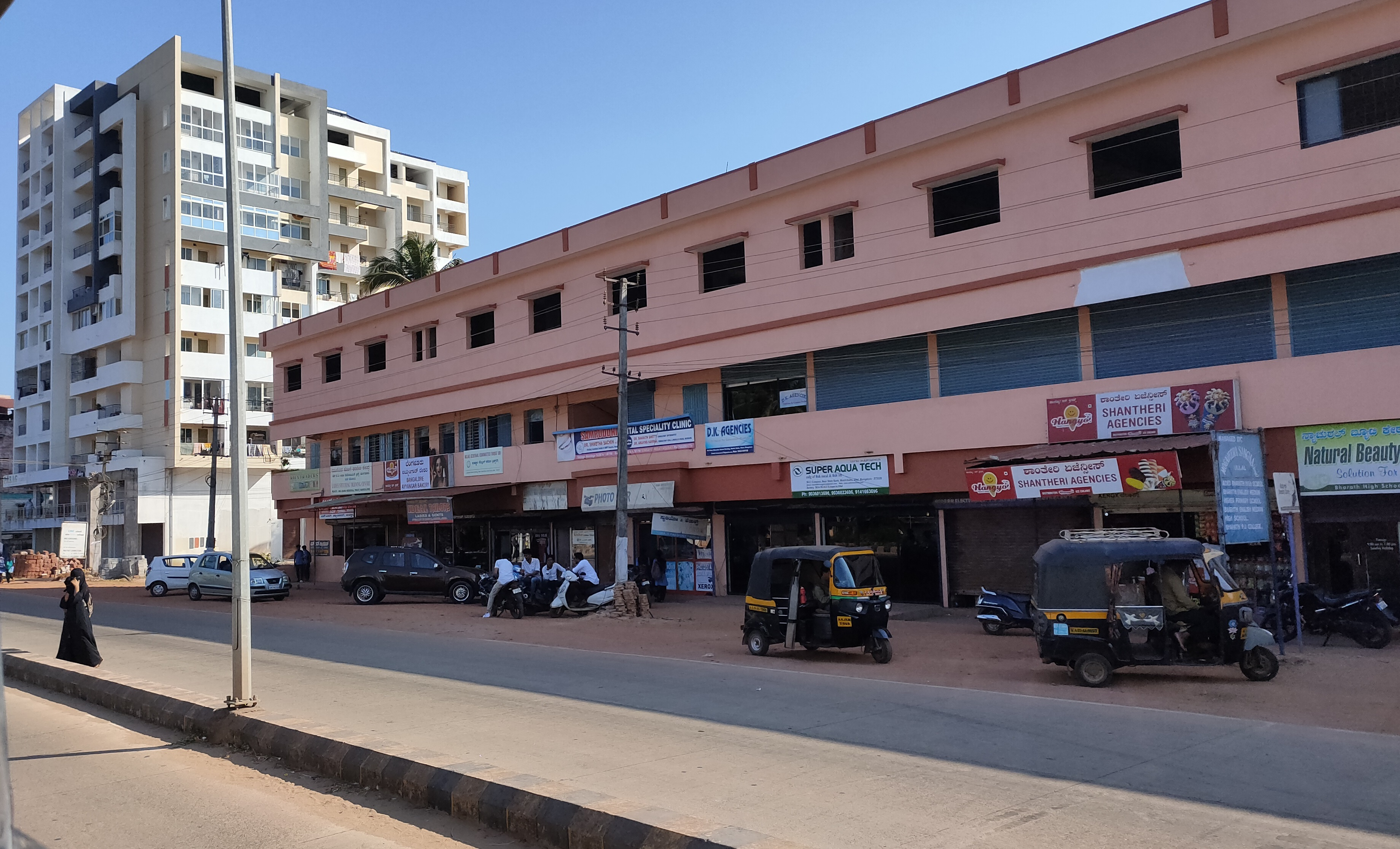
Ullal – Thokottu Road, Mangalore

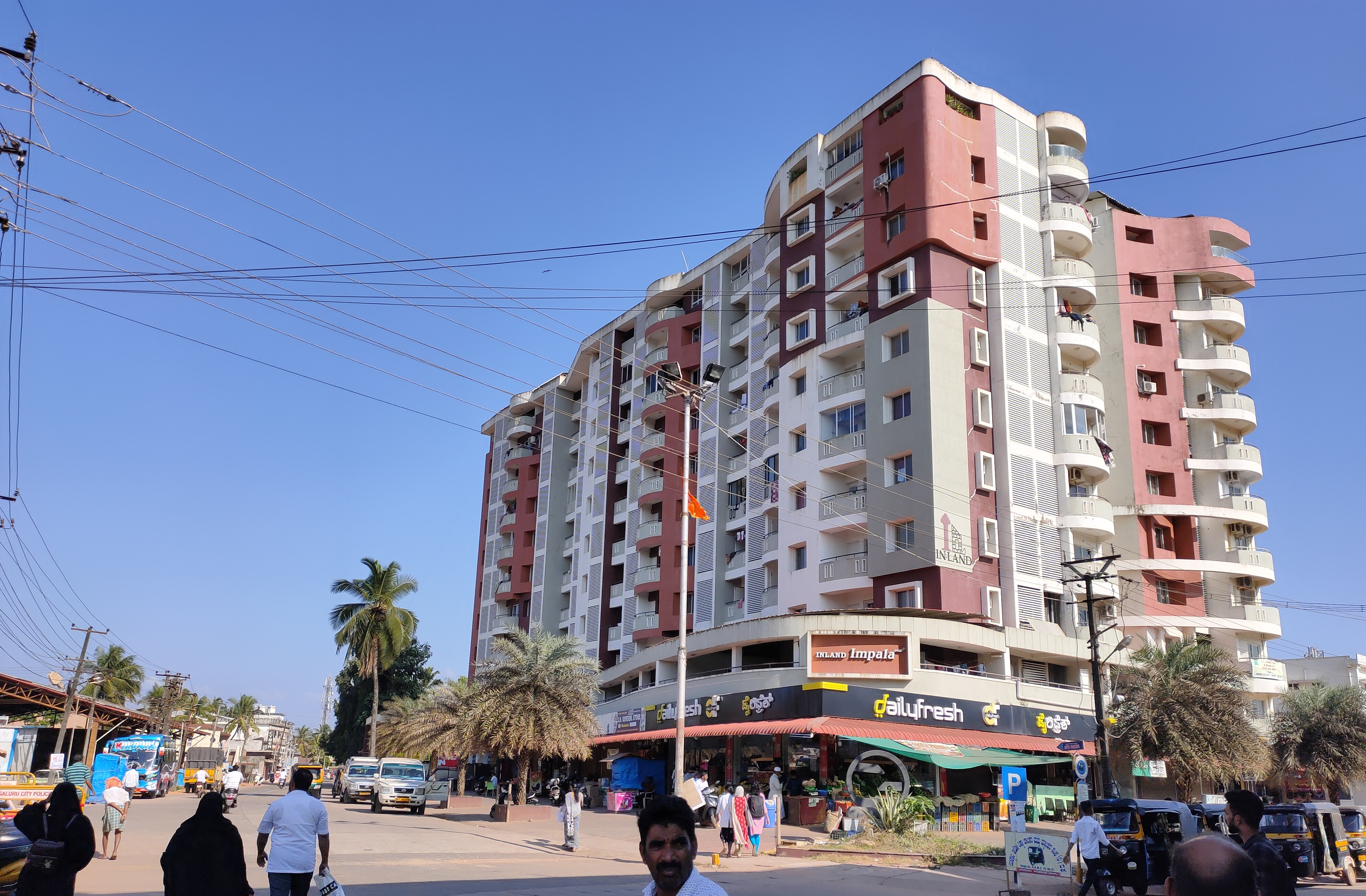
Ullal highrise buildings, Mangalore

This town was the subsidiary capital of the Chowta rulers and was ruled by Jain Queen, Abbakka Chowta in the middle of the 16th century.

Abbakka Chowta of Ullal can perhaps be proclaimed the first promoter of women's liberation. A regular firebrand, the people of Ullal look upon her with much pride. A Jain princess of 16th century, she came to the throne on the death of her sister. She was married to the King of Mangalore, but the marriage was not a success. In a few years the couple was estranged with the queen returning to her beloved Ullal. The reason for the grouse was, the queen was averse to the payment of subsidy demanded by the Portuguese. While her husband continued to be subservient to them, the queen was openly rebellious. Relations between the royal couple steadily worsened and finally ended with divorce, with the queen returning all the jewels to her ex-husband. War was declared and the queen was captured while on a sailing expedition on the Nethravathi. Taken prisoner she was presented before her husband. However, on this one occasion the queen thought discretion the better part of valour and with all her womanly charms got the Banga Arasa (King) to set her free and return all her lands to her. The Raja went so far as to avow his eternal friendship to her. But hardly had she reached the precincts of her own kingdom then she vowed to wage war on her husband once more.

For this she sought the help of the powerful Raja of Bednore. The Banga Raja had meanwhile enlisted the help of the Portuguese to subjugate his wife. The Raja of Bednore being an opportunist was only too ready to enter the fray. The Banga-Portuguese alliance was defeated with the Banga Fort razed to the ground. The queen had to part with the fertile tract of land at Berdatte to the Bednore King for his support.

Having successfully defeated her husband, the queen now turned her attention to the Portuguese with whom she maintained her unconciliatory attitude. Several punitive expeditions were sent against her, which she repulsed successfully with the help of the Zamorin of Calicut. Another expedition sent under João Peixoto in 1566 ended in disaster for the Portuguese. The queen along with Chennappa Mogaveera (Gurikara) as commander-in-chief and Mogaveera warriors she surrounded the Portuguese frigate at night. She took them by surprise and inflicted a crushing defeat on them. Incensed by the defeat made all the more insulting at the hands of a woman, the Portuguese sent a veritable armada under the leadership of the Portuguese Governor himself. While the queen met with initial success, she was betrayed, so some say, by her own people for a casket of silver. However, the army of the queen was thoroughly outnumbered. What ensured was a bloody massacre with the queen escaping to the hills, a fugitive. Another version has it that the queen had killed herself rather than give herself up to the enemy which really seems more in keeping with her character.

Pietro Della Valle, a renowned traveller and historian of the 16th century, seems to have been fascinated by her. Her militant nature aroused his interest and he made several attempts to meet her. His efforts finally met with success when he accidentally came across her in the bazaar. His foreign mein and dress elicited her interest and with the aid of an interpreter, courtesies were exchanged and an invitation issued to visit the royal palace.

Della Valle was enamoured of "her perfect dignity, handsome feature and exemplary assiduity. Active and vigorous in actions of war and weighty affairs. Even at night she was not free to take rest but dispensed justice to her people." His description of her is at once romantic and realistic. He puts her age down at 40, dark complexioned and with elegant figure. At another instance, he says she could be mistaken for a common kitchen wench, but for her graceful and judicious speech. Her scanty clothing of only a loincloth may have created this impression. He seems highly impressed with her administrative qualities and doesn't give much credence to the rumours of her having poisoned her elder two sons, who were aspiring to the throne.

One can see the ruins of the fort she built around Somanatheshwara temple. This temple houses few things related to the Abbakka Chowta. There is an old Jain temple (basadi) in the town which belonged to the queen. Ullal was one of the major ports of the western coast in the pre-colonial era.

== Civic Administration ==
Ullal City Municipality is the second biggest Governing body after Mangaluru City Corporation in Mangalore Urban Agglomeration.

Ullal was formed as a Nagara Panchayat in 1996. Later Town Municipal Council was formed in 2006. And was then upgraded to City Municipality in 2014.

== Geography ==
Ullal is located at 12.8°N 74.85°E. It has an average elevation of 5 metres (16 ft).

== Climate ==
Climate data for Ullal, India
Month	Jan	Feb	Mar	Apr	May	Jun	Jul	Aug	Sep	Oct	Nov	Dec	Year
Record high °C (°F)	36.3 (97.3)	37.8 (100.0)	38.1 (100.6)	36.6 (97.9)	36.7 (98.1)	34.4 (93.9)	35.5 (95.9)	32.2 (90.0)	34.6 (94.3)	35.0 (95.0)	35.6 (96.1)	35.6 (96.1)	38.1 (100.6)
Mean daily maximum °C (°F)	32.8 (91.0)	33.0 (91.4)	33.5 (92.3)	34.0 (93.2)	33.3 (91.9)	29.7 (85.5)	28.2 (82.8)	28.4 (83.1)	29.5 (85.1)	30.9 (87.6)	32.3 (90.1)	32.8 (91.0)	31.5 (88.7)
Mean daily minimum °C (°F)	20.8 (69.4)	21.8 (71.2)	23.6 (74.5)	25.0 (77.0)	25.1 (77.2)	23.4 (74.1)	22.9 (73.2)	23.0 (73.4)	23.1 (73.6)	23.1 (73.6)	22.4 (72.3)	21.2 (70.2)	22.9 (73.2)
Record low °C (°F)	16.1 (61.0)	17.3 (63.1)	18.8 (65.8)	19.7 (67.5)	20.4 (68.7)	20.5 (68.9)	19.8 (67.6)	19.4 (66.9)	20.2 (68.4)	19.1 (66.4)	15.9 (60.6)	16.1 (61.0)	15.9 (60.6)
Average rainfall mm (inches)	1.1 (0.04)	0.2 (0.01)	2.9 (0.11)	24.4 (0.96)	183.2 (7.21)	1,027.2 (40.44)	1,200.4 (47.26)	787.3 (31.00)	292.1 (11.50)	190.8 (7.51)	70.9 (2.79)	16.4 (0.65)	3,796.9 (149.48)
Average rainy days	0.2	0	0.3	1.6	7	23.5	27.4	24.9	13.7	9.1	3.6	0.6	111.9
Average relative humidity (%)	62	66	68	71	71	87	89	88	85	79	73	65	75
Mean monthly sunshine hours	313	296	299	292	276	119	94	133	178	226	271	292	2,789
Source: Weather of Ullal, India by AccuWeather

== Work Profile ==
Out of total population, 20,979 were engaged in work or business activity. Of this 14,766 were males while 6,213 were females. In census survey, worker is defined as person who does business, job, service, and cultivator and labour activity. Of total 20979 working population, 96.19% were engaged in Main Work while 3.81% of total workers were engaged in Marginal Work.

== Demographic ==
Religion in Ullal City

source:Ullal City Census 2011 data
1. Muslim (61.1%)
2. Hindu (29.6%)
3. Christian (9.34%)
4. Sikhs (0.01%)
5. Jains (0.01%)
6. Buddhist (0.02%)
7. Not Stated (0.03%)

According to 2011 Census, Muslims form 61.10%, Hindus form 29.59% and Christians form 9.34% of the Population.

Population of Children with age of 0–6 is 6278 which is 11.68% of total population of Ullal (CMC). In Ullal City Municipal Council, the female sex ratio is 1025 against state average of 973. Moreover, the child sex ratio in Ullal is around 944 compared to Karnataka state average of 948. The literacy rate of Ullal city is 92.87% higher than the state average of 75.36%. In Ullal, male literacy is around 96.42% while the female literacy rate is 89.45%.

Ullal City Municipal Council has total administration over 9,588 houses to which it supplies basic amenities like water and sewerage. It is also authorize to build roads within City Municipal Council limits and impose taxes on properties coming under its jurisdiction.

Schedule Caste (SC) constitutes 1.67% while Schedule Tribe (ST) were 0.49% of total population in Ullal (CMC).

== Media ==
Ullal based local television channels include Posa Kural News, Abbakka TV, CCN TV, STAR OF KUDLA CCN LIVE, CCN NEWS, DAIL TV etc.

== See also ==
- Rani Abbakka of Ullal
- Thokottu
- U. T. Khader
- Ullal City Municipal
