= Nandavara =

- town
- Location in Karnataka, India
- Coordinates: 12.864816°N 75.039539°E
- Country: India
- State: Karnataka

Languages
  - Official: Kannada
- Time zone: UTC+5:30 (IST)

Nandavara is a village near the town of Bantwal, in Dakshina Kannada, Karnataka, India. It is located around 25 km from Mangalore, on the banks of the Netravati River.

== History ==
Nandavara is an ancient settlement and a political center historically. Nandavara was the capital of the Nanda Dynasty, which ruled the neighboring region for several centuries.Nandavara once had royal associations: there were many palaces and temples in the area. None, nor the fort built by the kings, survive today. Nandavar was a very ancient and renowned place. For centuries it was also a historical center. Nandavara was the capital of the Nanda Dynasty, which ruled this region for several centuries. The name Nandavara is derived from a combination of two words, nanda and pura. The Nanda kings established their kingdom on the bank of the Netravati River, and built a fort and a palace. The place came to be known as Nandapura, which in course of time became well known by the present name of Nandavara.

Sites of historical significance that exist today include the Sri Veerabhadra shrine, the Shri Vinayaka Shankaranarayana Durgamba temple and the Sri Veera Maruti temple.

== Etymology ==
The name Nandavara is derived from a combination of two words, nanda and pura. The Nanda kings established their kingdom on the bank of the Netravati River, and built a fort and a palace. The place came to be known as Nandapura, which in course became well-known by the present name of Nandavara.
