= Without You =

Without You may refer to:

== Music ==
=== Albums ===
- Without You (Karen Mok album), 2006
- Without You (Sami Yusuf album), 2009
- Without You (EP), by Lauv, 2020

=== Songs ===
==== Before 1980 ====
- "Without You" (Johnny Tillotson song), 1961
- "Without You" (Badfinger song), 1970, covered by Harry Nilsson, Shirley Bassey, Air Supply, T. G. Sheppard, and other artists
  - "Without You" (Mariah Carey recording), Mariah Carey's rendition of the song, 1993
- "Without You", from the musical My Fair Lady, 1956
- "Without You", by Cliff Richard from 21 Today, 1961
- "Without You", by Manfred Mann from Manfred Mann's Cock-a-Hoop, 1964
- "Without You", by Crispian St. Peters from Follow Me..., 1966
- "Without You", by Fleetwood Mac, written by Danny Kirwan, from Then Play On, 1969
- "Without You", by Paul Revere & the Raiders, B-side to the single "Mr. Sun, Mr. Moon", 1969
- "Without You", by the Doobie Brothers from The Captain and Me, 1973
- "Without You", by Janis Ian from Stars, 1974
- "Without You (There Ain't No Love at All)", by Yvonne Elliman from Love Me, 1977
- "Without You", by Lynsey De Paul from Tigers and Fireflies, 1979

==== 1980s ====
- "Without You" (David Bowie song), 1983
- "Without You" (Peabo Bryson and Regina Belle song), 1987
- "Without You" (George Lamond song), 1989
- "Without You" (Mötley Crüe song), 1989
- "Without You (Not Another Lonely Night)", by Franke and the Knockouts, 1982
- "Without You", by the Marshall Tucker Band from Tenth, 1980
- "Without You", by Asia from Asia, 1982
- "Without You", by Eurogliders from Pink Suit Blue Day, 1982
- "Without You", by Chaz Jankel from Chazablanca, 1983
- "Without You", by Gordon Lightfoot from Salute, 1983

==== 1990s ====
- "Without You" (Debbie Gibson song), 1990
- "Without You" (Sqeezer song), 1998
- "Without You" (Van Halen song), 1998
- "Without You" (Dixie Chicks song), 1999
- "Without You" (Girlfriend song), 1992
- "Without You", by Giant from Time to Burn, 1992
- "Without You", by All-4-One from All-4-One, 1994
- "Without You", by Bruce Springsteen from Blood Brothers, 1996
- "Without You", from the musical Rent, 1996
- "Without You", by Bic Runga from Drive, 1997
- "Without You", by Samantha Cole, 1997
- "Without You", by Corey Hart from Jade, 1998
- "Without You", by Nicole Wray from the Why Do Fools Fall in Love film soundtrack, 1998
- "Without You", by Angie Stone from Black Diamond, 1999
- "Without You", by Lenny Kravitz from 5, 1999 reissue

==== 2000s ====
- "Without You" (Charlie Wilson song), 2000
- "Without You" (Silverchair song), 2002
- "Without You" (Brooke Fraser song), 2005
- "Without You" (El Presidente song), 2005
- "Without You" (The Feeling song), 2008
- "Without You" (Hinder song), 2008
- "Without You" (Empire of the Sun song), 2009
- "Without You", by Jagged Edge from Jagged Little Thrill, 2001
- "Without You", by Vision of Disorder from From Bliss to Devastation, 2001
- "Without You", by Blue, written by Lee Ryan, Mark Hall, and Conner Reeves, from One Love, 2002
- "Without You", by Busted from Busted, 2002
- "Without You", by Donna de Lory from Songs 95, 2002
- "Without You", by Laura Pausini from From the Inside, 2002
- "Without You", by Default from Elocation, 2003
- "Without You", by Re-union, representing Netherlands in the Eurovision Song Contest 2004
- "Without You", by Dogzilla, 2005
- "Without You", by Third Day from Wherever You Are, 2005
- "Without You", by Yoshiki from Eternal Melody II, 2005
- "Without You", by Ayọ from Joyful, 2006
- "Without You", by Christina Aguilera from Back to Basics, 2006
- "Without You", by Mad Caddies from Keep It Going, 2007
- "Without You", by Social Code from Social-Code, 2007
- "Without You", by Kevin Rudolf from In the City, 2008
- "Without You", by Mark Gormley, 2008
- "Without You", by Bury Your Dead from It's Nothing Personal, 2009
- "Without You", by Breaking Benjamin from Dear Agony, 2009
- "Without You", by Erika Jayne from Pretty Mess, 2009
- "Without You", by Pixie Lott from Turn It Up, 2009
- "Without You", by Three Days Grace from Life Starts Now, 2009

==== 2010s ====
- "Without You" (Jyongri song), 2010
- "Without You" (Keith Urban song), 2010
- "Without You" (David Guetta song), 2011
- "Without You" (Monica song), 2012
- "Without You" (Blue song), written by Wayne Hector, Mich Hansen, Jason Gill, Daniel Davidsen, Lee Ryan, Duncan James, Antony Costa, and Simon Webbe, 2013
- "Without You" (Junior Sanchez song), 2014
- "Without You" (NCT U song), 2016
- "Without You" (Avicii song), 2017
- "Without You" (John Newman and Nina Nesbitt song), 2019
- "Without You", by Falco from Falco 3, 2010 reissue
- "Without You", by Keke Wyatt from Who Knew?, 2010
- "Without You", by My Darkest Days from My Darkest Days, 2010
- "Without You", by We Are the Fallen from Tear the World Down, 2010
- "Without You", by Eddie Vedder from Ukulele Songs, 2011
- "Without You", by Ashes Remain from What I've Become, 2011
- "Without You", by Brandy Norwood from Two Eleven, 2012
- "Without You", by Lana Del Rey from Born to Die, 2012
- "Without You", by Y'akoto, co-written by Tom Hugo, 2012
- "Without You", by Dillon Francis and Totally Enormous Extinct Dinosaurs, 2013
- "Without You", by Fleetwood Mac, written by Stevie Nicks, from Extended Play, 2013
- "Without You", by Jeremy Camp from Reckless, 2013
- "Without You", by For King & Country from Run Wild. Live Free. Love Strong., 2014
- "Without You", by Lil Wayne featuring Bibi Bourelly from Free Weezy Album, 2015
- "Without You", by Oh Wonder from Oh Wonder, 2015
- "Without You", by Anderson Paak from Malibu, 2016
- "Without You", by Marcus & Martinus from Together, 2016
- "Without You", by the Rua, 2016
- "Without You", by Andra featuring David Bisbal, 2016
- "Without You", by Rachel Platten from Waves, 2017
- "Without You", by Shouse, 2017
- "Without You", by Slander & Kayzo from Dilapidation Celebration, 2017
- "Without You", by X Japan from We Are X, 2017
- "Without You", by Alexandra Burke from The Truth Is, 2018
- "Without You", by Cashmere Cat from Princess Catgirl, 2019
- "Without You", by Issues from Beautiful Oblivion, 2019
- "Without You", by Westlife from Spectrum, 2019

==== 2020s ====
- "Without You" (The Kid Laroi song), 2020
- "Without You" (Luke Combs song), 2020
- "Without You" by Moonlight Haze from Lunaris, 2020
- "Without You" by Whitechapel from Kin, 2021
- "Without You" by For the Fallen Dreams from For the Fallen Dreams, 2023
- "Without You" by Quavo, 2023
- "Without You" by Casey Lee Williams from the 2024 animated web series Sonic X Shadow Generations: Dark Beginnings
- "Without You" by Attack Attack! from Attack Attack! II, 2025
- "Without You" by Galneryus from A Cry from the Sky Above, 2026

== Other uses ==
- Without You (book), a 2006 memoir by Anthony Rapp
- Without You (film), a 1934 British comedy film
- Without You, a 2008 film by Tal Rosner
- Without You (TV series), a 2011 UK drama starring Anna Friel
- Without you (speech), a 2022 social media post by Ukrainian President Volodymyr Zelenskyy

== See also ==
- "Ohne dich" (German for "Without You"), a 2004 song by Rammstein
- "Wid Out Ya", a 2006 song by Blog 27
- "But Without You", a 2025 song by Janalynn Castelino
- Me Without You (disambiguation)
- With or Without You (disambiguation)
- With You (disambiguation)
- Without Me (disambiguation)
- Without U (disambiguation)
- Without You I'm Nothing (disambiguation)
- Without Your Love (disambiguation)
- Tere Bin (disambiguation) (lit. 'Without You')
- Tere Bina (disambiguation)
