= Mangaloreans =

Regions with significant populations
- Dakshina Kannada: 2,083,625 (2011)
- Udupi district: 1,177,908 (2011)
- Kassergode: 150 (2020)

Languages
- Tulu, Konkani, Kannada, Malayalam, Beary, Urdu

Religion
- Hinduism, Islam, Christianity, Jainism, Buddhism

Mangaloreans (Tulu: Kudladaklu; Kannada: Mangaloorinavaruu; Konkani: Kodialkar; Beary: Maikaltanga; Urdu: Kaudalvale) are a collection of diverse ethnic groups that hail from the historical locales of South Canara (Tulunaad) on the south western coast of Karnataka, India, particularly the residents native to Mangaluru (Mangalore).

== History ==
=== Classical history ===
According to the works of Sangam literature (300 BCE – 300 CE), Tulu Nadu was one of the 12 socio-geographical regions included in the ancient Tamilakam. Tulu Nadu must certainly at one time have formed part of ancient Kerala (Chera dynasty), where the western coastal dialect of Old Tamil was spoken. It must have separated from Tamilakam sometime between 300 CE and 500 CE, when the Kadambas invaded the northern portions of Chera kingdom. No definite historical record relating to Tulu Nadu, other than those were found from Sangam literature, have been found of earlier date than 8th or 9th century CE.

=== Emergence of Tulunaad as a distinct cultural entity ===
Historically, Tulunaad included the two separate lands of Haiva and Tuluva. The Ballal kings of Sullia had ruled this area around 1100 years back. The Tulu Brahmin migration to Tulunaad might have happened during the lifetime of the Kadamba king Mayuravarma at 345 AD. During the 13th century, the Hindu philosopher Madhvacharya built the Ashta Mathagalu (eight temple complexes) in the present-day Udipi district, that was partitioned from the older South Canara district, other parts being Mangalore district and Kassergode district.

During the rule of Vijayanagara, Tulu Nadu comprised two administrative subdivisions— Mangaluru and Barakuru along with others such as the Hosdurg fort in Kassergode. In Tulunaad lied the home turf of the Tuluva dynasty, the third to take charge of the Vijayanagara dynasty. Tulu Nadu was governed by feudatories of the Vijayanagara Empire until the 17th century. The longest reigning dynasty of Tulu Nadu were the Alupas, feudatories and nobility of the prominent dynasties of Carnatic region. The Kadamba dynasty of Banavasi was the earliest, under which the Alupas flourished. Later the Rashtrakutas of Manyakheta, Chalukyas of Badami, Chalukyas of Kalyani, Hoysalas of Durasamudra & Rayas (kings) of Vijayanagara were the overlords. The Alupas however, were feudatories, since they ruled as subordinates in the Vijaynagara dominion of Tulunaad from 14th century onwards. The area became prosperous during the Vijayanagara period, with Barcoor and Mangalore gaining importance. After the decline of the Vijayanagara Empire, much of Tulu Nadu came under the control of the Keladi Nayakas of Ikkeri.

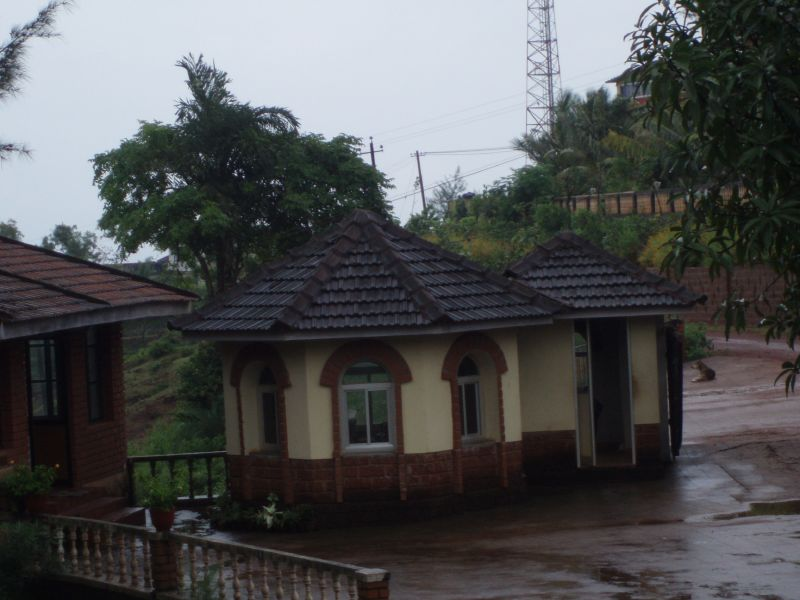
A typical red tile-roofed house in Tulu Nadu

Jain Bunts were already a prominent group and even today are uniquely preserved in Tulunaad. Though small in number, the Jains left behind indelible reminders of their past with a number Jain sites (bastis) in Moodabidri; and monoliths of Bahubali and the Gomateshwara in Karkala, Venoor& Dharmasthala. Over the centuries, more ethnic groups migrated to the area. Various Hindu Konkani people namely Gaud Saraswat Brahmins, Daivajnya Brahmins, Karhad Brahmins; also a few Chitpavans (Konkanastha Brahmins), Vaishya Vanis& Rajapur Saraswat Brahmins arrived by sea, during the period of religious oppression by the intolerant Portuguese colonial regime.

Abbakka Chowta killed General Jao Peixoto and Admiral Mascarenhas in battle at Ullal. Shivappa Nayaka defeated Portugal's armada in battle. In the 16th century, the area saw the first arrival of Konkani New Christians who were fleeing the Inquisition in Portuguese Goa and were given refuge by Vijayanagar, the influx of migrants resumed with the violent Mahratta Invasion of Goa and Bombay when they were again welcomed, particularly by Keladi Chennamma. The settlements of these New Christians in the area gave rise to their own unique hybrid culture, they developed into a localised community of Mangalorean Christians, who are distinct from Goan Christians and Bombay East Indian Christians. They built a number of prominent educational institutions and contributed to socio-economic progress in the area. The Muslims of Tulu Nadu are basically descended from Arabian traders who intermarried local women and settled there. Muslims in Mangaluru speak Beary language different from Hindi-Urdu. A few Konkani Muslims and Konkani Jains are also found near the border with Karwar district (North Canara).

== Demographics ==
Majority of Mangaloreans belong to the Tuluva ethnic group. The Tuluvas have historically been concentrated in the coastal areas. The major Tulu speaking castes are Shettigar, Mundalas, Mogeras, Okkaliga Gowda's, Bairas, Samagaras, Billavas,Kulala's, Sapaliga, Rajaka (Madival), Bunts, Mogaveeras, Devadiga's, Tulu Brahmins, Vishwakarmas& Nayak's. Mangalorean Protestants are mostly Tulu speakers. Beary speaking muslims are next largest community. Konkani people, in particular the Gaud Saraswat Brahmins, Daivadnya Brahmins, and the Mangalorean Catholics whose ancestors migrated here from the Konkan region, to escape the Portuguese Inquisition in Goa and Bombay-Bassein and the Mahratta Sackings of Goa and Bombay-Bassein. Other groups who historically settled in Tulu Nadu, include the Kundagannadans and Byaris and Dakhini Urdu Speaking Muslims.

== Culture ==
=== Cuisine ===
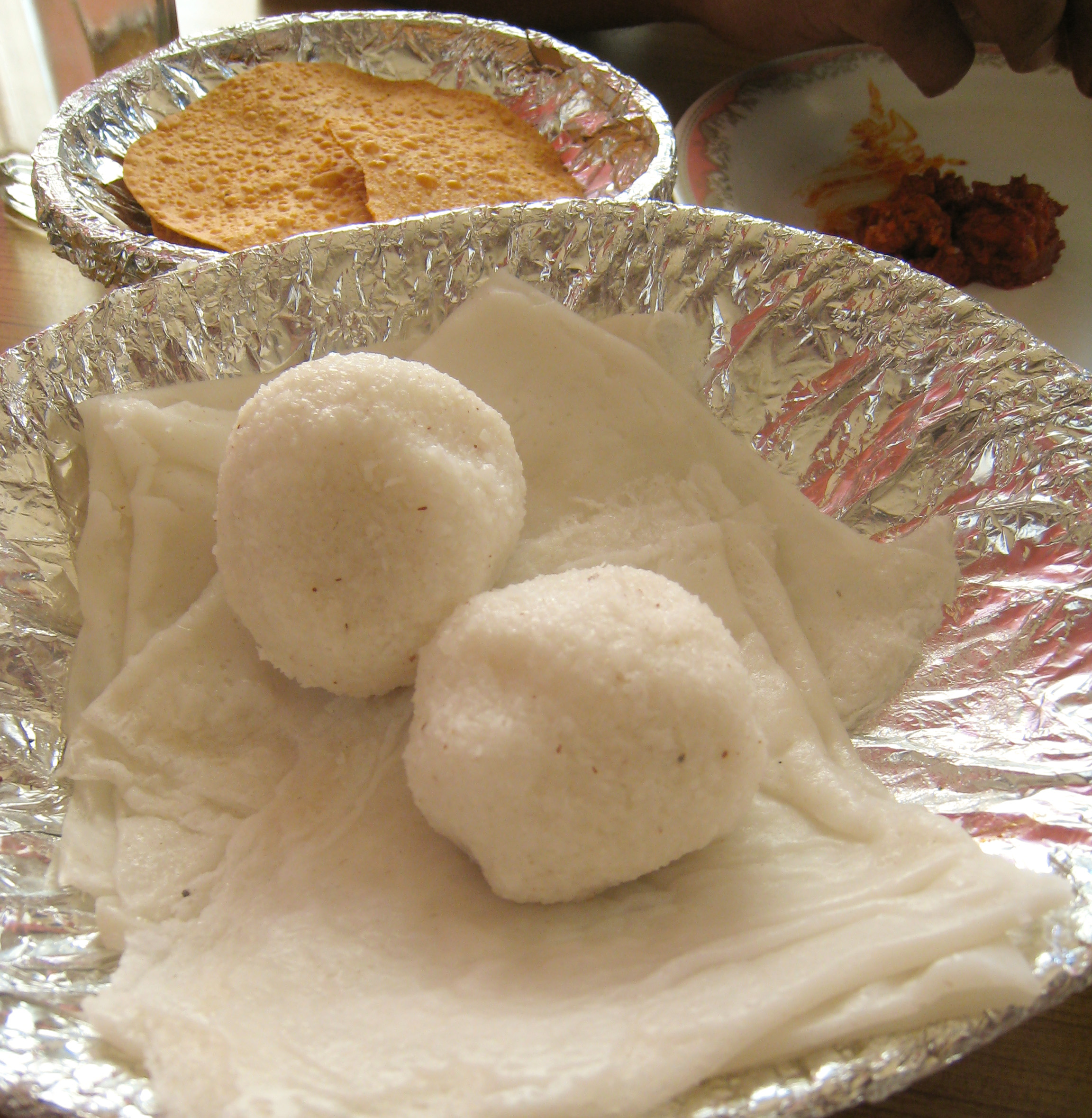
Neer dosa, a variant of dosa, is native to Mangalore.

Mangalorean cuisine is largely influenced by the South Indian cuisine, with several cuisines being unique to the diverse communities of the city. Coconut meat and curry leaves are common ingredients in Mangalorean curries, as are ginger, garlic& chilli. The Tulu community's well-known dishes include Kori Rotti (dry rice flakes dipped in gravy), Chicken Ghee Roast, Bangude Pulimunchi (silver-grey mackerels), Beeja-Manoli Upkari, Neer dosa (lacy rice-crêpes), Boothai Gasi, Kadabu, and Patrode. The Kube Sukkhe, a clam dish of Mangalorean Protestants is also very popular. The Konkani community's specialities include Daali thoy, beebe-upkari (cashew based), val val, avnas ambe sasam, Kadgi chakko, paagila podi, and chana gashi. Tuluva vegetarian cuisine in Mangalore, also known as Udupi cuisine is known for its signature dishes like the masala dosa. Udupi restaurants are found throughout south India, northwestern India& relished overseas by the Indian diaspora. Since Mangalore is a coastal town, fish dishes are the staple diet of most people. Mangalorean Catholic cuisine includes Sanna-Dukra Maas (Sanna –idli fluffed with toddy or yeast; Dukra Maas –Pork), Pork Bafat& Sorpotel; and the Mutton Biryani of the local Muslims are well-known delicacies. Pickles such as happala, sandige and puli munchi are unique to Mangalore. Sheindi (toddy), a country wine prepared by toddy tappers from coconut flowers or tree sap is local speciality.

=== Traditions ===
Many classical dance forms and folk art are practised among Mangaloreans. The Yakshagana, a night-long dance and drama performance, is held in Mangalore, while Hulivesha (literally, tiger dance), a folk dance unique to the city, is performed during Dasara and Krishna Janmashtami. Karadi Vesha (bear dance) is another well known dance performed during Dasara. Paddanas (Ballad-like epics passed on through generations by word of mouth) are sung by a community of impersonators in Tulu and are usually accompanied by the rhythmic drum beats. The Bearys' unique traditions are reflected in such folk songs as kolkai (sung during kolata, a valour folk-dance during which sticks used as props), unjal pat (traditional lullaby), moilanji pat, and oppune pat (sung at weddings). The Evkaristik Purshanv (Konkani: Eucharistic procession) is an annual Catholic religious procession led on the first Sunday of each New Year.

=== World record ===
On 26–27 January 2008, a Konkani cultural event, Konkani Nirantari, held in Mangaluru by a Mangalorean organization, Mandd Sobhann, entered the Guinness Book of World Records for non-stop singing of Konkani hymns. Mandd Sobhann members sang for 40 hours, surpassing the old record of 36 hours held by a Brazilian musical troupe.

== Notable Mangaloreans ==
- Abbakka Rani – Chowta queen of Tulu Nadu
- Ganesh Karnik – former member of Karnataka Legislative Council
- John Richard Lobo – former member of Karnataka Legislative Assembly
- Aarti Sequeira – Indian American cook and television personality
- Aastha Shetty - Canadian news reporter
- Abdussalam Puthige – managing director and editor-in-chief of Varthabharathi newspaper
- Adline Castelino – winner of Miss Diva Universe 2020
- Aishwarya Rai – Bollywood actress and former Miss World
- Anup Bhandari – Sandalwood director
- Ashrita Shetty – model and Kollywood actress, former wife of Indian cricketer Manish Pandey
- Nirup Bhandari – Sandalwood actor
- Anant Pai – educationist and creator of Indian comics
- Anushka Shetty – Kollywood and Tollywood actress
- Aravind Adiga – writer and journalist
- Ashish Kumar Ballal – captain of the Indian National Hockey team
- Ashwini Akkunji – sprint athlete, Asian Games and Commonwealth Games gold medalist
- B. M. Idinabba – Kannada writer, poet, social activist, MLA, and freedom fighter
- B. R. Shetty – entrepreneur
- B. V. Karanth – playwright and director
- Bannanje Govindacharya – Madhava scholar
- Betty Naz, Indian former actress and singer
- Bolwar Mahammad Kunhi – Kannada writer
- Brian J. G. Pereira – veteran biopharmaceutical and healthcare leader
- Budhi Kunderan – cricketer
- Daya Nayak – sub-inspector in the Mumbai Police
- Dayanand Shetty – Indian film actor and model
- Devi Prasad Shetty – cardiac surgeon and philanthropist
- Egan Steven Dantis – Spanish Indian cricketer
- Erica Fernandes – television actress
- Ester Noronha – Indian actress and singer
- Faye D'Souza – Indian journalist and television news anchor
- Freida Pinto – Indian actress and model
- Ganesh Hegde – singer, performer, video director, and Bollywood choreographer
- George Fernandes – Railway and Defence Minister
- Gopalakrishna Adiga – Kannada poet
- Gurukiran – singer and music director in the Kannada film industry
- Janalynn Castelino – Indian-Italian pop singer, songwriter and doctor
- Janardhana Poojary – former Union Minister of State for Finance
- Jemimah Rodrigues – All formats active India woman cricketer
- K. S. Hegde – former speaker of Lok Sabha and Supreme Court judge
- K. Shivaram Karanth – Kannada writer, social activist, environmentalist, Yakshagana artist, film maker, and thinker
- K. V. Kamath – chairman of Infosys Limited
- Kadri Gopalnath – Carnatic musician, saxophone
- Kalpana – Indian Kannada film actress
- Krithi Shetty – Indian actress
- M. Govinda Pai – Kannada poet
- M. V. Kamath – journalist and former chairman of Prasar Bharthi
- Madhwacharya – Hindu saint and philosopher
- M. K. Seetharam Kulal – Tulu-Kannada dramatist, poet, Karnataka State Tulu Sahitya Academy Award, Mangalorean Star
- Malishka Mendonsa – Indian radio personality and actress
- Mamatha Maben – former captain of India women's national cricket team
- Mamatha Poojary – former captain of India women's national kabaddi team
- Manvitha Harish – Sandalwood actress
- Margaret Alva – former Union Minister and parliamentarian
- Michael Lobo – Indian writer, scientist and genealogist
- Nikhil Poojari – Indian professional football player (forward), plays for Hyderabad FC
- Nitte Santosh Hegde – justice of the Supreme Court Of India, former Solicitor General of India, and Lokayukta (ombudsman) for Karnataka State of India from 2006–2011 and activist
- Oscar Fernandes – Congress Chief Secretary and Parliamentarian
- Pooja Hegde – Miss Universe India 2010 second runner up and Kollywood actress
- Prakash Raj – actor, director, and producer who won the National Award winner in 2008
- Rakshith Shetty – Kannada film director and actor
- Ratnakaravarni – Kannada poet and writer
- Ravi Shastri – former captain of the India national cricket team
- Rishab Shetty – Sandalwood director
- Rita Lobo – Indian former actress and singer
- Rohit Shetty – Bollywood director
- Rommel Rodrigues – journalist, author, film director, screenwriter, and producer
- Sanjay Manjrekar – former Indian cricketer and commentator
- Sandeep Chowta – Bollywood and Tollywood music director, head of Columbia Records in India
- Sheetal Mallar – model
- Shamita Shetty – Bollywood actress
- Shilpa Shetty – Bollywood actress
- Shirish Kunder – Bollywood director
- Shweta Shetty – Indian pop singer
- Siddhanth Thingalaya – track and field athlete
- Sneha Ullal – Bollywood actress
- Sonal Monteiro – Sandalwood actress
- Sudarshan Shetty - contemporary Indian artist
- Sunil Shetty – Bollywood actor, producer, and entrepreneur
- Suman Talwar – film actor
- T. M. A. Pai – doctor, educationist, banker and philanthropist, founder of the university town of Manipal in Udupi
- Tanush Kotian – Indian cricketer
- Terence Lewis (choreographer) – Indian dancer, singer and choreographer
- Thumbay Moideen – entrepreneur and founder of Thumbay Group, UAE
- U. R. Rao – space scientist and former chairman of the Indian Space Research Organisation
- Upendra – Kannada film actor, director, screen writer, lyricist and singer
- V. J. P. Saldanha – Konkani littérateur, dramatist, novelist, short-story writer and poet
- V. Manohar – music director, lyricist, film director and actor in Kannada Cinema
- V. S. Acharya – higher education minister in the Karnataka state government
- V. T. Rajshekar – journalist, founder and editor of the Dalit Voice
- Veerappa Moily – Minister of Corporate Affairs and former chief minister of Karnataka
- Veerendra Heggade – philanthropist and the Dharmadhikari (hereditary administrator) of the Dharmasthala Temple
- Victor Rodrigues – Konkani novelist and short story writer
- Viren Rasquinha – captain of India's national field hockey team
- Vishal Kotian – Indian film and television actor
- Vittal Mallya – entrepreneur
- Vijay Mallya – liquor and airline baron

== See also ==
- Byaris
- Chickmangaloreans
- Konkani Brahmins
- Mangalorean Christians
- Tuluvers
