= Culture of Mangaluru =

Overview of the culture of Mangalore (India)

Dakshina Kannada that was partitioned from the erstwhile South Canara, has been multicultural and is a little different from the prevalent culture of the Carnataca state of India. A native of Mangaluru is known as a Mangalurean in English, Kudladakulu in Tulu, Kodyaalkar in Konkani, Manglurnavaru in Kannada and Maikaaltanga in Byari.

== Tulu and Tulunaad's Culture ==
According to Keralolpathi, the name Tuluva for Tuluvers comes from the Cheraman Perumal kings of Malabar region, who fixed his residence in the northern portion of his dominions just before its separation from present-day Kerala, and who was called Tulubhan Perumal.

Yakshagana is a night-long dance and drama performance practised by Tuluvas with great fanfare. Piliyesa is a unique form of folk dance in the region fascinating the young and the old alike, which is performed during Marnemi (as Dussara is called in Tulu) and Krishna Janmashtami. Karadi Vesha (Bear Dance) is one more popular dance performed during Dasara in Mangaluru. Bhuta Kola a kind of spirit worship is usually done at night is practised by Tuluvers. Bhuta Kola is similar to Theyyam in Kerala. Kambala or buffalo race is conducted in water filled paddy fields. Korikatta (Cockfight) is another favourite sport for the people. An ancient ritual associated with the ‘daivasthanams’ (temples) in rural areas, Hindu kozhi kettu, a religious and spiritual cockfight, is held at the temples and also allowed if organised as part of religious or cultural events. Nagaradhane or Snake worship is practised according to the popular belief of the Snake god, who goes underground and guard the Naga species on the top.

== Konkani Culture ==
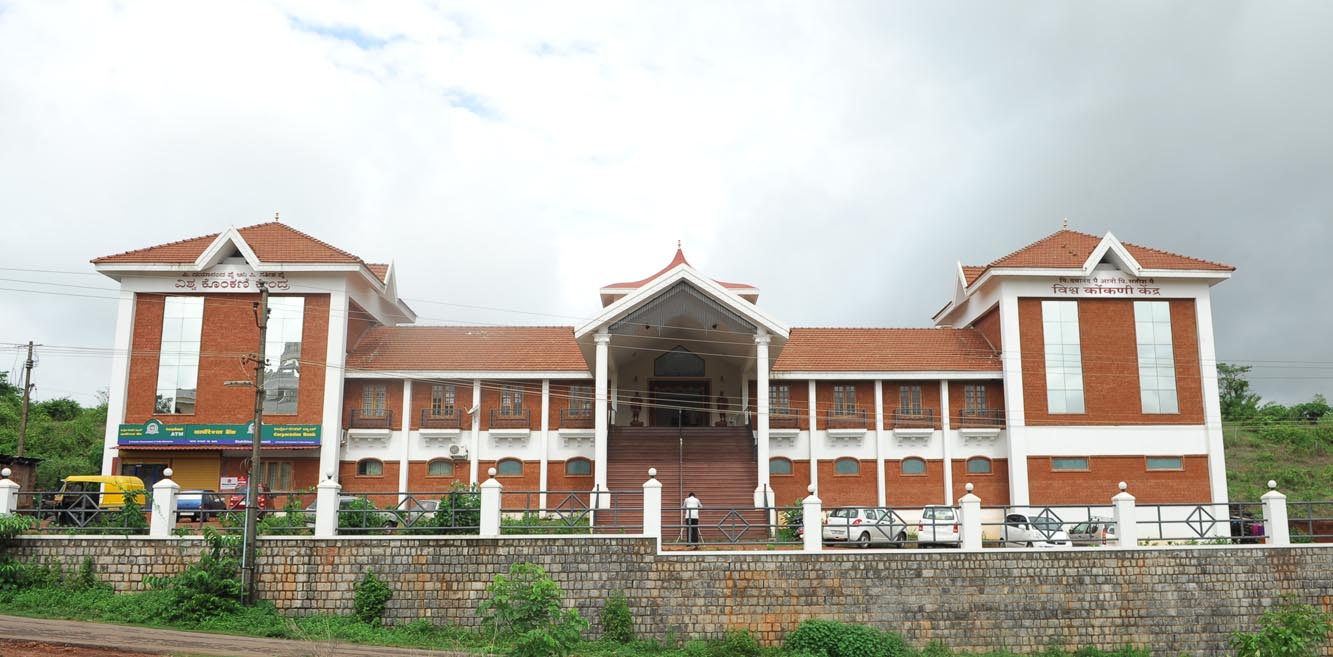
World Konkani Centre, Mangaluru

There are about 22 ethnic Konkani communities live in Mangaluru, including Gaud Saraswat Brahmins, Mangalorean Catholics, Daivadnyas, Kudumbi, Kharvi, Gudigar, Navayats etc. These communities speak dialects of Konknni. Religious festivals like car festivals of various Konkani Temples, Shigmo of Kudmi Community, Saanth Maarie of Christians keep alive the Konkani cultural ethos.

The World Konkani Centre designed by architect Dinesh K Shet, was built on a 3 acre plot called Konkani Gaon (Konkani village) at Shakti Nagar, Mangaluru, it was inaugurated on 17 January 2009, "to serve as a nodal agency for the preservation and overall development of Konkani language, art and culture involving all the Konkani people the world over."

== Infrastructure ==
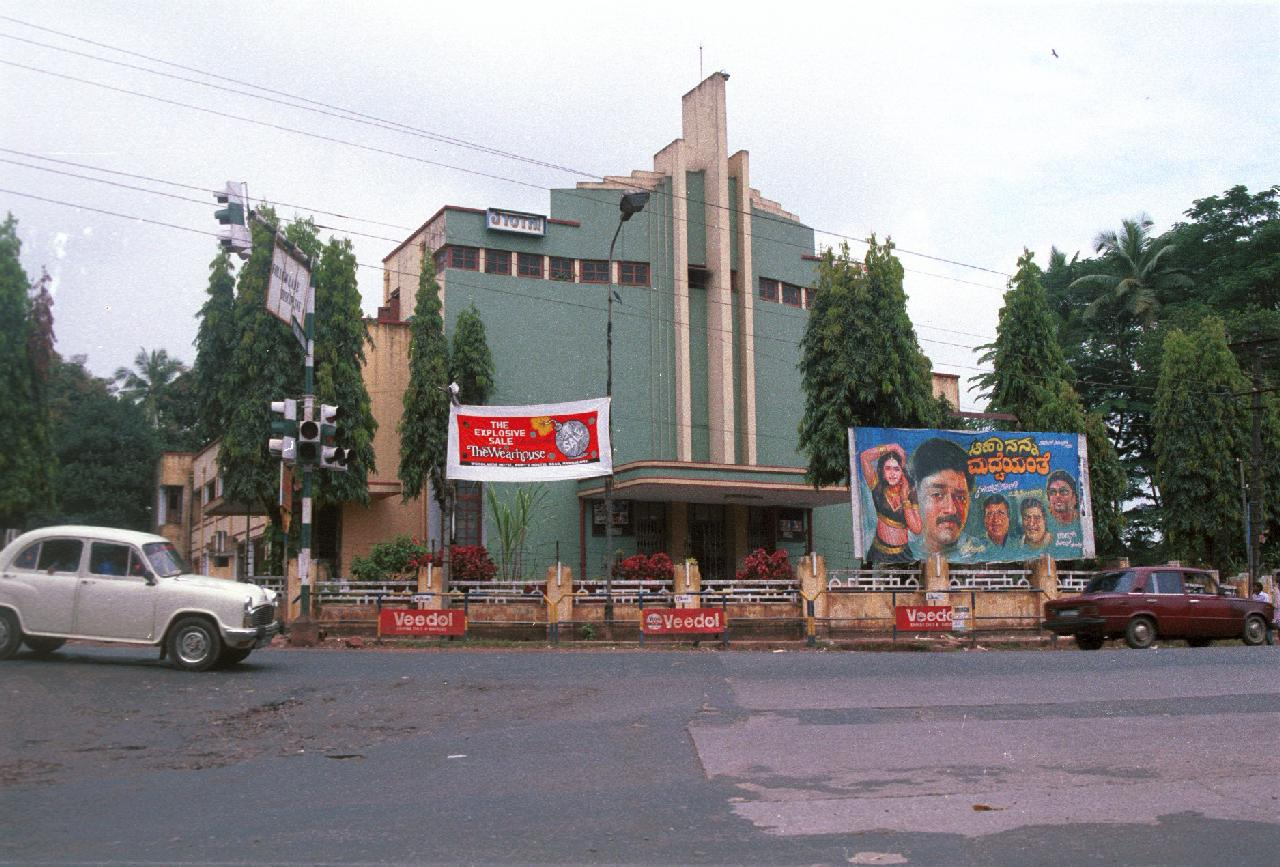
The Jyothi Talkies was a popular cinema theatre in Mangaluru

The Bibliophile's Paradise, a hi-tech public library run by the Corporation Bank, is located at Mannagudda. The Mangala Stadium, which is the only full-fledged stadium in Dakshina Kannada, is located in Mangalore.

== Practices ==
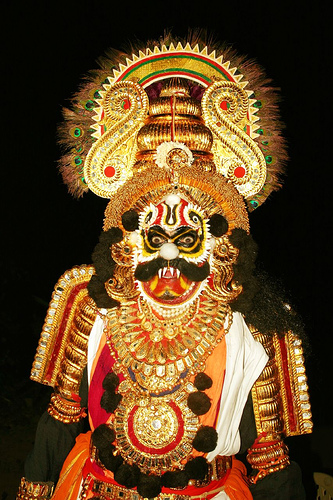
A typical Yakshagana artist

The Yakshagana is a night-long dance and drama performance practiced in Mangaluru. The Pilivesha (Tiger dance) is a folk dance unique to this area, which is performed during Dasara and Krishna Janmashtami. Karadi Vesha (Bear Dance) is performed during Dasara in Mangalore. Bhuta Kola or spirit worship, is practised here. Kambala or buffalo race is conducted in water filled paddy fields. Kolikatte (Cockfight) is another favourite sport for the people. To its supporters, cockfight, an ancient sport involving a fight between specially reared fowls held at the temples precincts in northern parts of Kasaragod, is not a blood sport but a feature of the rich cultural heritage of Tulunadu and an ancient ritual associated with the ‘daivasthanams’ (temples) here. Nagaradhane or Snake worship is practised in the city according to the popular belief of the Naga Devatha to go underground and guard the species on the top mangalore is known for Naga s during Punchami, the milk and Bonda (tender coconut) will be worshippped for god Naga in Naga bana(ant hill) and temples.

Pad'danas (Oral Epics) which are ballad-like folk epics narrated in Tulu are sung by the community of impersonators together with the rhythmic beats. Some of the popular Beary songs are kolkai (sung during the play of kolata), unjal pat (sung while putting a child to cradle), moilanji pat and oppune pat (sung at weddings). The Eucharistic Procession is an annual Catholic religious procession led on the first Sunday of the New Year of the Gregorian calendar.

== Festivals ==
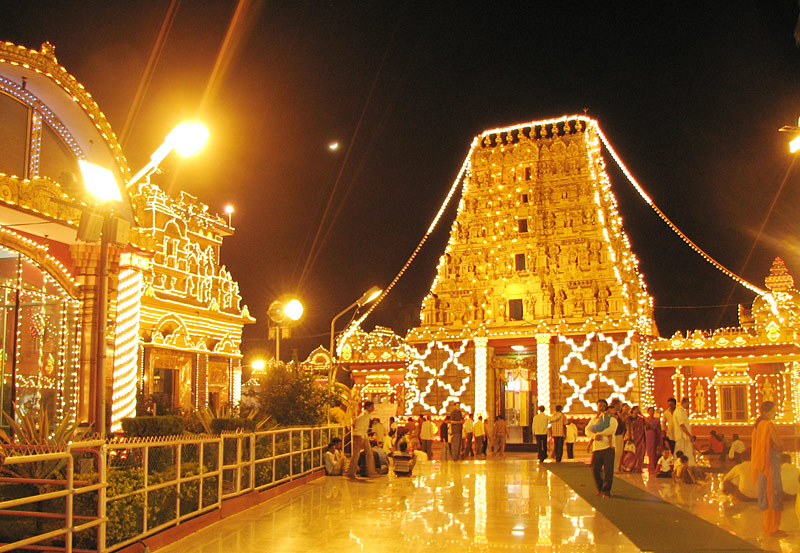
Gokarnanatheshwara Temple during Navaratri

Mangaluru Dasara is considered as one of the biggest festivals in Mangaluru and stands second place after Mysuru Dasara in state of Karnataka. The Ganesh Chaturthi festival is celebrated every year by erecting statues, worshipping them and immersing them in water bodies. Kodial Theru or Mangaluru Rathotsava (Mangaluru Car Festival) is one of the major festivals of the GSB community, which celebrates the car festival of the Sri Venkatramana Temple. Monti Fest is one of the major festivals of the Mangalorean Catholic community, celebrating the Nativity feast and the blessing of new crops. The Jain Milan, a committee of the Jain families of Mangaluru, organise the Jain Food Festival annually with a view to bring together all the members of the Jain community. People of all faiths participate in the Mosaru Kudike, which is a part of the celebrations to mark the Krishna Janmashtami festival. Annual festivals are promoted during summer each year, to promote Karavali Utsav and Kudlostava which encourages the local cultural events. In 2006, the Tulu film festival was organized in Mangaluru. Mangaluru's Festivals are incomplete without Hulivesha /Pilivesha (Tiger dance) it brings attraction towards Mangaluru city .

== Cuisine ==
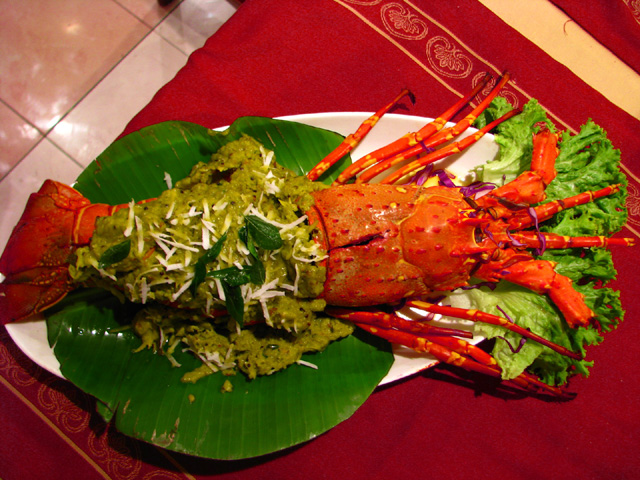
Lobster neeruli, a local delicacy from the coastal city of Mangaluru, where seafood is popular.

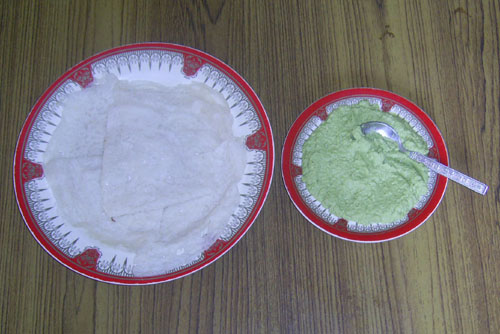
Neer dosa, a variant of dosa is native to Mangaluru

Mangalorean cuisine is largely influenced by South Indian cuisine. Mangalurean curry uses a lot of coconut and curry leaves. Ginger, garlic and chili is also used in curry. Mangalurean fish curry is known for its taste in the whole of Canara. Dishes of the Tulu community include Kori Rotti, Kori Gassi, Bangude Pulimunchi, Beeja-Manoli Upkari, Neer dosa, Chicken Ghee Roast, Chicken Sukka, Channya Gasi , Boothai Gasi, Kadabu, Masala Dosa and Patrode. The Konkani community has its specialities that include Daali thoy, beebe-upkari (cashew based), val val, avnas ambe sasam, Kadgi chakko , molay randhoy . The Sanna-Dukra Maas (Sanna – idli fluffed with toddy or yeast; Dukra Maas – Pork) of the Mangalorean Catholics and the Mutton Biryani of the Mangalorean Muslims are well-known dishes. An assortment of pickles like happala, sandige and puli munchi are unique to Mangaluru. Khali (toddy), a country liquor prepared from the coconut flower's sap is a well-known liquor of Mangalore. The vegetarian cuisine is same as Udupi cuisine. Since Mangaluru is a coastal town, Fish forms the staple diet of most people. Mangaluru is known for sea food since its in costal region.The sea food available in Mangaluru is mainly attracted by other people over India. The authentic spice used in Kudla is all home made spices which brings taste to food prepared by all Mangalurean 's houses different from other places.

== Museums ==
Mangaluru is the site of the Aloyseum and Srimanthi Bhai Memorial Government Museum. Aloyseum houses various souvenirs such as pieces of the Berlin Wall, Mangaluru's first car, whale skeleton, coins and medals of ancient kingdoms, etc. Srimanthi Bhai Memorial Government Museum at Bejai contains coins of ancient dynasties namely the Hoysala, Vijayanagara, Chola, Adilshashis, Rome, Kadambas, Mughals, Shatavahanas, Guptas, Delhi Sultanate, British Raj, princely states of Travancore, Mysore, Baroda, etc.
