= Me Without You =

Me Without You may refer to:

== Songs ==
- "Me Without You" (Loick Essien song), 2011
- "Me Without You" (TobyMac song), 2012
- "Me Without You", by All Time Low from Don't Panic
- "Me Without You", by Ashley Tisdale from Guilty Pleasure
- "Me Without You", by Gwen Stefani from This Is What the Truth Feels Like
- "Me Without You", by the Monkees from Instant Replay
- "Me Without You", by Jennifer Nettles from That Girl
- "Me Without You", by Rebecca St. James from God
- "Me Without You", by Tim and the Glory Boys, 2021
- "Me (Without You)", by Andy Gibb from Andy Gibb's Greatest Hits

== Other uses ==
- Me Without You (book), a 2011 book by Lisa Swerling and Ralph Lazar
- Me Without You (film), a 2001 British film directed by Sandra Goldbacher
- "Me Without You" (Medium), a television episode
- MewithoutYou, an American rock band

== See also ==
- Without You (disambiguation)
- With or Without You (disambiguation)
- Without Me (disambiguation)
- "But Without You", a 2025 song by Janalynn Castelino
- "Wid Out Ya", a 2006 song by Blog 27
