= Without U (disambiguation) =

"Without U" is a song by 2PM.

Without U may also refer to:

- "Without U", song by Thelma Aoyama
- "Without U", song by Jesse McCartney from his 2004 album Beautiful Soul

== See also ==
- Without You (disambiguation)
- With You (disambiguation)
- "But Without You", a 2025 song by Janalynn Castelino
- "Wid Out Ya", a 2006 song by Blog 27
