= With or Without You (disambiguation) =

"With or Without You" is a 1987 song by U2 from The Joshua Tree.

With or Without You may also refer to:

== Film ==
- With or Without You (1992 film), a Hong Kong action film by Taylor Wong
- With or Without You (1999 film), a British romance-drama film by Michael Winterbottom
- With or Without You (2003 film), an American comedy-drama film by G. Stubbs
- With or Without You (2021 film), an Italian romance-drama film by Stefano Sardo
- With or Without You (2024 film), an Australian family drama starring Marta Dusseldorp

== Television ==
- With or Without You (TV series), a 2015 Hong Kong drama series
- "With or Without You" (Grey's Anatomy), a 2015 television episode
- "With or Without You" (Missing You), a 2025 television episode

== Music ==
- With or Without You, a 2000 U2 tribute album by Kane
- "With or Without You", a 2010 song by Kirsten Price, from Brixton to Brooklyn
- "With or Without You", a 2000 song by Cher, from not.com.mercial

== Literature ==
- "With or Without You", a 1999 Marvel Comics issue following X-Men: Gambit

== See also ==
- Without You (disambiguation)
- Me Without You (disambiguation)
- "But Without You", a 2025 song by Janalynn Castelino
- "Wid Out Ya", a 2006 song by Blog 27
