= Betty Naz =

Indian actress and singer (born 1945)

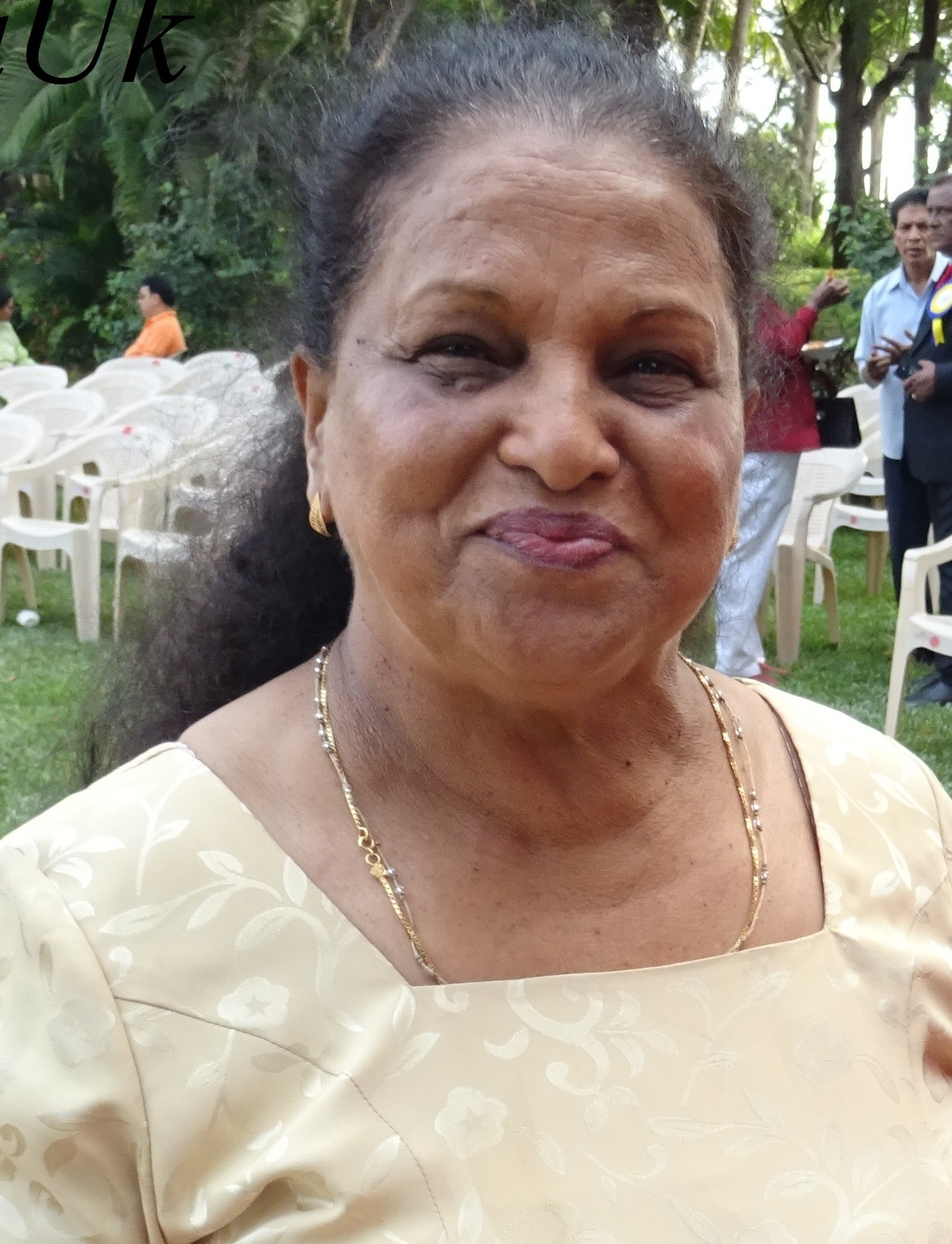
- Nazareth at the Kala Academy, 2017
- Born: Beatrice Jospehine Nazareth; 18 April 1945 (age 80); Bombay, Bombay Presidency, British India (now Mumbai, Maharashtra, India)
- Other names: Betty Naaz
- Occupations: Actress; singer
- Years active: 1958–2016
- Organisation: Maharashtra Konkani Kala Saunstha
- Spouse: Abdon Fernandes (m. 1977; died 2004)
- Children: 2
- Website: facebook.com/beatrice.fernandes.7399

Beatrice Jospehine Nazareth e Fernandes (née Nazareth; born 18 April 1945), known professionally as Betty Naz, is an Indian former actress and singer known for her work in Konkani films and tiatr productions.

Nazareth is a known figure in the realm of Konkani music and drama, known for her contributions and popularity among enthusiasts. With a career that commenced at the young age of 10, Nazareth has amassed a repertoire of stage performances spanning nearly six decades in Mangalorean and Goan Konkani theatre. By 2013, her vocal talents had graced over 250 Konkani audio albums, while her stage presence had been witnessed in nearly 3000 shows. Known for her versatility as both an actor and singer, Nazareth has established herself as an entertainer. Her acting skills have been praised for both her stage performances in tiatr productions and her appearances in movies, leading to various awards and recognition. Nazareth is known for her contributions to Muthukrishna Das's Konkani films, such as Jivit Amchem Oxem (1972) and Boglantt (1975). Her voice, especially in the singing of cantos in tiatr performances, remains memorable and influential.

== Early life ==
Beatrice Jospehine Nazareth was born on 28 April 1945 in the island of Mazgaon, Bombay (now Mumbai), which was part of the Bombay Presidency during the colonial era. Her family originally hailed from Mangalore. Her father, Aloysius Luis Nazareth, worked as a mechanic but was also involved in the local theatre scene as a performer. Her mother hails from the village of Bolkunje in Mangalore, while her father originally resided in the area of Bejai and later relocated to the town panchayat of Belthangady. Seeking improved opportunities, her parents migrated to Bombay. Nazareth was the third of seven children born to Aloysius and his wife, Elizabeth. From a young age, Nazareth was exposed to Konkani performance traditions through her father's work. Aloysius was a singer and composer who participated in Mangalorean theatrical productions. He even integrated the young Nazareth into one of his plays when she was an infant. Nazareth continued this family tradition of stage performance, taking part in school theatrical productions as she grew up. This background in the Konkani arts laid the foundation for Nazareth' later career.

Nazareth's early career in the performing arts can be traced back to her childhood experiences in the theater scene of Mazgaon, (now a neighborhood in Mumbai, India). When Nazareth was young, her father was cast in a play directed by AT Lobo, who recognized Nazareth's potential and gave her a role as a child performer. Mazgaon had a Konkani theater culture, with local Goan resident Rodrigues regularly staging short dramatic works in the regional language of Konkani. Given the large Catholic population in Nazareth's building, these community-based productions provided her with frequent opportunities to take the stage. Rodrigues eventually incorporated Nazareth into his own tiatr (Konkani theatrical production). Nazareth's involvement in Mazgaon's theater scene also led her to connect with a nearby Mangalorean theater association that featured Goan artists such as Succorine, Rico Rod, Titta Pretto, and Antonette Mendes.

Participating in this broader network of Konkani and Mangalorean performers allowed Nazareth to gain experience and recognition early in her career. The annual feast of Saint Anne on 26 July was a particularly important event for the Mazgaon theater community, with several plays and skits staged to commemorate the occasion. Nazareth's involvement in these productions helped her hone her craft and standing within the local performing arts scene. Through her father's initial theatrical role, the mentorship of Lobo, and her immersion in Mazgaon's Konkani and Mangalorean theater cultures, Nazareth was able to establish the foundations of her performing career from a young age, setting the stage for her later career.

== Career ==
Nazareth embarked on her theatrical journey during her childhood, immersing herself in the world of amateur theater at the age of 10. Her talents were immediately recognized during her debut performance, which took place at St. Anne's Church in Mazagaon, where she participated in the parish feast shows. It was this early display of skill that caught the attention of Maurice Cabral, a figure in the theater scene from Mangalore. In 1958, at the age of 13, Nazareth received a significant professional opportunity when Cabral offered her a leading role in his play Deswat. Eager to embrace the chance to showcase her abilities, she embraced the role, marking her arrival on the Konkani stage. Her performance in this tiatr left an impression on the directors of that era. Continuing her collaboration with Cabral, Nazareth went on to work on various plays, including productions such as Bhorvoso, Vaddol, Aneeth, and Kangan. Her acting prowess in plays such as Vhoni ani Dher, Tujem Durigmojea Bhatant, and Mojo Put Padri received acclaim and admiration from the public. These successful performances not only solidified her position in Konkani theater but also attracted attention from other directors, including AT Lobo, Suny D'Souza, Lawry Andrade, Cha-Fra, Francis Fernandes Cascia, and AC Misquith. As a result, Nazareth quickly ascended to the pinnacle of popularity among Konkani theater enthusiasts. Nazareth managed to captivate audiences through her singing and acting abilities, despite lacking any formal training in these disciplines. Her father, who had previously worked with directors like AT Lobo, himself had a background in stage acting, contributing to Nazareth' artistic upbringing. While other members of her family possessed artistic talents, they did not pursue them as professional careers to the same extent as Nazareth.

Nazareth, driven by her passion for acting, pursued employment to secure her livelihood. She embarked on a nine-year tenure with the Bombay-based Philips company, until circumstances compelled her to relinquish her position when the company relocated to Poona. Concurrently engaged in acting ventures across Mumbai, Mangalore, and Goa, Nazareth showcased her vocal prowess in over 250 audio albums. Collaborating with figures such as M. Boyer's Golden Goa album, Rosary Fernandes, Romeo Mendes, Prince Jacob, Chris-Meena, Lawrence Saldhana, Connie M, Julie Rod, and Kenny, Nazareth established herself as a versatile singer. While initially balancing both acting and singing, Nazareth received counsel from Mangalorean directors, who advised her to prioritize acting due to the inherent difficulties of maintaining proficiency in both disciplines. Nevertheless, in Goa, Nazareth once again found herself in an environment that embraced her multifaceted talents, as the local stage demanded performers to excel in both singing and acting. She further contributed her vocal artistry to musical events organized by figures such as Victor Concesso, Kenny, Tony Martin, and others. She has also showcased her vocal talents alongside a Hindi orchestra in the city of Mumbai. Embracing membership in the Goan association, Nazareth reaped significant benefits by immersing herself in the realm of Goan professional theatre.

Throughout her career, Nazareth remained actively engaged in professional shows within the theater scene of Goa. As a consequence, she made the difficult decision to bid farewell to her stage career in Mangalore, opting instead to concentrate on the artistic Goan stage. This allowed her to secure significant roles and collaborate with some of the popular Konkani directors of the time, including C. Alvares, Prem Kumar, M. Boyer, Joe Rose, Rosary Ferns, Tony Martin, Cristina Vaz, Peter Fernandes, and Mike Mehta, among others. Nazareth achieved acclaim in Goa through her performances in several influential plays, such as Laz Naslolo Konn, Khoto Poiso, Vaante, Donn Kalzan, and Sezarachi Combi. Her talent also extended to the realm of film, as she had the opportunity to act in two Konkani feature films, namely Boglantt and Jivith Amchem Oxem, both directed by Bangalore-based director Muthukrishna Das. In the Konkani movie Boglantt, director Prem Kumar, recognizing her acting skills, honored Nazareth with the title "Meena Kumari of Konkani Theatre". Beyond her stage and film endeavors, Nazareth further showcased her versatility by appearing in a number of Konkani video films. Her talent and popularity transcended regional boundaries, leading her and the Goan team to embark on international tours, captivating audiences in destinations such as Dubai, Muscat, Kuwait, Bahrain, Doha, London, Israel, and Canada. Their performances included the Konkani drama Fulan ani Kantte, a production reminiscent of a non-stop opera.

In India, Nazareth has undertaken extensive tours across cities such as Pune, Karwar, Ahmedabad, Delhi, and Kolkata, where she has demonstrated her artistic talents through live performances. While actively engaged in the Goan entertainment industry, Nazareth has continued her affiliation with Mangalore. In 2008, she made a significant contribution to the Konkani Niranthari program organized by Mandd Sobhann, which subsequently set a Guinness World Record. In addition to her career, she has displayed her acting talent in eight plays written by Francis Fernandes Cascia, most known in the successful production Mataro Chorbela. This play has received widespread acclaim internationally, with over 60 performances staged worldwide. As of 2013, furthermore, Nazareth portrayed a prominent role in a new drama penned by Francis Fernandes. A testament to her talent, Nazareth has continued to assume leading roles in theatrical productions even after surpassing the age of 40, although she now adeptly embodies characters such as mothers, sisters, or sisters-in-law, aligning with the conventional trajectory for actresses of her age. It is worth noting that actresses over 40 are seldom presented with opportunities to portray heroines, making Nazareth fortunate to secure some of the most coveted roles even in the later stages of her career. Throughout her artistic journey, Nazareth has popularized a diverse repertoire of songs, including "Galfak Vetam," "Nach Goynkara" from Ivor D Cunha's musical show, as well as captivating melodies featured in her debut cassette tape, such as "Bebdo Gabru, "Poppat Bai," and "Mammicho ugdas," among others.

During the production of a Konkani film, Rico Rod received a visit from Muthukrishna Das, who traveled from Bangalore to seek his assistance. Das articulated his aspiration to produce a cinematic work in Konkani and sought Rico's expertise in the casting procedures. Leveraging his connection with writer-director Maurice Cabral, Rico approached Cabral to help in the selection of actors. Cabral, together with Rico, introduced Nazareth to Das, leading to her selection as the lead actress in Das's debut Konkani film, Jivit Amchem Oxem. Nazareth shared the screen with actors such as Dr. Ramani, Cecilia Machado, and South Indian actors, including Pandari Bai. Following that, Nazareth was featured in another Konkani film by Das, titled Boglantt, playing the character of a mother to actor Prem Kumar. Alongside her involvement in Das's films, Nazareth concurrently participated in Rico Rod's tiatr production titled Unni Ani Der However, due to a request from director C. Alvares, Francis Fernandes Cassia kindly released Nazareth from her commitment to a Mangalorean drama, which was in the midst of rehearsals. This was to accommodate Nazareth's participation in Alvares's ladies show called Khoincho Sakrament. Through her collaboration with Rico Rod and C. Alvares, Nazareth made her debut on the Goan tiatr stage. Subsequently, she delivered several acclaimed performances, showcasing her talents in both singing and acting, while working with popular directors such as M. Boyer, Prem Kumar, and Remmie Colaço. Additionally, Nazareth made appearances in the khell tiatrs directed by Rosario Rodrigues.

Nazareth also emerged as a popular figure in the realm of khell tiatrs, a traditional form of Goan theatrical entertainment. She gained recognition by participating in various tiatrs directed by individuals such as Menino de Bandar, Roseferns, and A. M. Pacheco. Her most recent recorded public appearance occurred in a theatrical production overseen by Pacheco in the 2015–16 season. In 1989, Nazareth ventured into production, overseeing the creation of an audio cassette entitled Devachem Besanv. The recording showcased the talents of her spouse, Abdon, and their young son, Aaron, who was just four years old during the recording. The musical accompaniment for the cassette was crafted by Nazareth' husband and Annibal Crasto. Throughout her involvement in tiatrs, Nazareth garnered acclaim for her contributions to the Mangalorean stage. Directors often composed special cantos exclusively tailored to her vocal abilities, indicating the high value placed on her singing prowess. When reflecting on her most memorable performance amidst the several tiatrs she has acted in, Nazareth highlights the Mangalorean tiatr Kankon (Bangle), which was written and directed by Maurice Cabral. This particular production explored the theme of extramarital affairs, in which Nazareth portrayed a modest wife. However, a highlight of her role was a captivating dance performance, wherein her character was observed by her on-screen husband through a transparent glass partition. Nazareth' body of work encompasses various tiatrs, including performances in productions like M. Boyer's Ekuch Rosto, Renmie Colaço's Atancho Temp, and C. Alvares' Konnem Lailo Uzo, (where she portrayed a character struggling with drug addiction), Prem Kumar's Jawan, Menino de Bandar's Soglleank Gorjechem (depicting a tale of fortune reversal), and Rosario Rodrigues's theatrical works such as Fulam ani Kolle and Uzvadd Pallovlo.

Since its establishment in 1995, Nazareth has served as the treasurer of the Maharashtra Konkani Kala Saunstha, an organization dedicated to promoting Konkani arts and culture. In addition to her acting work, Nazareth is acclaimed for her skills as a kantar singer. She has contributed her vocal talents to several commercial music productions, lending her voice to recordings by various producers. Nazareth has appeared in theatrical productions directed by several popular Konkani dramatists, including C. Alvares, M. Boyer, Jacinto Vaz, Remmie Colaço, Robin Vaz, Alfred Rose, Rico Rod, Chris Perry, Titta Pretto, Prem Kumar, Mike Mehta, Rosario Rodrigues, Roseferns, Menino De Bandar, Chris Meena, and Samuel Carvalho. Her filmography also includes roles in Konkani music videos, such as Dison Kuddo, Aikon Bhero, Atancheo Sunno, and Bombay to Goa. According to writer Wilson Mazarello, "Nazareth is recognized as a versatile and accomplished actress, capable of delivering performances across a wide range of characters." During the 1990s, she was particularly acclaimed for her portrayals of maternal roles, and is considered one of the most sought-after actresses for such parts. Nazareth has frequently collaborated with other Konkani singers, participating in duets, trios, and quartet performances. She has also produced her own audio recordings and is regarded for her vocal work on various audio cassette projects. In addition to her work in India, Nazareth has undertaken extensive tours abroad as a tiatrist, or Konkani theater artist.

== Personal life ==
In 1977, Nazareth entered into matrimony with Abdon R. Fernandes, a Goan musician widely known as Abbey from Saligão. Abbey had established himself as a film musician, collaborating with Hindi music artists such as Kalyanji-Anandji, Babla & Kanchan, and contributing to the musical performances of Goan musician Chris Perry. Nazareth initially faced opposition from her in-laws concerning her involvement in stage performances, but they ultimately relented and supported her pursuit of a career in acting. She conveys gratitude for the support and encouragement provided by her husband during her endeavors. Juggling the responsibilities of her family and acting profession proved to be a challenge for Nazareth. Her participation in Goan shows often required her to be away from home for extended periods, spanning anywhere from one to two months.

To manage childcare, Nazareth relied on the assistance of a maid, and at times, a supportive aunt played a crucial role in providing help. Despite the demanding circumstances, she made various sacrifices to engage in theatrical productions. Commuting between Mumbai and Goa posed logistical challenges, and even during rehearsals, her thoughts revolved around her children. After welcoming her second son, Nazareth temporarily scaled back her acting engagements to focus on her family responsibilities. However, as her children matured, her passion and fervor for the theater reignited, drawing her back to the stage with renewed enthusiasm. As of 2012, Nazareth has established her residence in Bandra West, Mumbai.

Nazareth found herself assuming the role of sole caretaker for her two children, Aaron and Warren, following the death of her husband in 2004, However, since the boys had reached adulthood by then, her stage performances remained unaffected by this personal responsibility. By 2013, Aaron, the firstborn, had obtained a position at an oil rig firm, whereas Warren had entered matrimony and established a stable lifestyle in Canada. Nazareth harbored a single unfulfilled aspiration-to act in a Bollywood movie. Despite this longing, she remained hopeful and refused to abandon her dreams entirely. Nazareth also shed light on the Maharashtra Konknni Kala Saunstha (MKKS) organization, where she serves as a treasurer. MKKS annually organized a range of cultural events, including tiatrs, musical shows, one-act plays, singing competitions, and a mando festival. Nazareth emphasized the importance of preserving and revitalizing Konkani theater, expressing concern over its gradual decline in Mumbai. She called upon the residents of Mumbai, urging them to embrace their native language, Konkani, and support the revival of tiatrs-a once deeply rooted art form.
