= Tere Bina =

Tere Bina (lit. 'Without You') may refer to:

- "Tere Bina" (song), a 2006 song by A. R. Rahman, Murtuza Khan, Quadir Khan and Chinmayi from the 2007 Indian film Guru
- "Tere Bina", a 2023 song by Indo-Canadian rapper Sukha
- Tere Bina (TV series), a Pakistani TV series

== See also ==
- Tere Bin (disambiguation)
- Without You (disambiguation)
