= Tere Bin =

Tere Bin (lit. 'Without You') may refer to:

== Songs ==
- "Tere Bin", a song by Atif Aslam from the film Bas Ek Pal, 2006
- "Tere Bin", a song by Rabbi Shergill
- "Tere Bin Nahin Lagda", a song by Nusrat Fateh Ali Khan, 1996
  - "Tere Bin", a cover version of the song in film Simmba, 2018

== Television series ==
- Tere Bin (2016 TV series), an Indian Hindi-language drama series
- Tere Bin (2022 TV series), a Pakistani romantic drama series

== See also ==
- Tere Bina (disambiguation)
- Without You (disambiguation)
