= 826aska =

Japanese musician (born 2001)

- Born: August 26, 2001 (age 25)
- Origin: Sabae, Fukui, Japan
- Genre: J-pop
- Occupation: Musician
- Instrument: Electric organ
- Label: Yamaha Music Communications
- Website: 826aska.com

826aska (はちにいろくあすか, Hachiniiroku Asuka; born August 26, 2001) is a Japanese electric organist from Fukui Prefecture. Her 2019 debut album, DEPARTURE, and her 2020 follow-up, possible, have both charted on the Oricon Albums Chart.

== Early life ==
826aska hails from Sabae, Fukui Prefecture. She began to play piano at the age of five. 826aska began to play electric organ at the age of eight and post videos of her performance on YouTube.

== Career ==
On December 31, 2015, 826aska posted a YouTube video of her performing a Star Wars theme medley on the electric organ. The video went viral, earning over one million views in less than a month and garnering media attention for 826aska.

After that, she appeared in Japanese TV programs Miyaneya in May 2016 and Nakai kun no manabu switch hosted by Masahiro Nakai in September 2018.

826aska released her debut album, DEPARTURE, in March 2019. Continuing from the previous year, she went on a nation-wide tour in 2019.

== Discography ==
=== Albums ===
Year	Information	Oricon weekly peak position	Sales
2019	Departure: Released: March 27, 2019; Label: Yamaha Music Communications; Formats: CD, CD+DVD, digital	33	
2020	Possible: Released: March 25, 2020; Label: Yamaha Music Communications; Formats: CD, CD+BD, CD+BD+DVD, digital	36	
2021	Smile: Released: August 25, 2021; Label: Yamaha Music Communications; Formats: CD, CD+BD, CD+BD+DVD, digital	24	
2023	With You: Released: May 24, 2023; Label: Yamaha Music Communications; Formats: CD, CD+BD, digital	38	JPN: 1,570
2025	Infinity: Released: October 1, 2025; Label: Yamaha Music Communications; Formats: CD, CD+BD, CD+DVD, digital	34	JPN: 1,545

== Videography ==
Year	Information	Oricon weekly Blu-ray peak position	Sales
2022	826aska 20th Anniversary Live Tour "Smile": Released: April 13, 2022; Label: Yamaha Music Communications; Formats: BD, BD+CD	14	
2023	826aska Live Tour 2022/2023: SSS: Released: October 4, 2023; Label: Yamaha Music Communications; Formats: BD, BD+CD		
