= Gudigar =

Group of people residing in the state of Karnataka, India

Gudigar or Gudigara are a group of people residing in the state of Karnataka, India.
