= With You (826aska album) =

- Type 1 CD+BD cover

Studio album by 826aska
- Released: May 24, 2023
- Recorded: January 14, 2023 (tracks 8–9)
- Venue: Osaka Namba Hatch (tracks 8–9)
- Studio: Sound Arts
- Genre: J-pop
- Length: 44:16
- Label: Yamaha Music Communications

826aska chronology
Smile (2021)	With You (2023)	Infinity (2025)

Alternative cover
- Type 2 CD only cover

With You is the fourth studio album by Japanese electric organist 826aska, released by Yamaha Music Communications on May 24, 2023. The album consists of Electone covers of popular film, TV, and anime themes, as well as two original compositions by 826aska herself. It is available in two editions: CD only and CD with Blu-ray.

The album peaked at No. 38 on Oricon's weekly albums chart.

== Track listing ==
CD
No.	Title	Writer(s)	Original work	Length
1.	"With You"	826aska		4:40
2.	"Back to the Future (バック・トゥ・ザ・フューチャー, Bakku tu za Fyūchā)"	Alan Silvestri	Back to the Future	3:18
3.	"Friend Like Me (フレンド・ライク・ミー, Furendo Raiku Mī)" (Stageplay Version)	Alan Menken; Howard Ashman	Aladdin	2:37
4.	"Jounetsu Tairiku (情熱大陸; "Passion Continent")" (with Pia-no-jaC)	Taro Hakase	Jounetsu Tairiku	3:19
5.	"Unicorn"	Hiroyuki Sawano	Mobile Suit Gundam Unicorn	4:04
6.	"Wonderful Guys (Seibu Keisatsu Part II Theme) (西部警察PARTIIテーマ ワンダフル・ガイズ, Seibu Keisatsu Part II Tēma Wandafuru Gaizu)"	Kentarō Haneda	Seibu Keisatsu Part II	3:12
7.	"Symphonic Another Sky"	Hakase		5:10

CD Bonus tracks
No.	Title	Writer(s)	Original work	Length
8.	"Hakase-chan (博士ちゃん)" (Live)	Hakase	Sandwichman to Ashida Mana no Hakase-chan	6:11
9.	"Can't Take My Eyes Off You (君の瞳に恋してる, Kimi no Hitomi ni Koishiteru)" (Live)	Bob Crewe; Bob Gaudio		6:55
10.	"Chīsana Sora wo Te no Hira ni (小さな空を手のひらに; "A Small Sky in the Palm of Your Hand")"	826aska		4:48
Total length:				44:16

Blu-ray: Special Visual Contents
No.	Title	Length
1.	"With You" (Music video)
2.	"CD Sleeve & Music Video Making & Off Shot"
3.	"826aska Live Tour -SSS-"
4.	"Short Film in Odaiba"
5.	"Bonus Video: 826aska Live Tour -SSS- Official Pamphlet Making & Off Shot"

== Charts ==
Chart performance for With You
Chart (2023)	Peak position
Japanese Albums (Oricon)	38
Japanese Hot Albums (Billboard Japan)	42
