= Without Your Love =

Without Your Love may refer to:

== Albums ==
- Without Your Love (Dionne Warwick album) or the title song, 1985
- Without Your Love (oOoOO album) or the title song, 2013
- Without Your Love, by Guji Lorenzana, 2007

== Songs ==
- "Without Your Love" (Aaron Tippin song), 1996
- "Without Your Love" (André song), representing Armenia at Eurovision 2006
- "Without Your Love" (Gary O'Shaughnessy song), representing Ireland at Eurovision 2001
- "Without Your Love" (Roger Daltrey song), 1980
- "Without Your Love" (Toto song), 1986
- "Without Your Love", by Lady Kash, 2013
- "Without Your Love", by Barbra Streisand from Guilty Pleasures
- "Without Your Love", by Blackjack from Blackjack
- "Without Your Love", by Chris Stapleton from From A Room: Volume 1
- ”Without Your Love”, by Ellie Goulding from the deluxe edition of her album Halcyon
- "Without Your Love", by Enuff Z'nuff from Tweaked
- "Without Your Love", by Kumi Koda from Gentle Words
- "Without Your Love", by Lady Kash
- "Without Your Love", by Magnum from Kingdom of Madness
- "Without Your Love", by Neil Sedaka from 3 Great Guys
- "Without Your Love", by TNT from Knights of the New Thunder
- "Without Your Love", by Tom Novy with Adrian Misiewicz and Lima
