= Janalynn Castelino =

Italian-Indian singer and songwriter (born 1998)

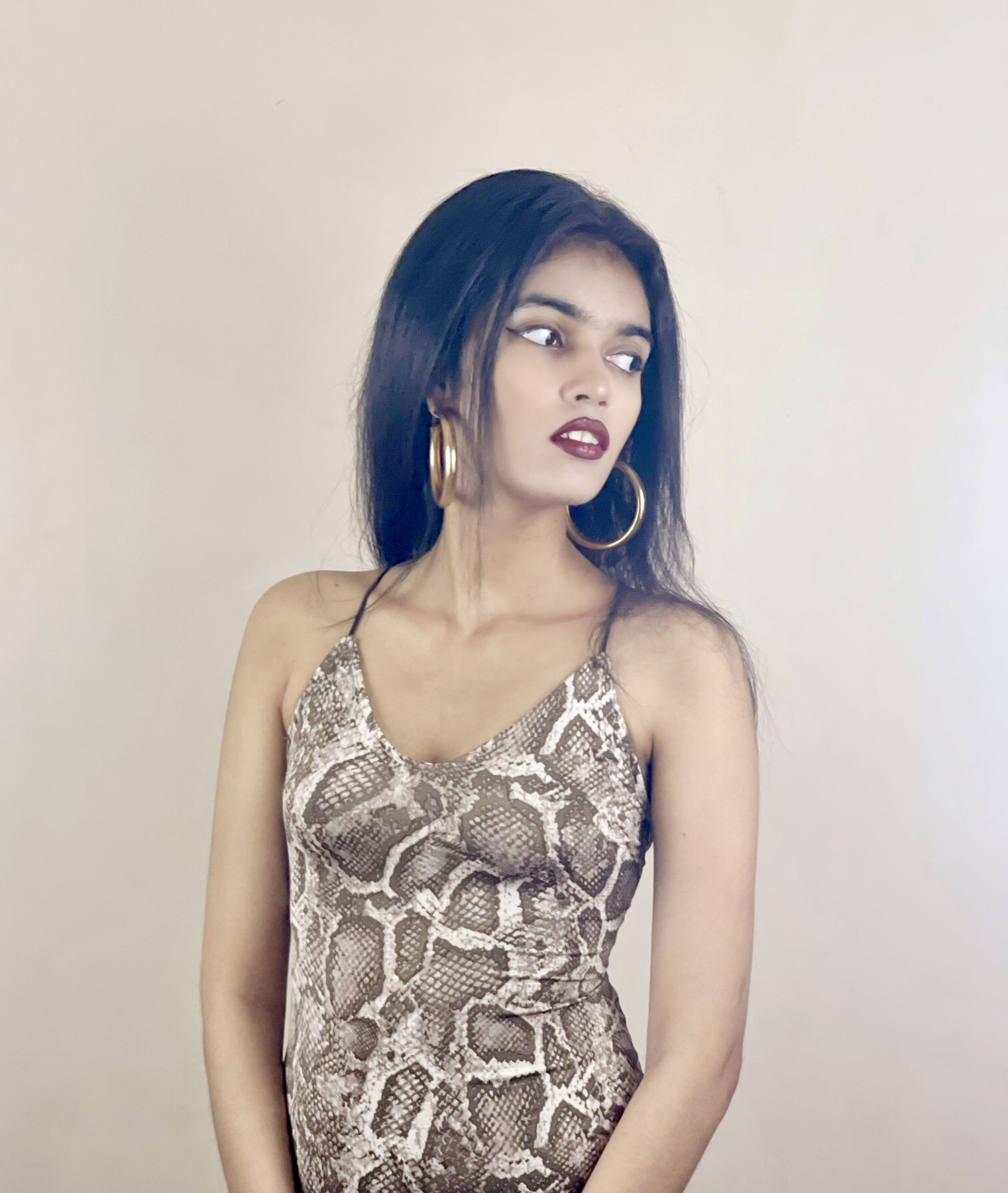
- Castelino in 2023
- Born: Janalynn Joseph Castelino; October 18, 1998 (age 28)
- Occupations: Singer; songwriter
- Years active: 2018–present
- Musical career
- Genres: Pop; R&B; Soul
- Instruments: Vocals
- Website: www.janalynncastelino.com

Janalynn Castelino (born 18 October 1998) is an Italian-Indian pop singer-songwriter and doctor. She made her international crossover debut in 2024, with the Spanish-language single "Drama". Her music has been described as pop with R&B elements. Castelino has recorded in many languages including English, Latin, Italian, Spanish and Hindi.

== Early life and education ==
Janalynn Joseph Castelino was born on 18 October 1998 in a Roman Catholic family, to parents Lorna and Joseph Castelino. She is of Italian and Indian descent. She was involved in performing arts since the age of 3 and sang in the church choir. As a student, Janalynn secured a merit of 96.36% in the 10th Grade Secondary School Certificate, becoming the board exam topper of her school as well as the zone.

Castelino excelled in studies and didn’t consider music as a profession thoughtfully, then. She graduated as a doctor and took further studies at the University of Michigan.

== Career ==
=== 2019–2024: Early career beginnings ===
Castelino uploaded covers to her YouTube Channel as a hobby while studying medicine. She gained popularity in 2018, after uploading the music video Binte Dil (Love Ballad) to her YouTube Channel that garnered over 22 Million views on YouTube, followed by her popular cover of Fire On Fire. Her music videos featured on YouTube's trending charts in across more than 11 countries. Janalynn's rendition of Takeaway by the Chainsmokers was described by the media as a 'recreation with a pop twist'.

Janalynn Castelino appeared in an interview on the American Songwriter Network in 2021, where she talked about her upcoming music projects. In the same year, she featured on the English edition of the L'idea Magazine.

In 2023, Janalynn released her Italian-Folk ballad "Bella Ci Dormi" blending elements of world music with traditional folk, delivering the track in Sicilian dialect. The single was characterised by high-pitched vocals and layered harmonies.

=== 2024: Religious music, Spanish debut single ‘Drama’ ===
In the first quarter of 2024, Castelino released three consecutive religious music singles during the Lenten season. These included "Jesu Salvator Mundi" that released on February 16, 2024 and "Parce Domine" both of which were recorded in Latin and rendered in Baroque style with three voices soprano, alto and bass. CCM Magazine described Janalynn's vocals on "Parce Domine" as impactful and encapsulating reverence.

These were followed by a soulful version of the Crucifixion hymn "The Old Rugged Cross" recorded in English.

On 20 September that year, she marked her Spanish-language debut with pop single "Drama" that released during the Hispanic heritage month. An official music video was released on 18 October 2024 via Janalynn’s YouTube channel, coinciding with her 26th birthday.

=== 2025: Expansion to pop career ===
Janalynn released her pop single But Without You on March 21, 2025. The song received positive response from media critics with her songwriting regarded as ‘emotive' drawing from soul, while Janalynn’s vocal style was described as being powerful yet deeply expressive.

On 20 February 2026, she released the dance-pop single, "Que Me Ha Pasado". An official visual video was released soon after on 19 March 2026.

Castelino released the global pop single "Can't Deny" on June 26, 2026. A "Lifted Mix" version of the track followed on August 10, 2026, accompanied by a music video that premiered on Vevo. Jack Rush of Rattler Magazine wrote, "Can't Deny succeeds because it does more than make you want to dance." Reviewing the single, Parkett wrote, "Vocally, Castelino brings a refreshing sense of personality that elevates the entire composition." Later, the EP Can't Deny was released on August 7, 2026.

== Artistry ==
=== Voice ===
Janalynn has been described as a soprano, gliding into upper vocal registers with ease. Critics have described her voice as emotive, luscious and high-pitched. CCM Magazine described her vocals as 'impactful'. L'idea in its English edition mentioned Castelino's voice as sounding aesthetically powerful yet emotional.

=== Music style ===
Castelino is referred to as a pop artist who incorporates elements of R&B and soul. Her music often carries linguistic diversity and cultural influences from her Italian-Indian ancestry.

== Personal life ==
Castelino is a practicing Roman Catholic. As of 2021, she lived in Mumbai. She is based in Los Angeles.

== Discography ==
=== Extended plays ===
- Can't Deny (2026)

=== Singles ===
Year	Title	Language	Release date
2023	Bella Ci Dormi	Italian	4 August 2023
2023	O Come All Ye Faithful	English	11 December 2023
2024	Jesu Salvator Mundi	Latin	16 February 2024
2024	The Old Rugged Cross	English	1 March 2024
2024	Parce Domine	Latin	21 March 2024
2024	Drama	Spanish	20 September 2024
2025	But Without You	English	21 March 2025
2026	Que Me Ha Pasado	Spanish	20 February 2026
2026	Can't Deny	English	26 June 2026
