= Without You I'm Nothing =

Without You I'm Nothing may refer to:

== Film and television ==
- Without You I'm Nothing (film), a 1990 film by Sandra Bernhard
- Without You I'm Nothing, an upcoming film written by and starring Robin Bain
- "Without You I'm Nothing", an episode of the TV series Ferris Bueller

== Music and theatre ==
- Without You I'm Nothing (Placebo album), 1998
  - "Without You I'm Nothing" (song), the title track
- Without You I'm Nothing (Sandra Bernhard album), 1987
- "Without You I'm Nothing", a song by Eric Saade from Saade Vol. 2
- "Without You, I'm Nothing", a song from the 1956 musical Mr Wonderful

== See also ==
- Without You I'm Nothing, With You I'm Not Much Better, a 1988 off-Broadway show by Sandra Bernhard, basis for the album and film above
- "Sin ti no soy nada" ("Without You I'm Nothing"), a song by Amaral from Estrella de mar
