= With You =

With You or With U may refer to:

== Music ==
- With You., an American house music group

=== Albums ===
- With You (826aska album) or the title song, 2023
- With You (Stacy Lattisaw album) or the title song, 1981
- With You, by Josh Groban, 2007
- With You, by Natalie Walker, 2008
- With U (BigBang EP) or the title song, 2008
- With U (Holy Other EP) or the title song, 2011

=== Songs ===
- "With You" (Charly McClain song), 1982
- "With You" (Chris Brown song), 2007
- "With You" (Davido song), 2025
- "With You" (De Fam song), 2015
- "With You" (Demis Roussos song), 1974
- "With You" (Elevation Worship song), 2019
- "With You" (Irving Berlin song), 1929
- "With You" (Jay Sean song), 2019
- "With You" (Jessica Simpson song), 2003
- "With You" (Jimin song), 2022
- "With You" (Kaskade and Meghan Trainor song), 2019
- "With You" (Lila McCann song), 1999
- "With You" (Mariah Carey song), 2018
- "With You" (Matt Simons song), 2012
- "With You" (The Subways song), 2005
- "With You" (Tony Terry song), 1991
- "With-you", by La'cryma Christi, 1998
- "With U", by Janet Jackson, 2006
- "With You", by Aly & AJ from Ten Years, 2017
- "With You", by AP Dhillon, 2023
- "With You", by Ashley Walters, 2009
- "With You", by Exo from Don't Mess Up My Tempo, 2018
- "With You", by Drake from Views, 2016
- "With You", by Gawvi from Panorama, 2018
- "With You", by Keith Urban from The Speed of Now Part 1, 2020
- "With You", by Kygo from Kids in Love, 2017
- "With You", by Lil Wayne from I Am Not a Human Being, 2010
- "With You", by Linkin Park from Hybrid Theory, 2000
- "With You", by LMFAO from Sorry for Party Rocking, 2011
- "With You", by Monica from Miss Thang, 1995
- "With You", by the New Romantics, featuring Maia Lee, 2008
- "With You", by Prince from Prince, 1979
- "With You", by Red Velvet from Summer Magic, 2018

== Television ==
- With You (Chinese TV series), a 2016 streaming teen drama series
- With You (Singaporean TV series), a 2010 drama series
- With You (South Korean TV series), a 2014–2017 reality show

== See also ==
- Aap Ke Saath (lit. 'With You'), a 1986 Indian film by J. Om Prakash
- Tere Sang (lit. 'With You'), a 2009 Indian film
- "Tere Sang Yaara" (lit. 'With You Lover'), a song from the 2016 Indian film Rustom
