= Pili Yesa =

Karnataka folk dance

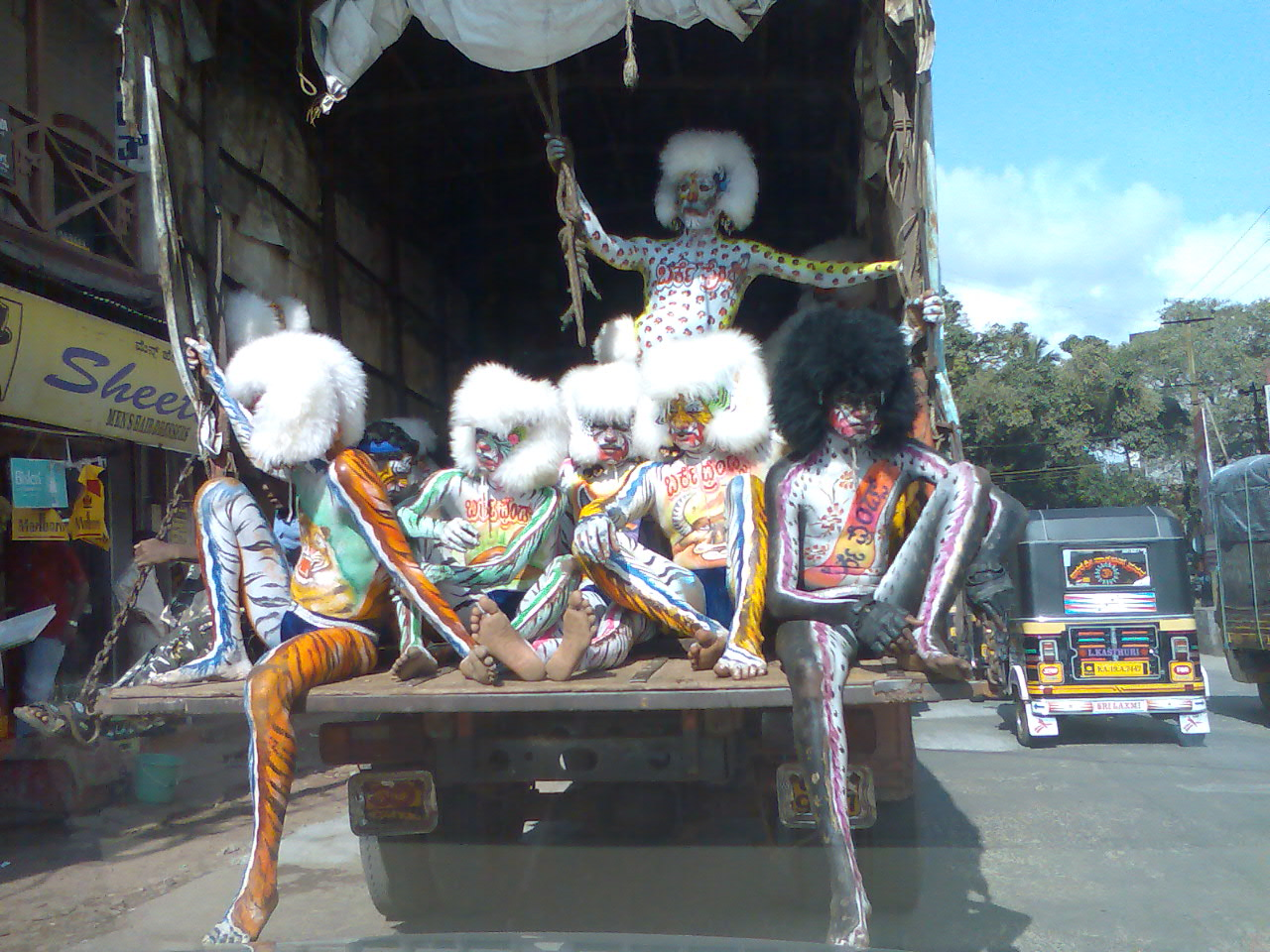
A group of boys painted and in tiger costumes on the way to the Mangalore Dasara procession in Mangalore

Pilivēṣa in "Tiger Masque" is a folk dance unique in coastal Karnataka, India. Pilivēṣa is performed during Navratri to honour the Goddess Durga, whose favoured animal is the tiger (mārnemi). Mangalore Dasara is one of the festivals during which a large number of enthusiasts participate. It originated in Udupi District of Karnataka and was initially performed during the Krishna Janmashtami/Mosarukudike and Ganesha Chaturthi at Mangalore, Udupi, Moodabidri, Kundapur and many other places in Tulu Nadu.

== Troupes ==
Typically, young males form troupes of five to ten members or more. Three to five males are painted and costumed to look like tigers, and accompanied by a band called thaase in Tulu with two or three drummers. This troupe is accompanied by the manager of the group. During Navratri, these troupes roam the streets, with accompanying drum beats of their bands. They stop at homes and businesses or on the roadsides to perform for about ten minutes after which they collect money from the people who have observed their performance.

The troupes perform until the last day of Navratri, and almost all of them form part of the Sharada processions organized by temples such as Mangaladevi, Gokarnanatheshwara and Venkatramana temple. After the procession is over, performances are stopped and the paint is removed.

== Costumes ==
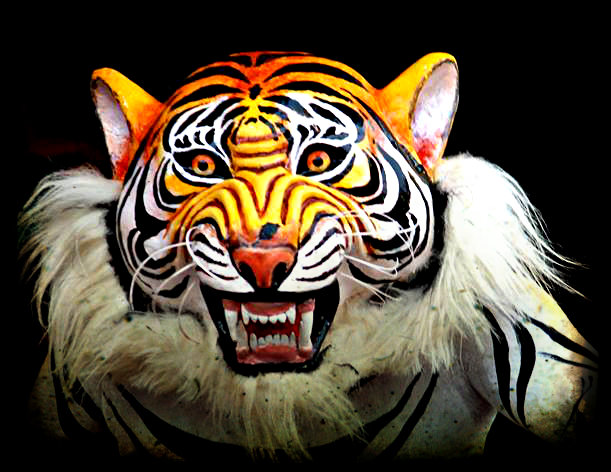
A Pilivesha Mask

While Pili means "tiger" in Tulu, dancers also painted themselves with leopard or cheetah motifs. The costumes vary depending on the place. Costumes in Mangalore differ from those in Udupi district. Each person wears just a knicker/shorts, which usually has a tiger-skin motif. The rest of his bare body and face is painted with designs that denote tigers, cheetahs, and leopards. A headgear or mask made of fake fur and sometimes a tail is worn to complete the ensemble.

The paint causes a burning sensation on the skin. But this is endured as part of the celebrations and also to earn extra money in the holiday season. Originally performers did this as a part of a religious vow. The paint was kept on the body for a couple of days and repainted or retouched as needed.

== Skills ==
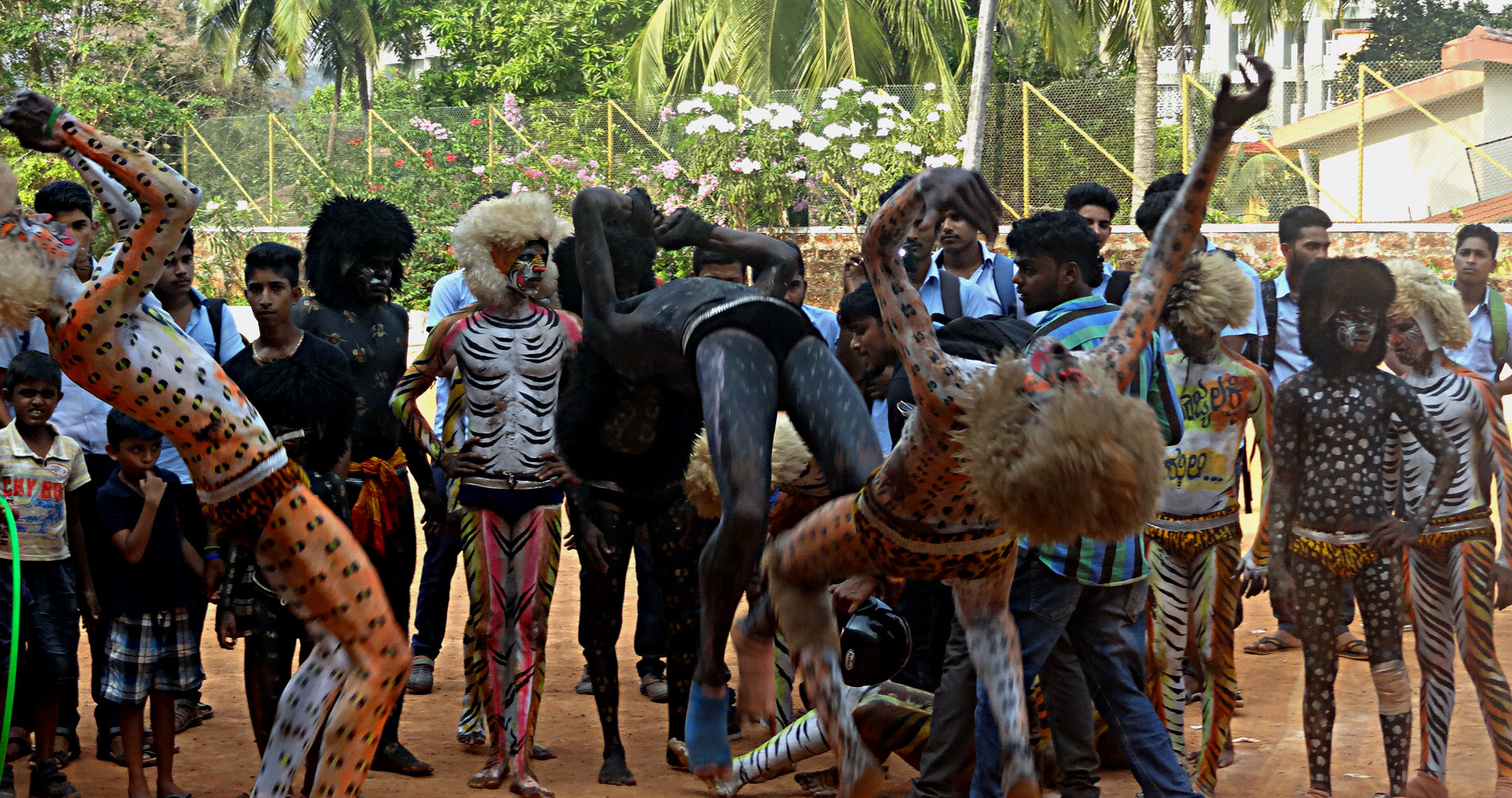
Piliyesha Dancers

Skill levels vary from person to person. The basic requirement is to know the tiger dance steps and to have enough stamina. Typical skills are Fire breathing, Hand walking, Handstands, gymnastic moves, picking money from mouth by bending backwards and lifting akkimudi (rice tied in straw, weighing 42 kg!) in their teeth and throwing it backwards etc.

== Popular culture ==
The 2014 Kannada movie Ulidavaru Kandanthe featured a tiger dance where one of the character (actor Achyuth Kumar) belonged to the Pilivesha troupe. A song titled "Pilivesha Beats" was dedicated to tiger dance.

The 2021 movie Garuda Gamana Vrishabha Vahana also had a brief history and featured Pili Vesha where the character of Shiva (actor Raj B. Shetty) performed the tiger dance, with the song "Sojugada sooju mallige".

== Gallery ==
Hulivesha/Pili Yesa Video

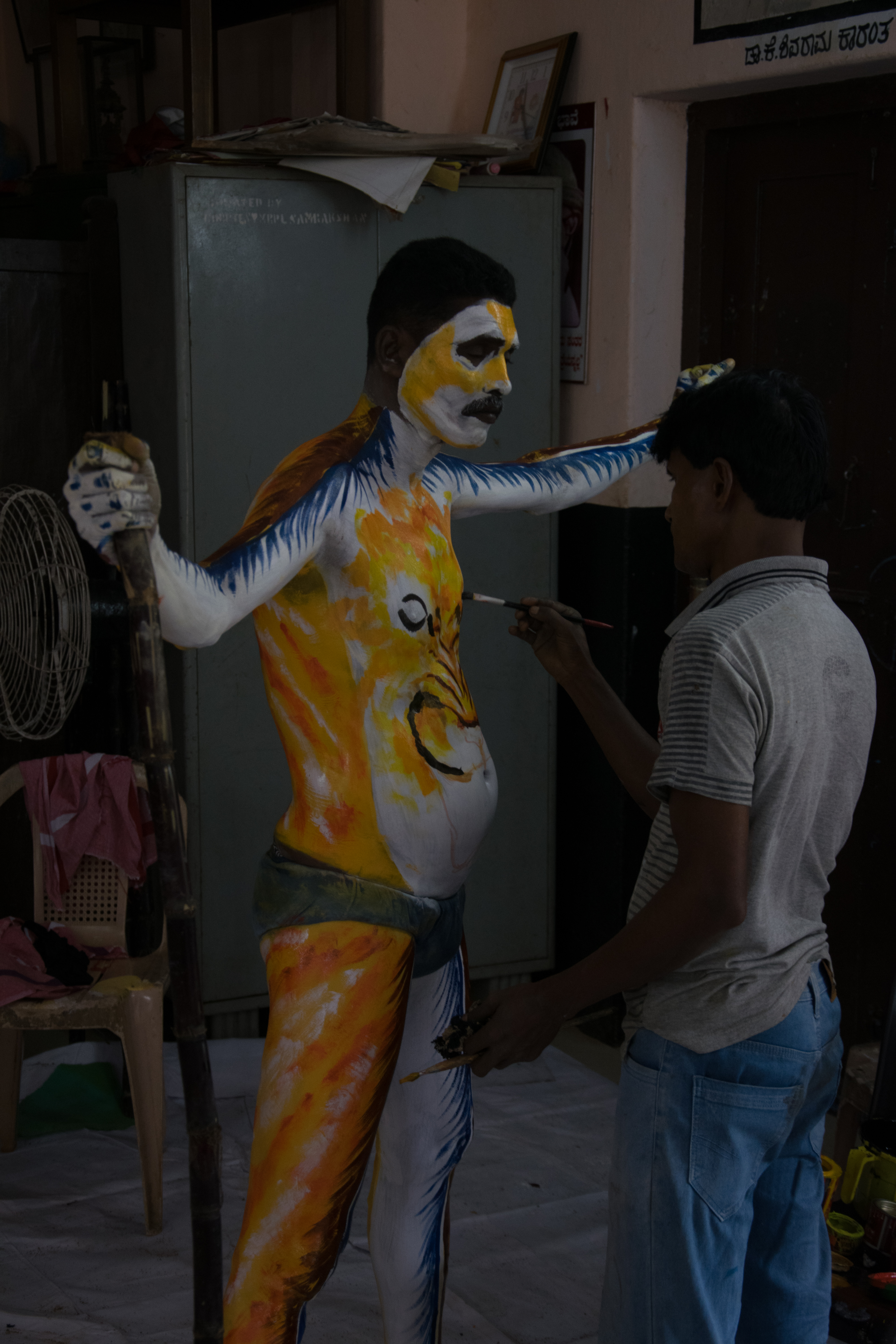
Pilivesa painting

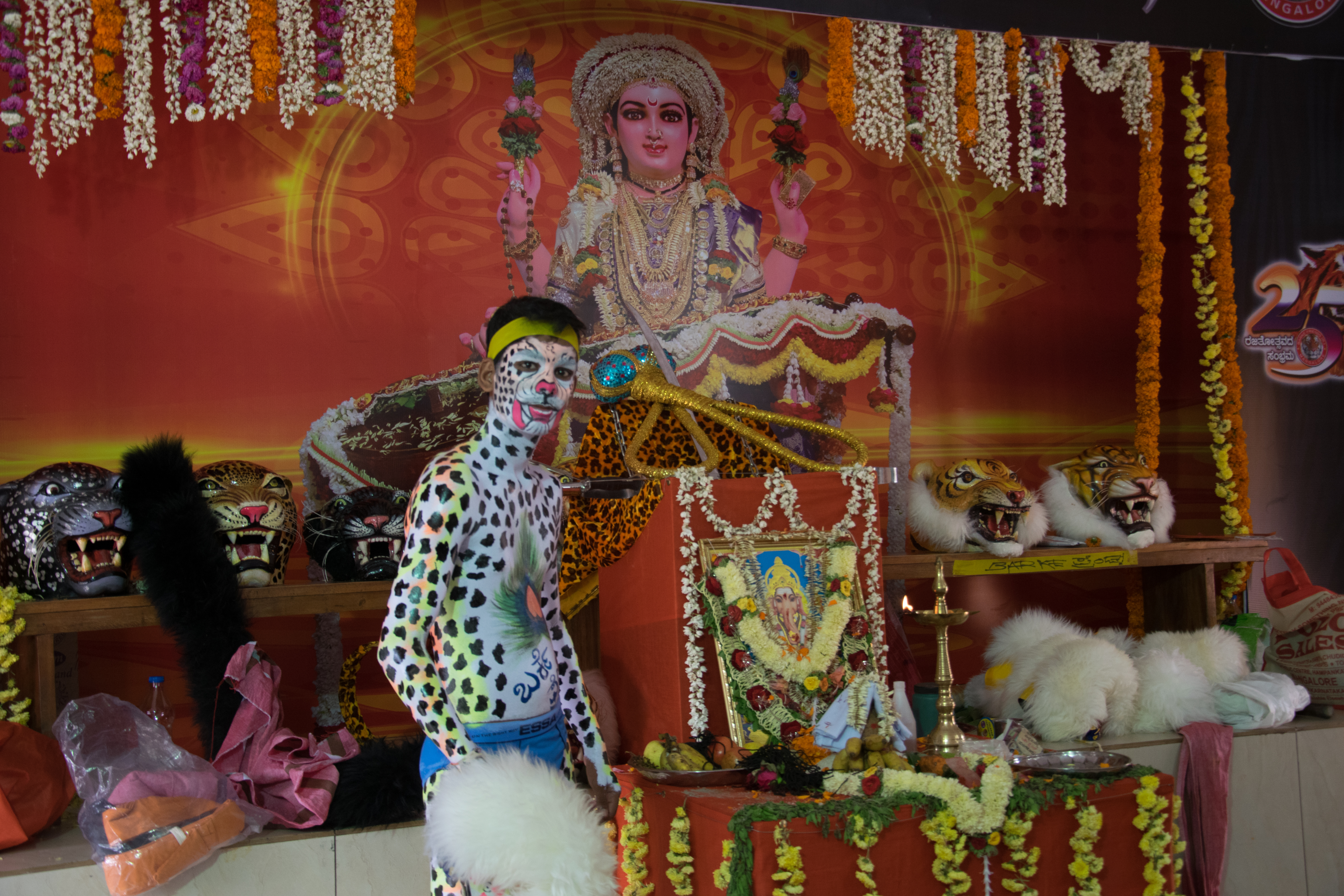
Pilivesa Painting Barke Friends

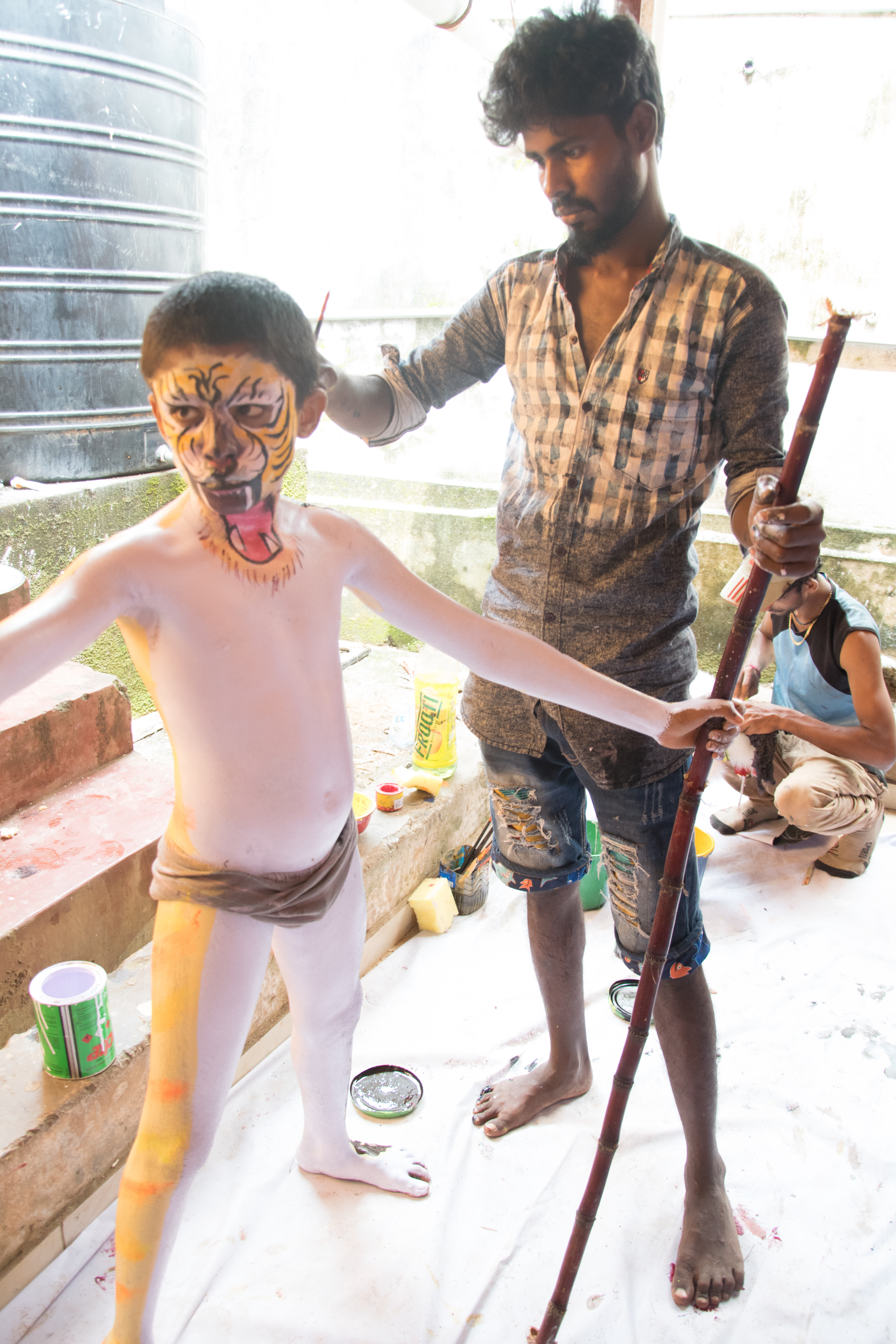
Pilivesa Painting Barke Friends

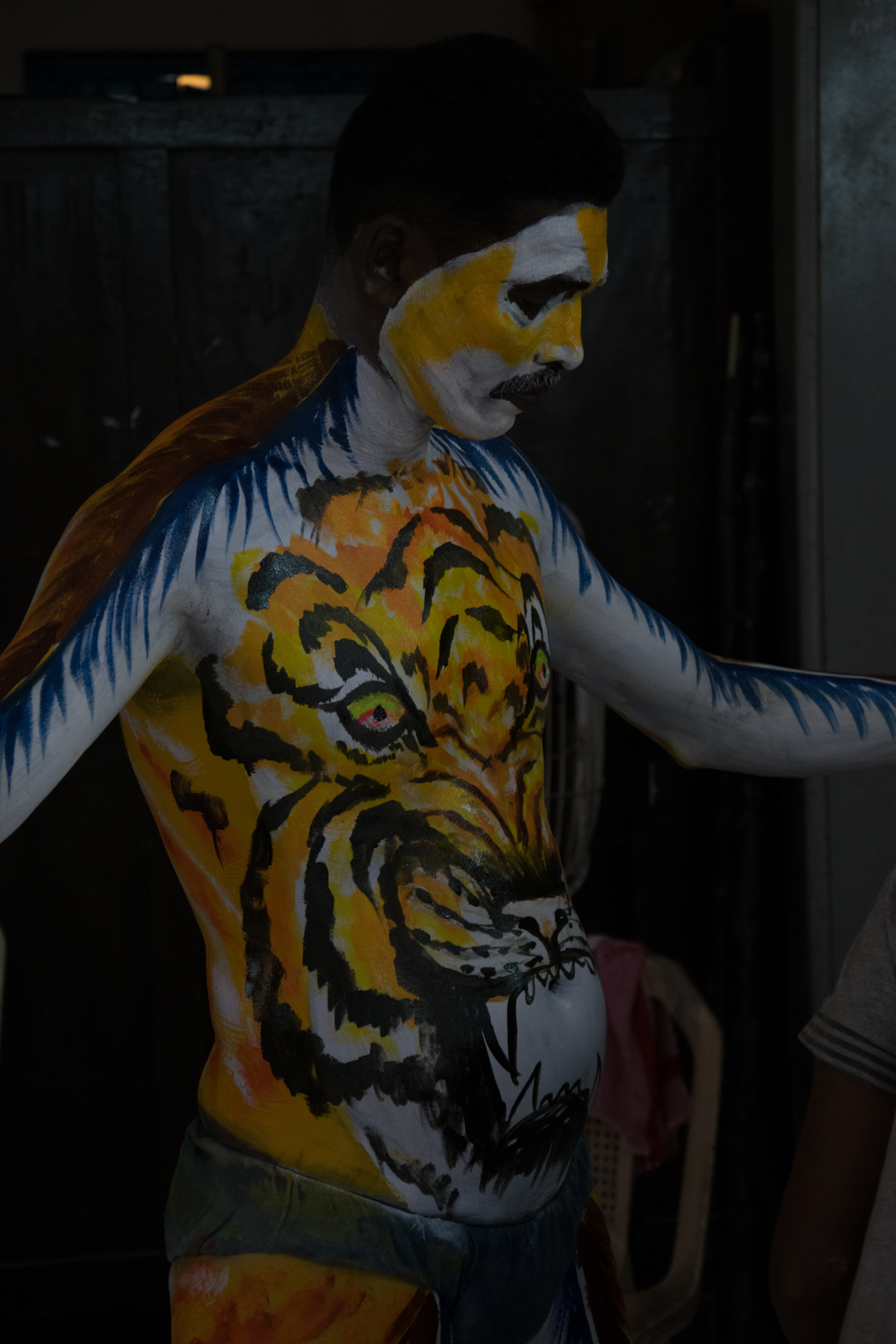
PilivesaPainting Appe pili

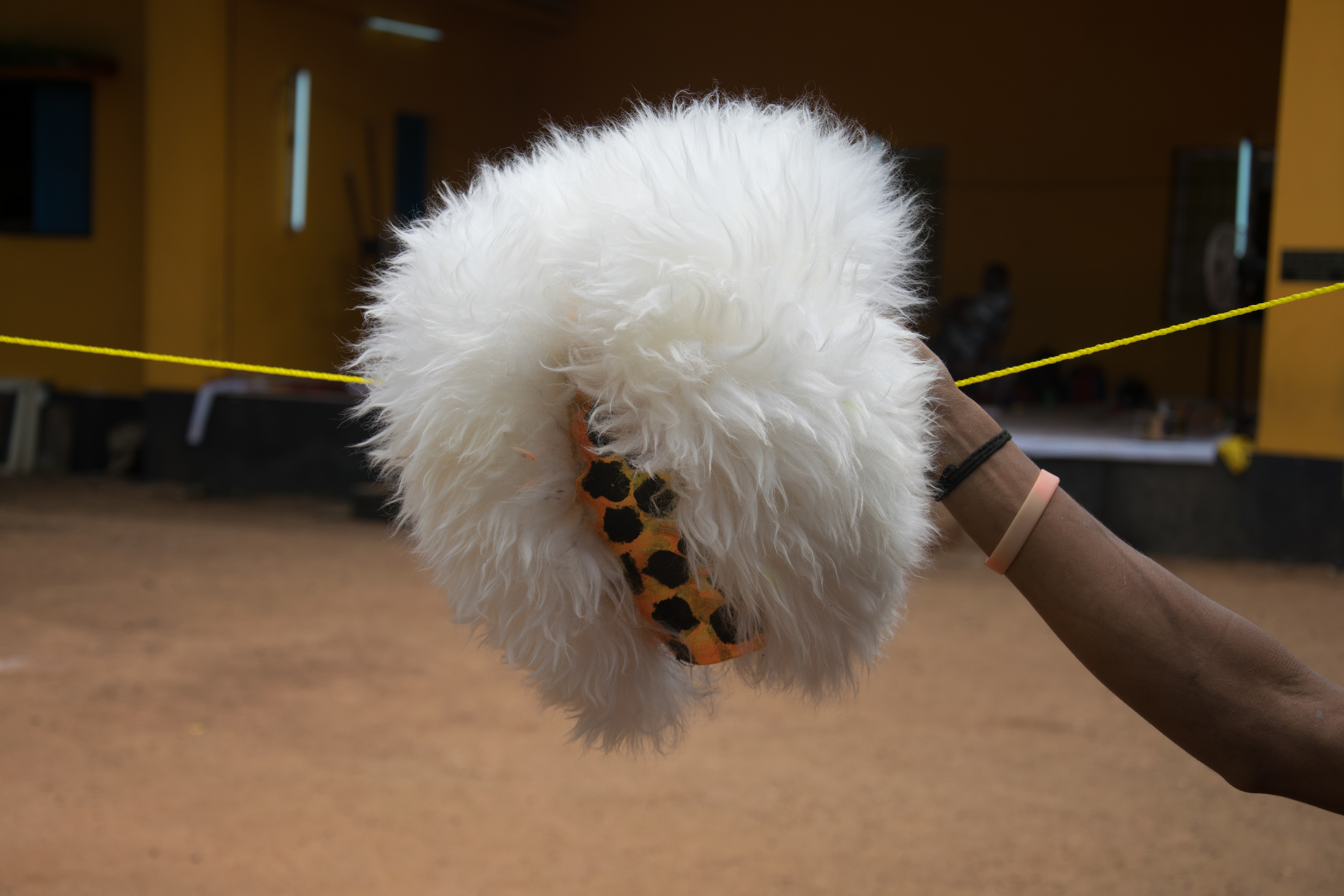
Pilivesamask

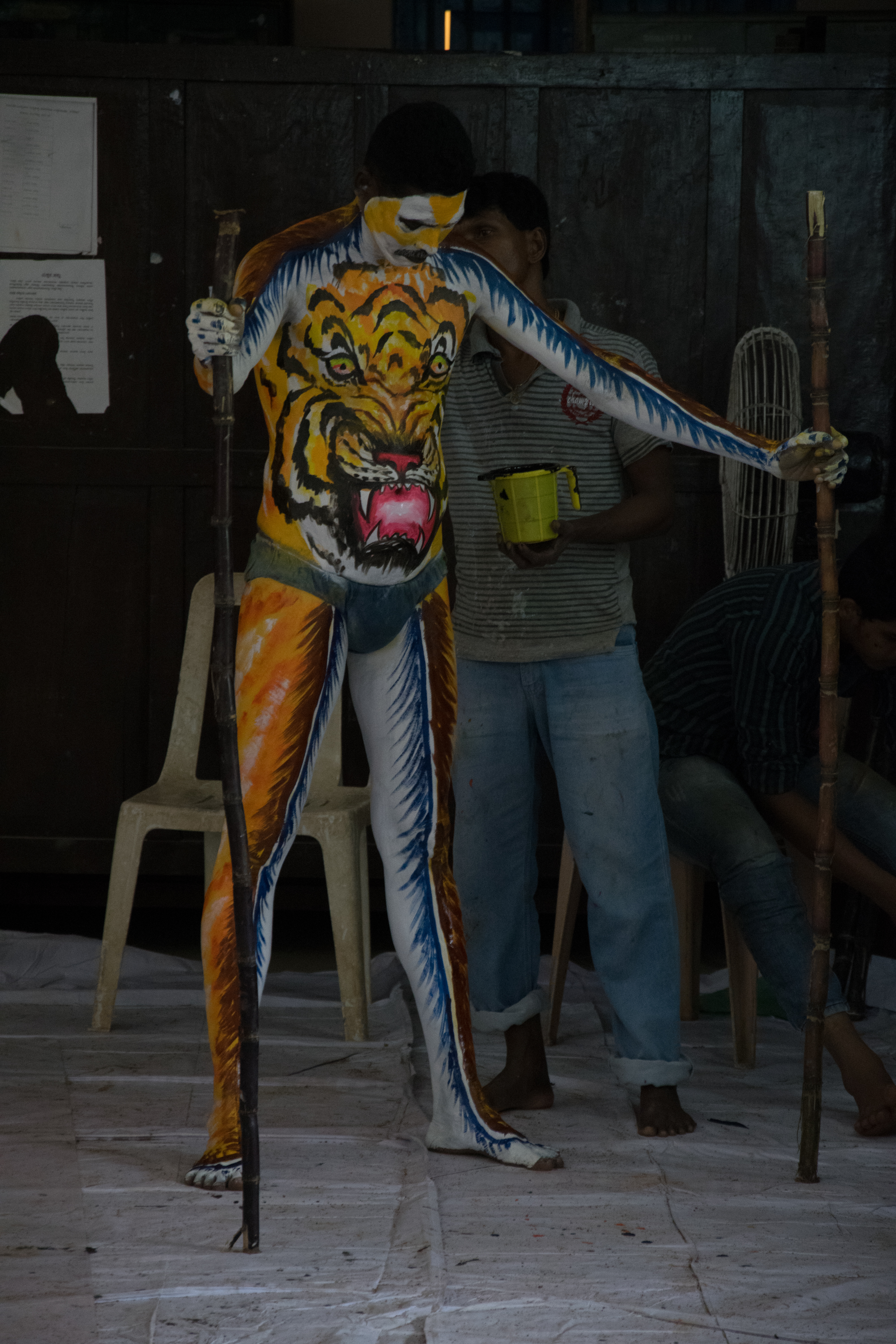
PilivesaPainting Barke Friends

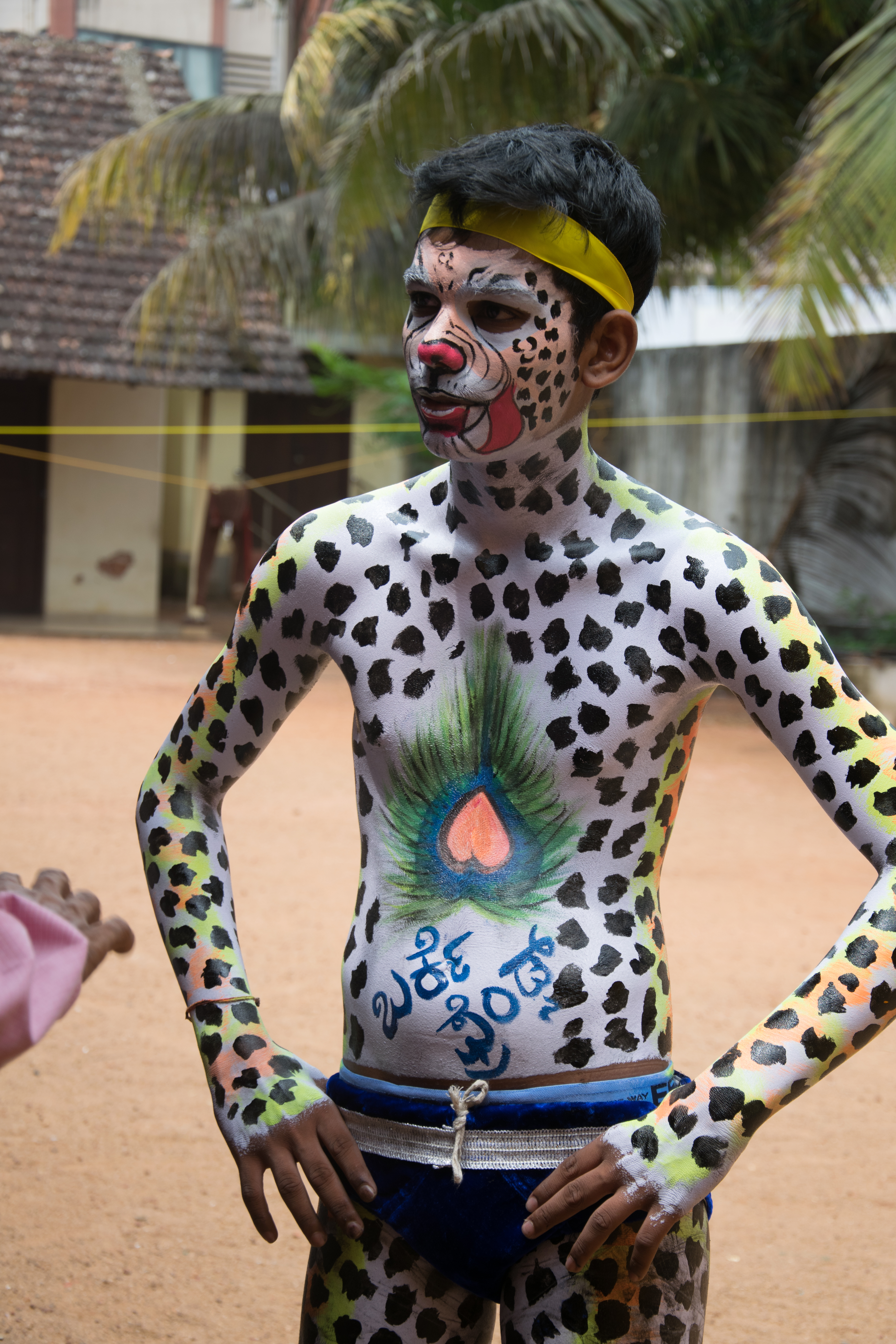
PilivesaPainting Barke Friends

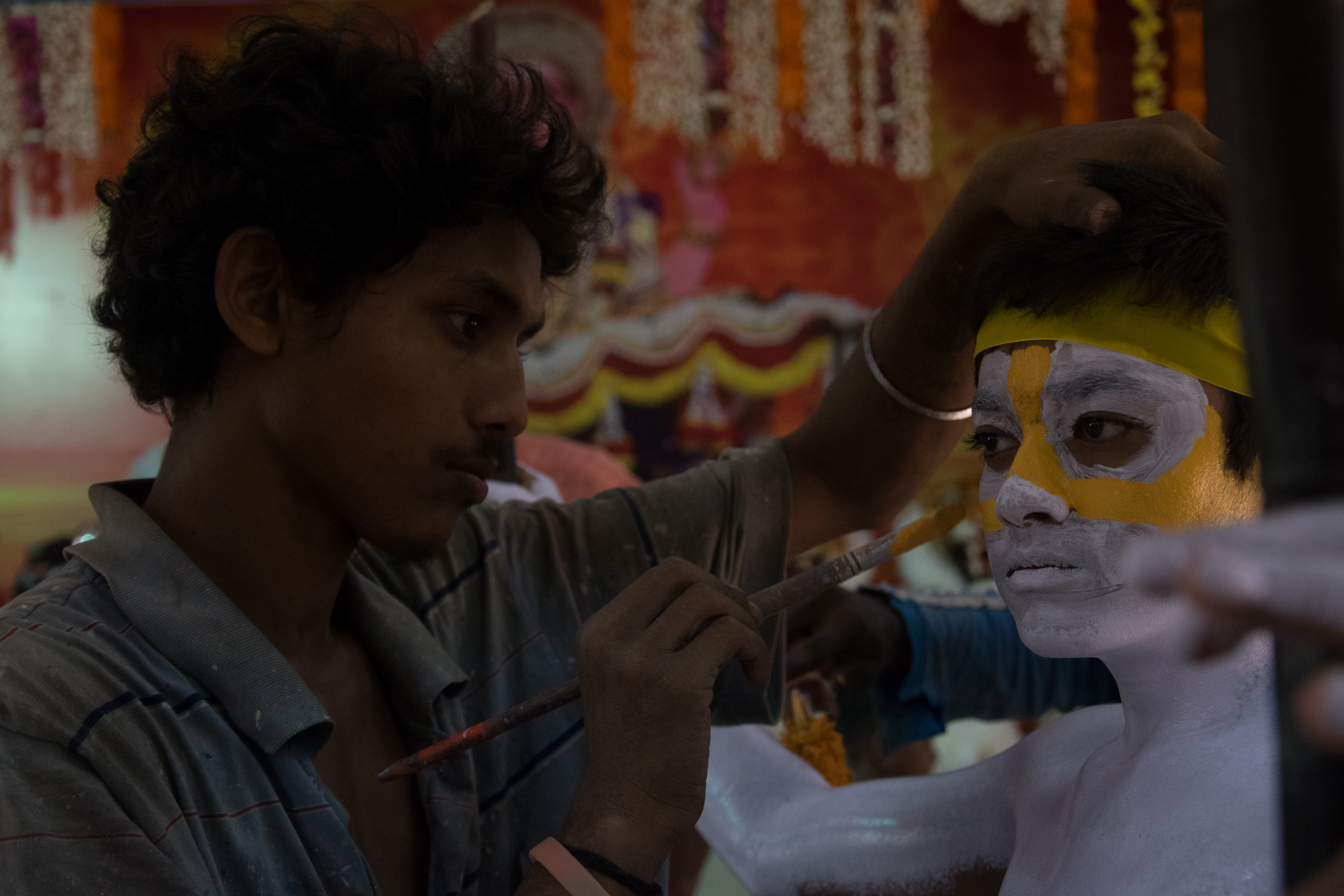
Pilivesa Painting for a kid

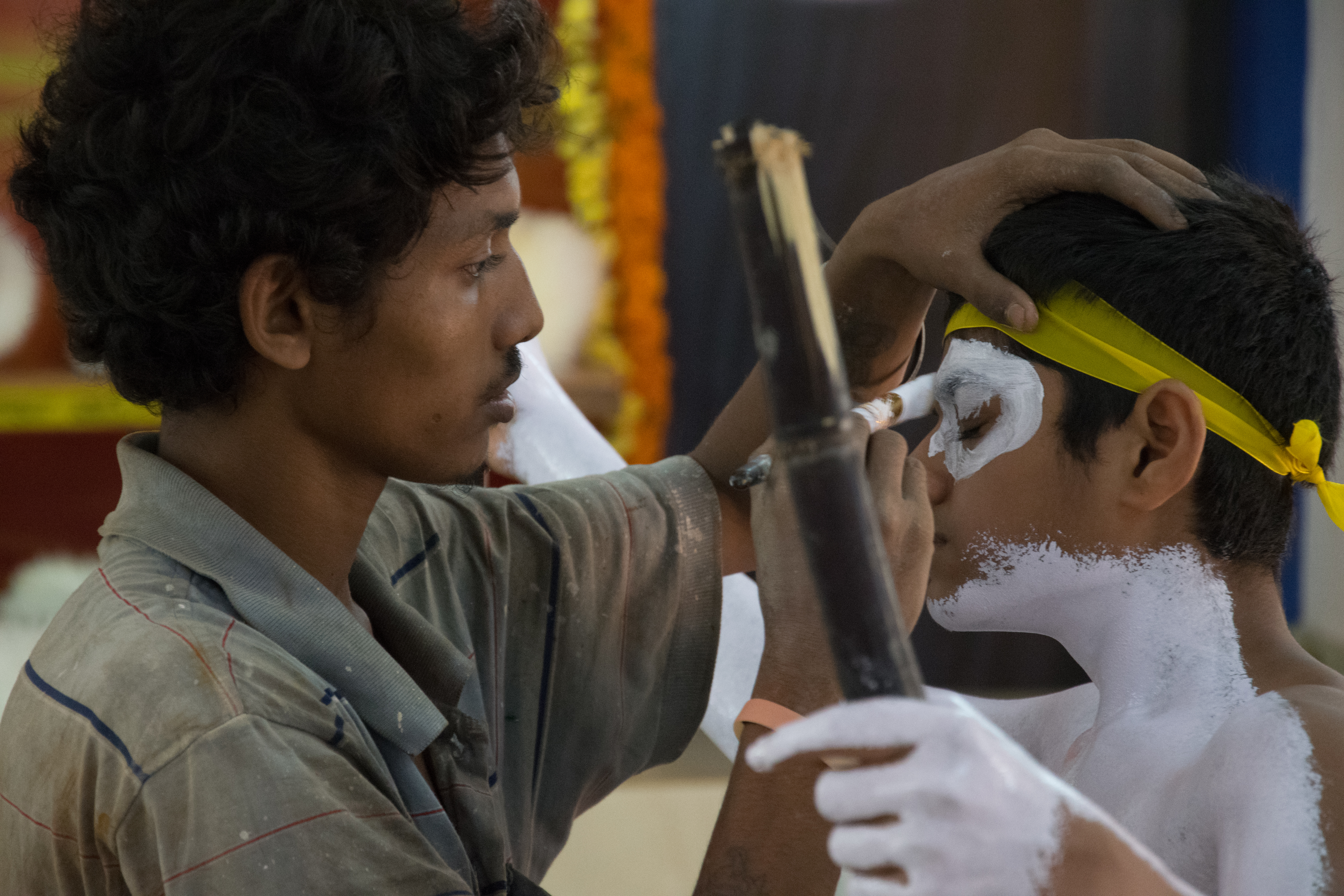
Painting Barke For a kid

== See also ==
- Puli Kali, a similar dance form in neighbouring Kerala
- Tulunadu Culture
- Mangalore Dasara
- Aati kalenja
- Bhuta Kola
