= Without Me =

Without Me may refer to:

- "Without Me" (Eminem song), 2002
- "Without Me" (Fantasia song), 2013
- "Without Me" (Halsey song), 2018
- "Without Me", a song by Collective Soul from See What You Started by Continuing, 2015
- "Without Me", a song by Dayseeker from Dark Sun, 2022
- "Mere Bina" (lit. 'Without Me'), a song by Pritam and Nikhil D'Souza from the 2010 Indian film Crook
