= Chicken ghee roast =

Indian chicken curry dish

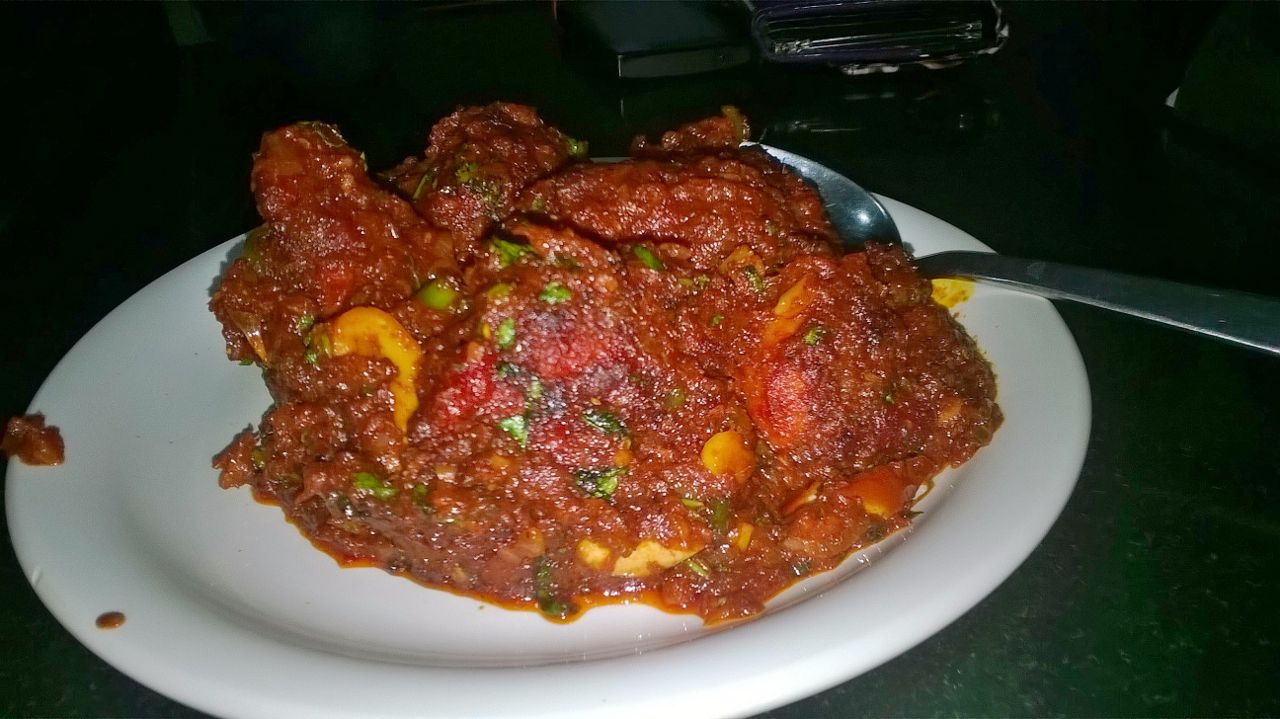
- Alternative names: Mangalorean Chicken Ghee Roast
- Type: Curry
- Course: Main Course
- Place of origin: Kundapur, India
- Region or state: Mangalorean cuisine
- Main ingredients: Chicken, Ghee, Roasted spices
- Variations: Dry, Semi-Gravy

Chicken Ghee Roast is a popular Tuluva Mangalorean chicken recipe whose origins go back to the town, Kundapur, close to Udupi. Chicken ghee roast is fiery red in colour, and has a tangy and spicy flavor with ghee and roasted spices.

A few key ingredients of chicken ghee roast are chicken, curds, onions, ghee, jaggery, tamarind, ginger, garlic and regional spices and condiments.
