= Neer dosa =

Type of dosa from Tulu Nadu, India

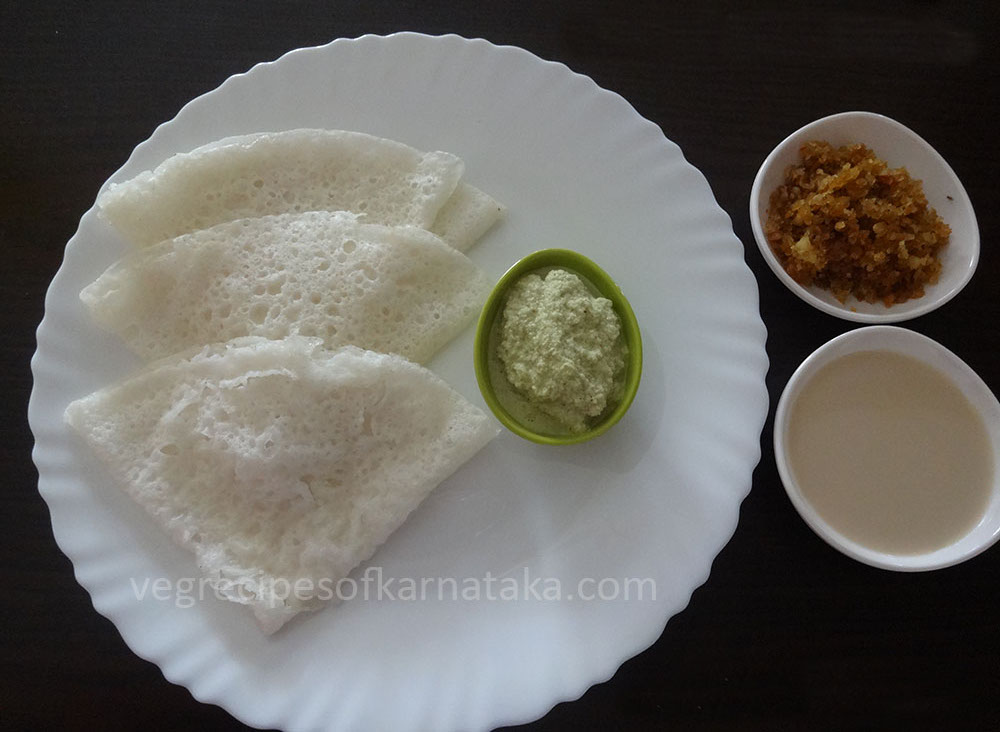
- Type: Dosa
- Place of origin: India
- Region or state: Tulu Nadu, Karnataka and Malabar, Kerala
- Main ingredients: Rice

Neer dosa, literally meaning water dosa in Kannada, Malayalam, and Tulu, is a crêpe prepared from rice batter. Neer dosa is a delicacy from Tulu Nadu in Karnataka and Malabar in Kerala, India and a part of Mangalorean and Malabar cuisine.

== Overview ==
Neer is the word for water in Tulu, Malayalam, Kannada.

Unlike other dosas neer dosa is known for its simple preparation method and lack of fermentation. Usually, neer dosa is served with coconut chutney, sambar, saagu and non vegetarian curries like chicken, mutton, fish and egg curry.

== Ingredients ==
Even though many variations exist for Neer Dosa batter, the two basic ingredients common to all of them are just soaked rice (or rice flour) and salt.

== Preparation ==
Fermentation of the rice is not required to prepare Neer dosa. The rice needs to be soaked for at least 2 hours. After a quick wash and a drain, the rice needs to be ground by adding water in order to get a very fine batter. Additional amount of water can be added based on the thickness of the batter and then salt is added for taste. Finally, the batter is used to prepare the dosa.

== See also ==
- List of Indian breads
