= But Without You =

2025 single by Janalynn Castelino

Single by Janalynn Castelino
- Language: English
- Released: 21 March 2025
- Genre: Pop; dance-pop
- Length: 3:06
- Label: Lorna Records Global
- Songwriter: Janalynn Castelino

Janalynn Castelino singles chronology
"Drama" (2024)	"But Without You" (2025)

Music video
- "But Without You" on YouTube

"But Without You" is a song by singer and songwriter Janalynn Castelino. It was released as a single on 21 March 2025, for streaming and digital download by Lorna Records Global. Written by Castelino, this pop and soul-influenced song speaks to her view that reconciliation is better than estrangement.

== Background and release ==
Recorded in English, "But Without You" was the follow-up to Castelino's previous Spanish-language single, "Drama".

Castelino teased the song in the second week of March 2025 by posting photos on Instagram from the set of the album's art session. She shared a snippet of the song on Instagram. Castelino released the official teaser on 18 March, which announced the release date and confirmed the title.

== Composition ==
"But Without You" was written and composed by Castelino. She confirmed in an interview that the lyrics were inspired by the idea of reconciliation being better than estrangement, observed through the circumstances experienced by her friends.

== Critical reception ==
"But Without You" was met with favorable response from music critics. The song has often been described by the media as "introspective" and "emotionally vulnerable." Janalynn's songwriting was described influenced by soul, while her vocal style was appreciated for being powerful and deeply expressive. AllNoise described the song as "emotionally infectious song that bounced between sentiment and chaos".

== Music video ==
The official lyric video accompanying the song was released on YouTube on 13 April 2025. The music video was released on 17 October 2025, and features Janalynn in variety of looks and cinematic settings, portraying emotional isolation.

== Charts ==
Weekly chart performance for "But Without You"
Chart (2025)	Peak position
Iceland (Tónlistinn)	28
New Zealand Hot Singles	20

== Release history ==
Region	Date	Format	Ref.
Various	21 March 2025	Digital download; streaming	
