= Tourist attractions in Mangaluru =

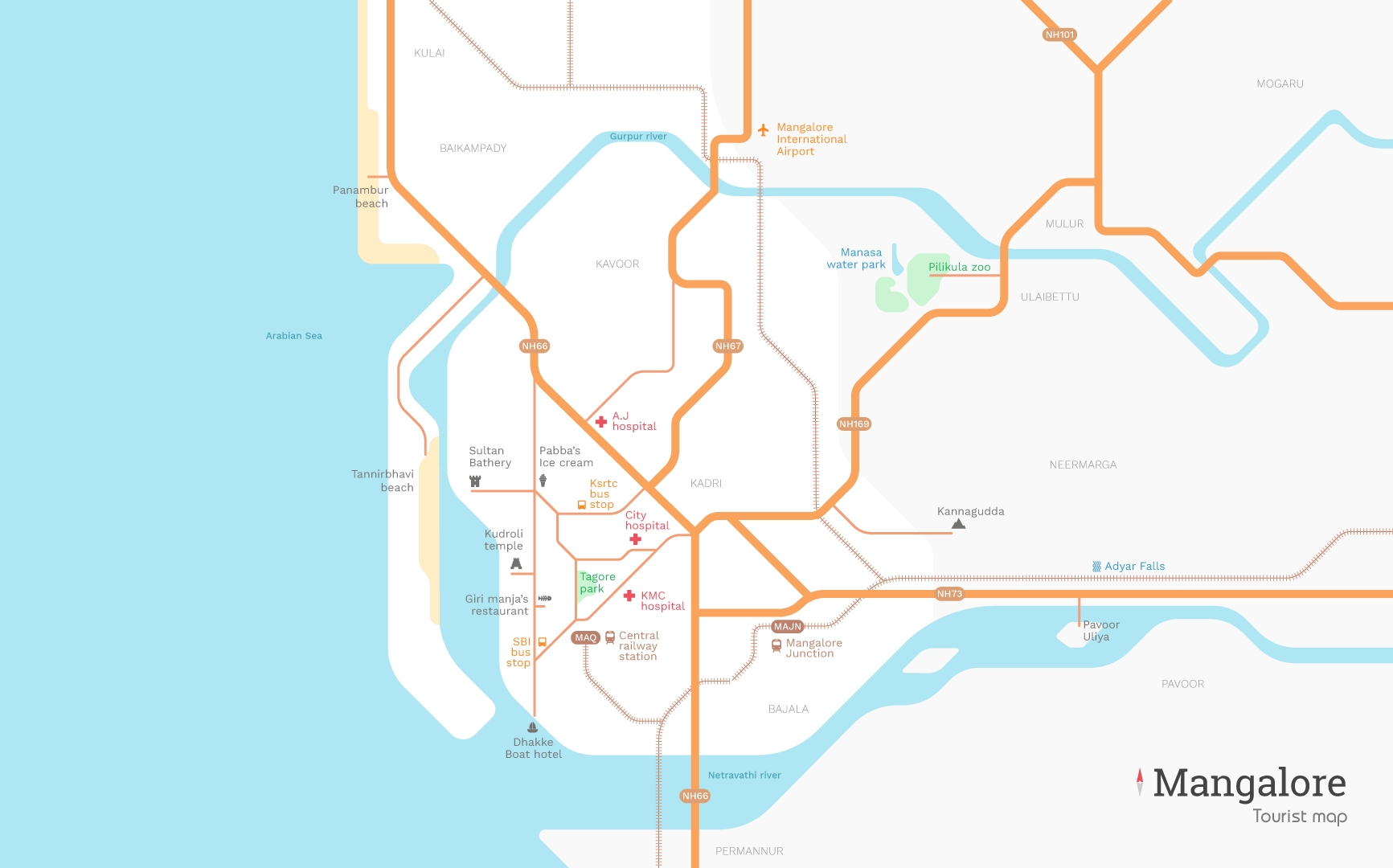
A schematic map showing the tourist attractions in Mangaluru city.

The city of Mangaluru is proclaimed as the gateway to Karnataka and lies nestled between the blue waters of the Arabian Sea and the green, towering hills of the Western Ghats. The 184 square km city is spread out over the backwaters of the two rivers, Netravati and Gurpura.

== Beaches ==
The city has the benefit of numerous golden-sand beaches:

- Panambur Beach: It is credited as one of the cleanest and most neatly maintained beaches in India and attracts a large number of tourists.
- Thannirbhavi beach: This is the second most crowded beach after Panambur Beach. Tannirbhavi beach has some basic facilities like life guards, proper toilets, a parking lot, a couple of small eateries and some concrete benches. One can take a Ferry ride across Gurupur river from Sultan Battery.
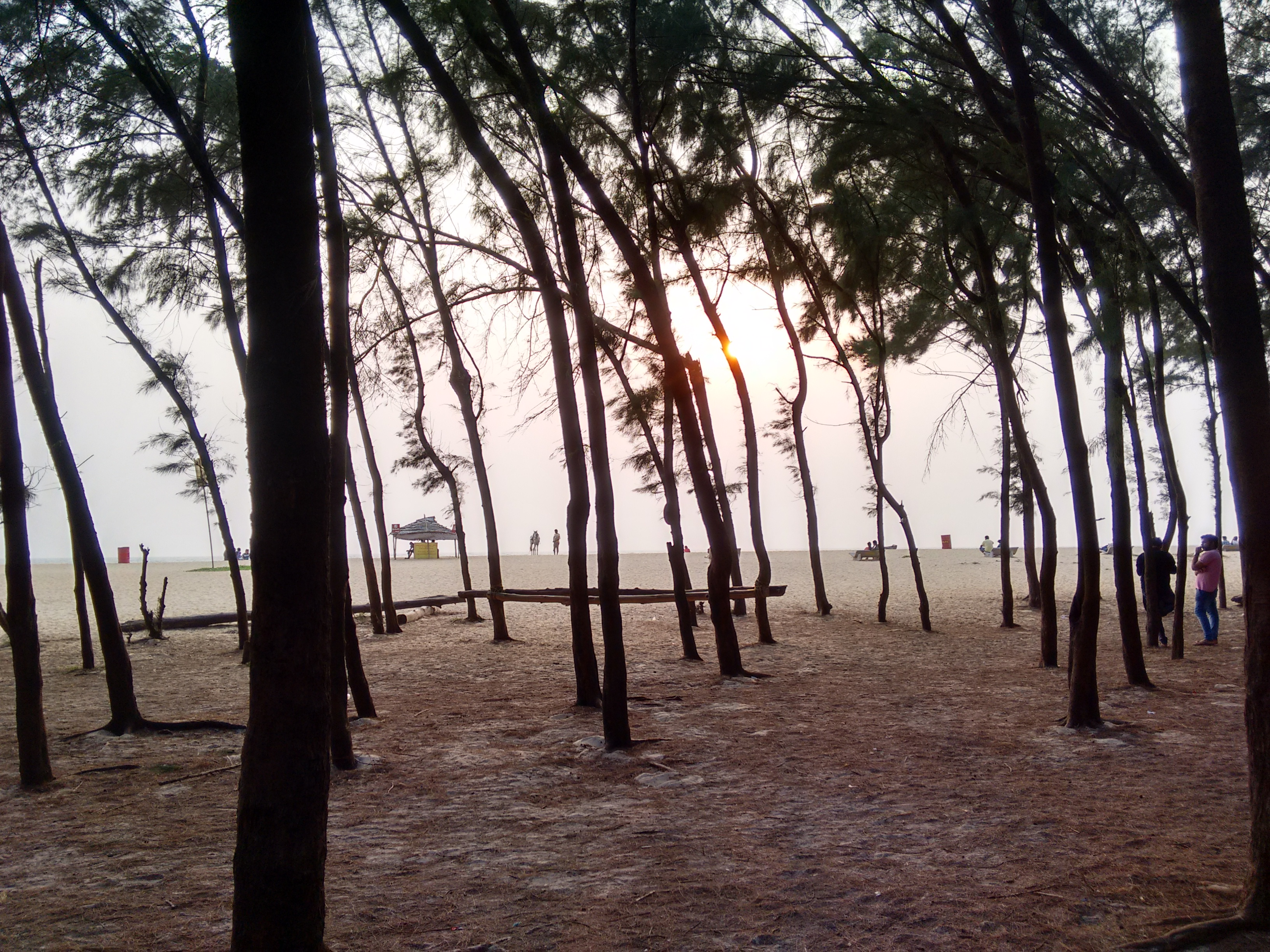
- Tannirbhavi Beach
  NITK beach: This beach is situated in Surathkal. A lighthouse is located close to the beach.
- Someshwara beach: The beach, located in Ullal, has large rocks called Rudra Shile or Rudra Paadhe. Rudra is Lord Shiva and Shile or Paadhe means rock in Tulu language.
- Mukka beach: Situated 20 km from Mangalore, one can find a variety of shells on this beach. Mukka beach is covered with the golden sands and tall pine trees with an old light house situated on this beach.
- Sasihithlu Beach: This beach has hosted the Indian Open of Surfing tournament in 2016 and 2017.

== Places of worship ==
Temples and religious buildings in Mangaluru include:

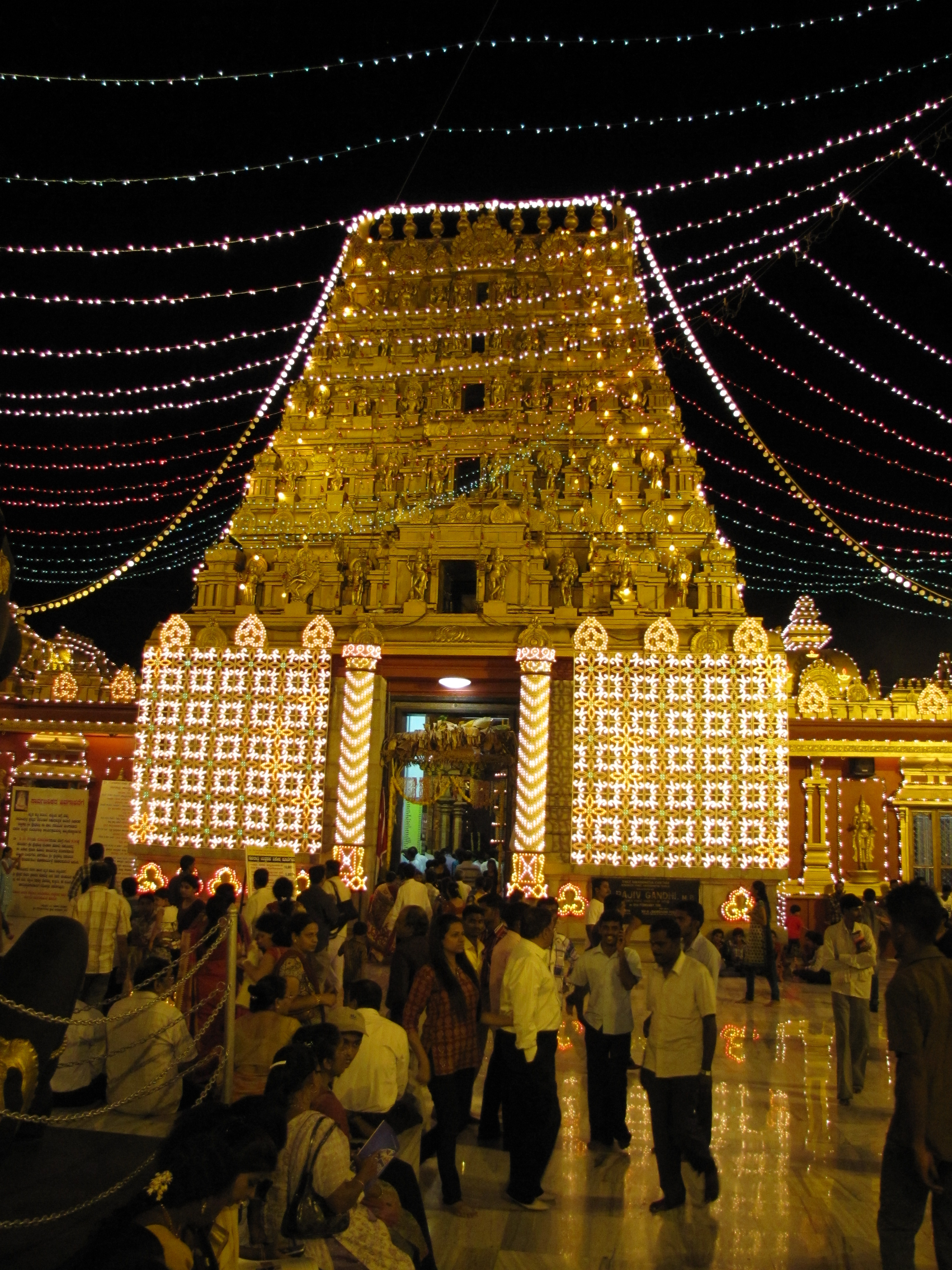
Gokarnanatheshwara Temple

Mangaladevi temple: The temple is dedicated to Hindu god Shakti in the form of Mangaladevi. The city is named after the presiding deity, Mangaladevi. As per another legend, the temple is believed to have been built by Parashurama, one of the ten avatars of Hindu god Vishnu and later expanded by Kundavarman.

- Kadri Manjunatha temple:It is located at Kadri, It is said to be built during the 10th or 11th century and Buddhism was practised here till the 10th century AD. The idol of Lord Manjunathaswamy of the temple is called as oldest of the South Indian Temples. There is a natural spring at an elevated location at the back of the temple. It is called Gomukha. The water from this spring is let into 9 ponds of different sizes adjacent to it.
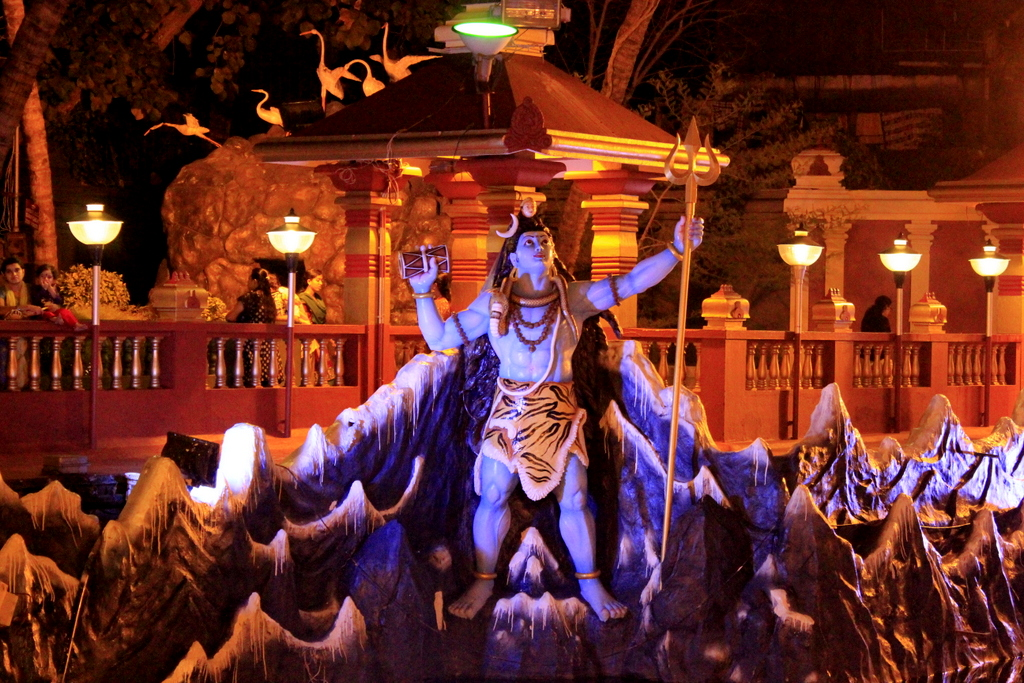
- Shiva Statue, Gokarnanatheshwara Temple
  St Aloysius Chapel: The chapel built by Jesuit Missionaries in 1880 and its interiors painted by the Italian Jesuit Antonio Moscheni in 1899, is an architectural marvel that could stand comparison with the chapels of Rome. The interior of the chapel decorated with paintings by Antonio Moscheni (1854 –1905) that cover almost all of the walls, which is unusual in chapels in India. The paintings are preserved by a recognized board of the nation which maintains and restores all historic artefacts.
- Rosario Cathedral: Roman Catholic Diocese of Mangalore, dedicated to Our Lady of the Rosary built by the Portuguese in 1568. Desecrated and destroyed by samba in 1784, the church was reconstructed in 1813.

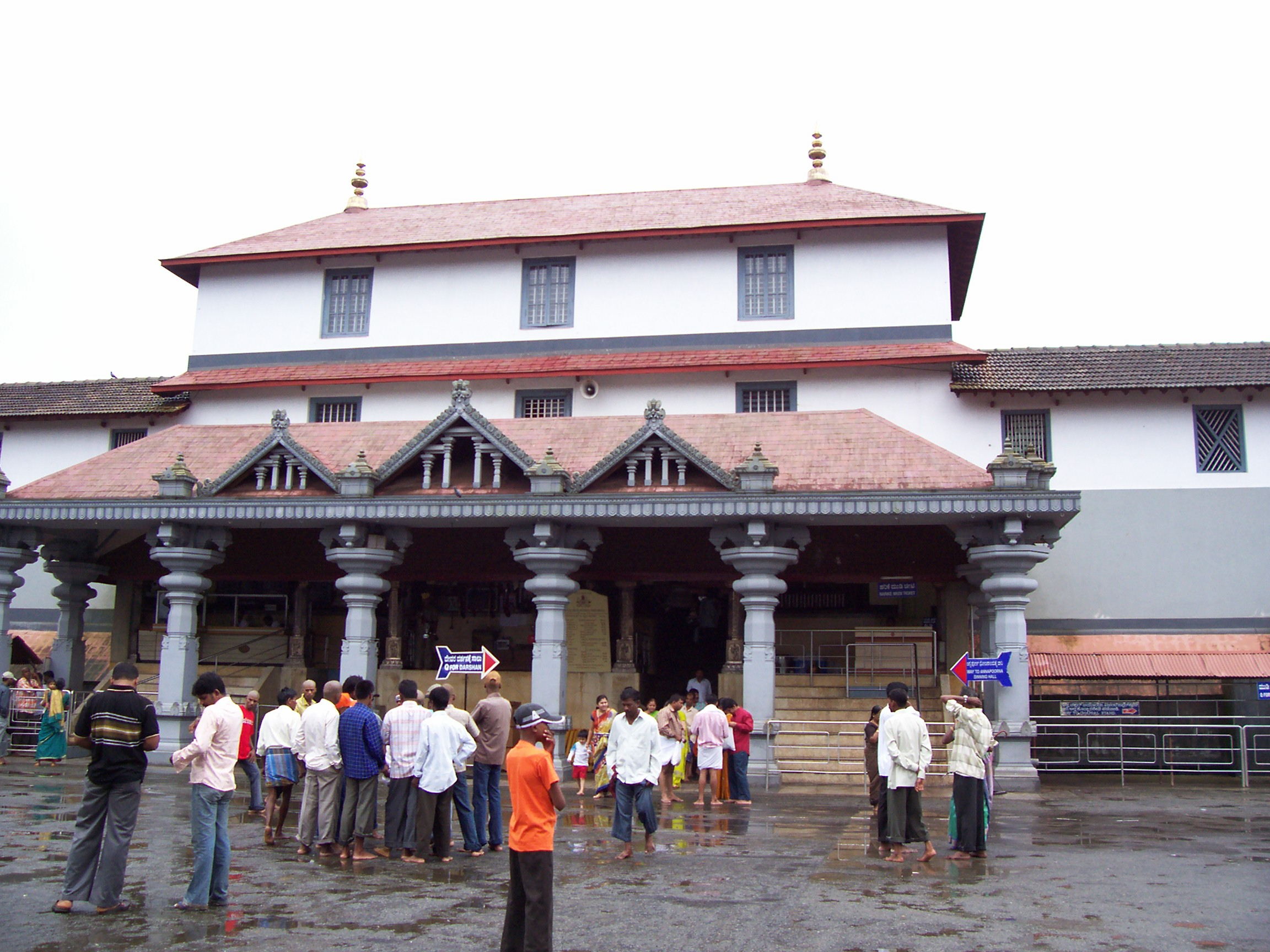
Dharmasthala Temple

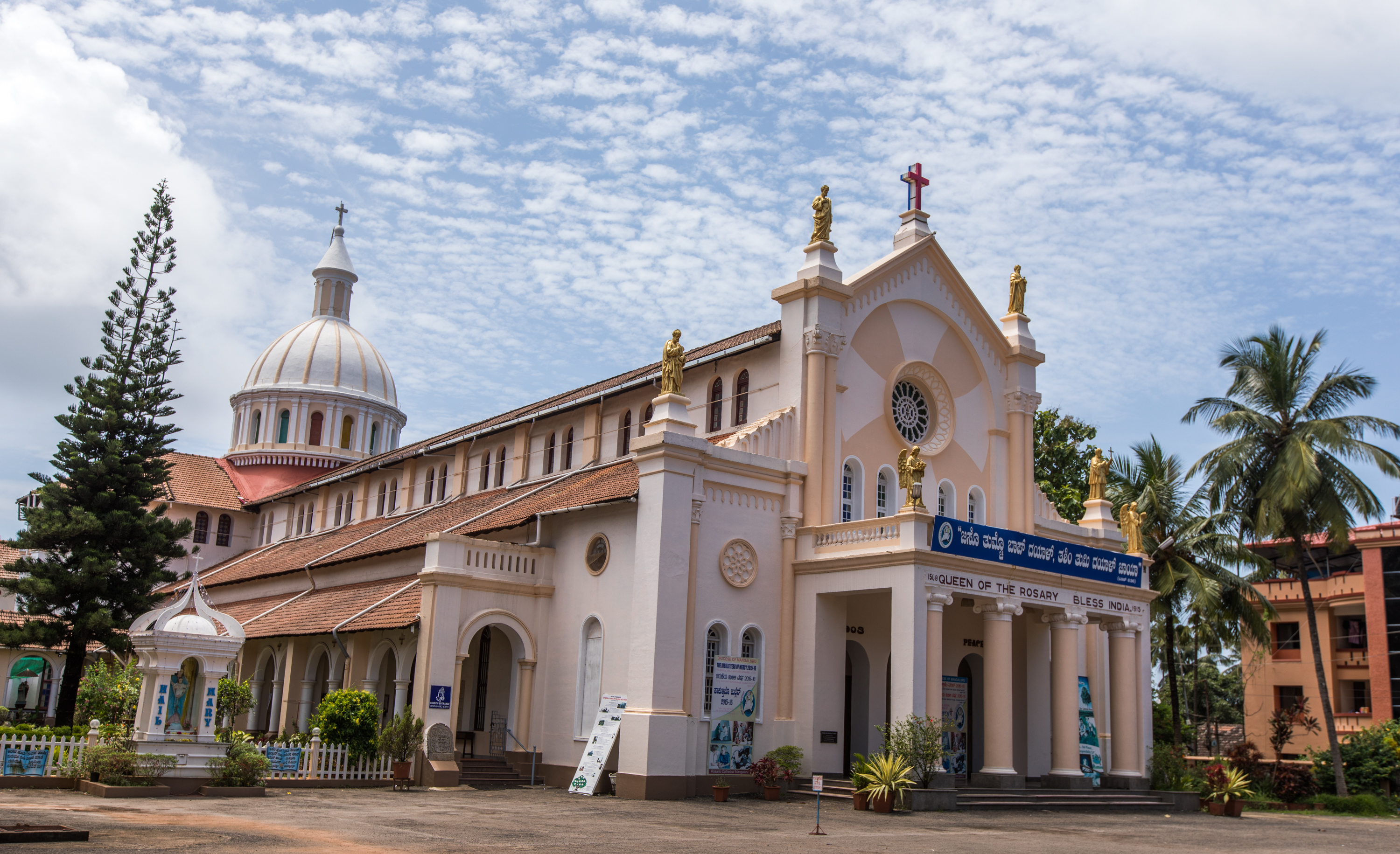
- Rosario Cathedral
  Church of Our Lady of Miracles: Also known as Milagres church is a historic Roman Catholic Church situated in the Hampankatta locality of Mangalore. The church was built in 1680 by Bishop Thomas de Castro, a Theatine from Divar, Goa. After Tipu was killed by the British during the Fourth Anglo-Mysore War on 4 May 1799, the Mangalorean Catholics were freed from Captivity and most subsequently returned to Mangalore. Among the returnees was a baker Lawrence Bello, who built a chapel to replace the demolished church.
- Dharmasthala Sri Manjunatha Temple: This is an 800-year-old religious institution in the temple town of Dharmasthala 75 km away from Mangalore. The deities of the temple are Shiva, who is referred to as Mañjunatha, Ammavaru, the tirthankara Chandraprabha and the protective gods of Jainism, Kalarahu, Kalarkayi, Kumarasvami and Kanyakumari.

== Parks ==
- Kadri park: It is located in Kadri gudde (meaning hill in Tulu). It is the largest park within the city limits of Mangaluru.
- Tagore park: It is located at Light House Hill Road in Mangaluru.
- Tannirbavi Tree park: It is located near Thannirbhavi beach in Mangaluru.

== Museums ==
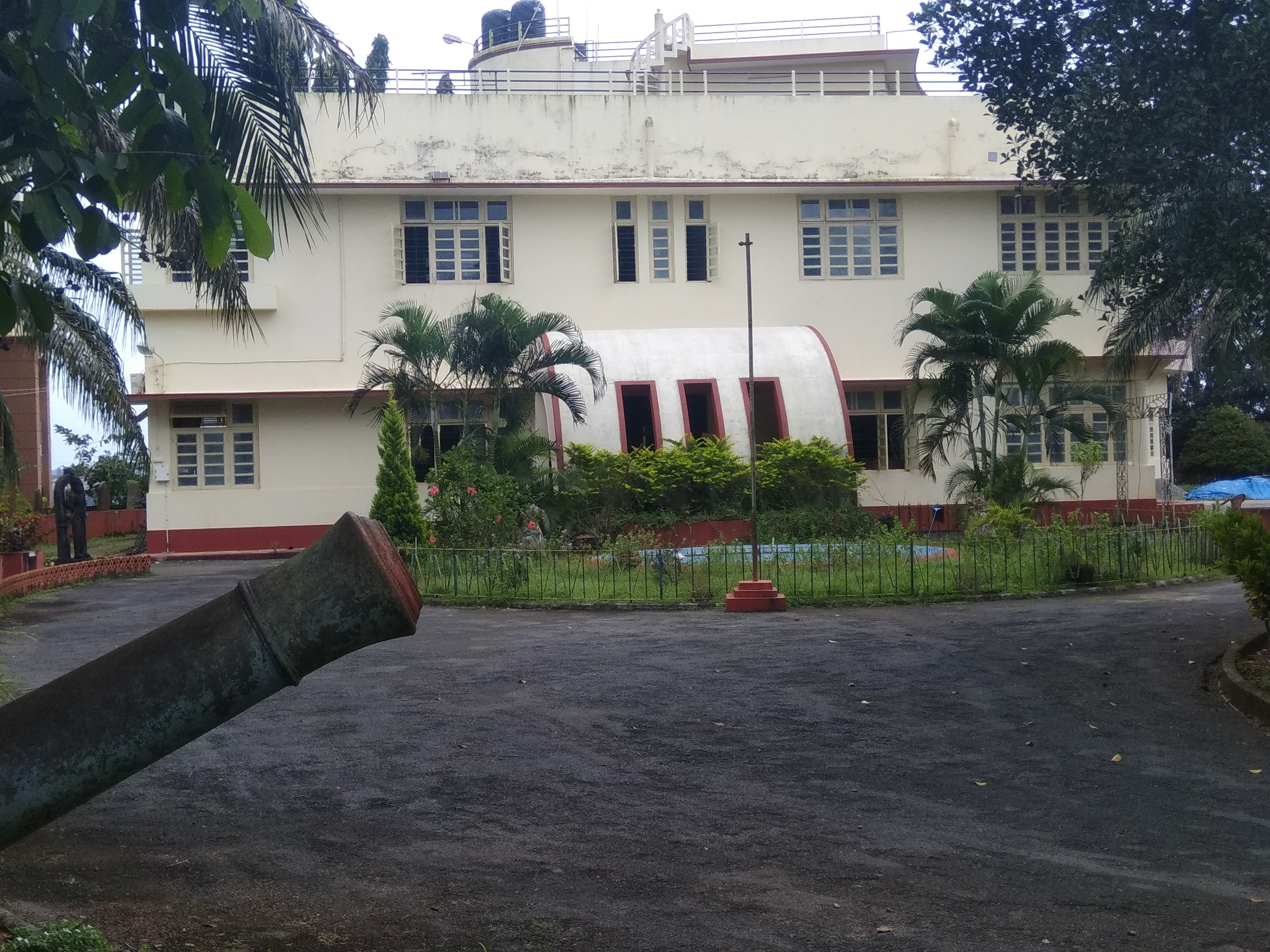
Srimanthi Bhai Government Museum Bejai Mangaluru

- Srimanthi Bai Memorial Government Museum: Established in 1960, this museum is located just a kilometer east of the KSRTC bus stand, also known as Bejai Museum which houses a variety of antiquities including wooden carvings of divinities such as Bhairava and Hanuman, stone sculptures dating back to 13th century, porcelain and an outstanding bronze bell with a miniature Lakshmi shrine. It also exhibits materials of art, archaeology, ethnology, palm leaf photographs, paper paintings, manuscripts, sculptures, oil paintings, metal objects and paper manuscripts.
- Aloyseum: The museum houses several items with historic significance including the first car of Mangaluru and Mangaluru's first electric generator dating back to 1930, the Old Missal with the size of a broadsheet newspaper, animal and fish bones, skulls, horns and skins, mineral specimen, old radios, telegraphic equipment, antique telephone sets, manuscripts on palm leaves, Portuguese statues, an old pulpit from Cordel Church, copies of paintings by old European masters, swords, daggers and other weapons, postal stamps, coins and medals, priestly vestments dating back to 1878.
- Manjusha Car Museum: Located to the south of the Dharmasthala Temple, it houses a vast collection of objects, antiques, paintings, artifacts, temple chariots collected from temples across Karnataka, and also vintage and classic cars. Terracotta coins from the Mauryan period are still preserved in the museum, which dates around 1st century BC.

== Historical places ==
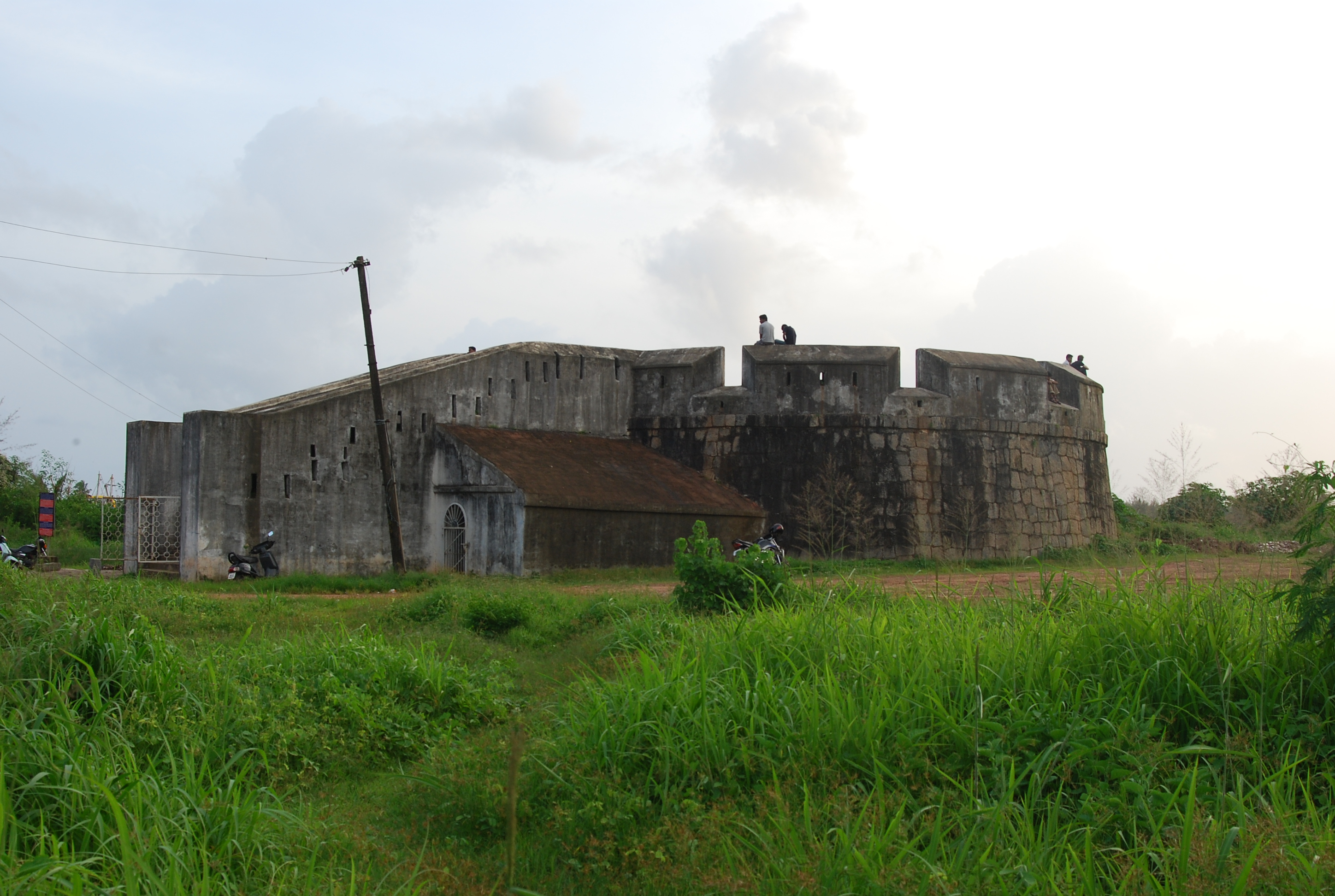
- Sultan Battery watch tower built by Tipu
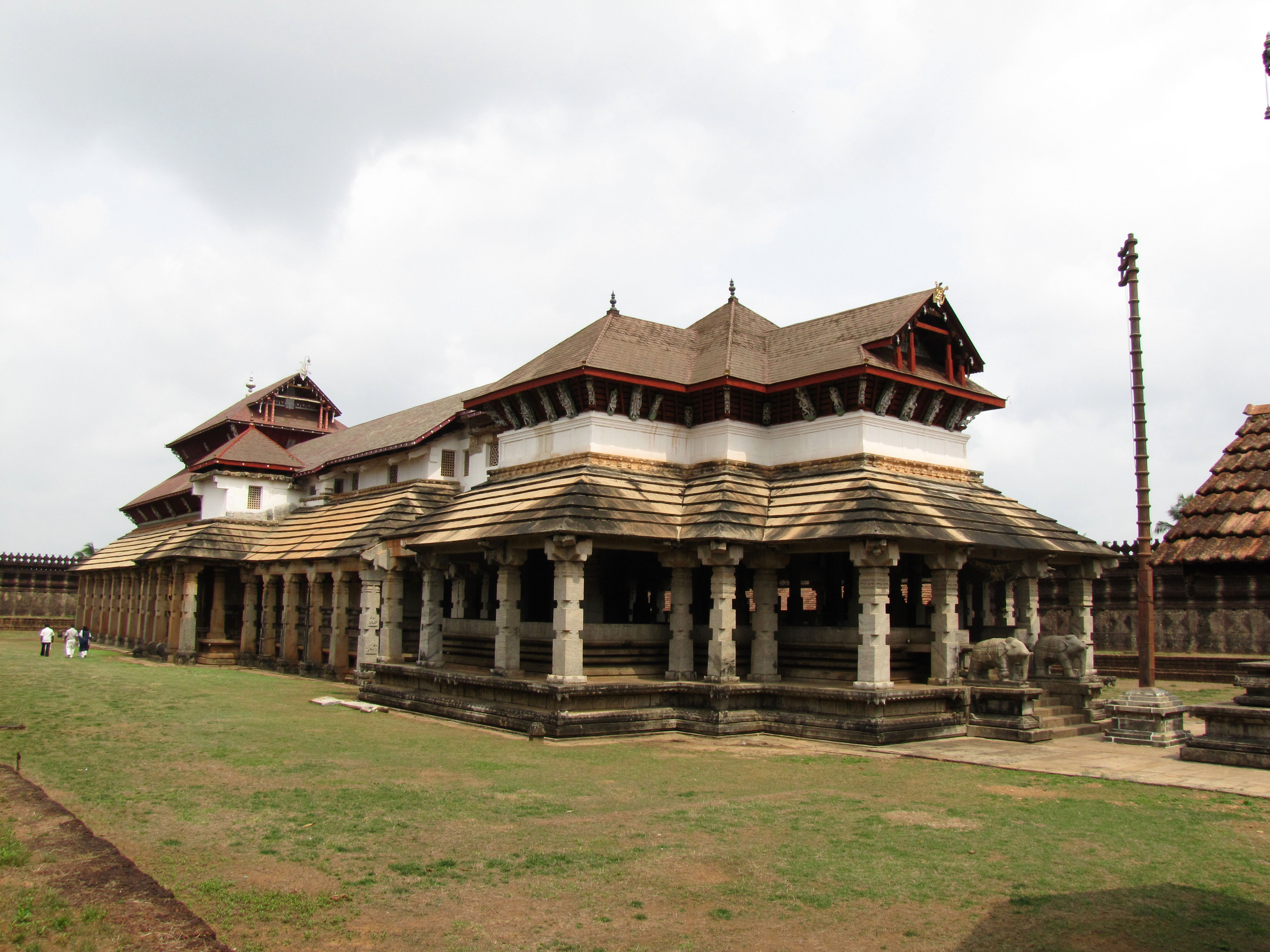
- Savira Kambada Basadi (1000 Pillar Temple), Moodbidri
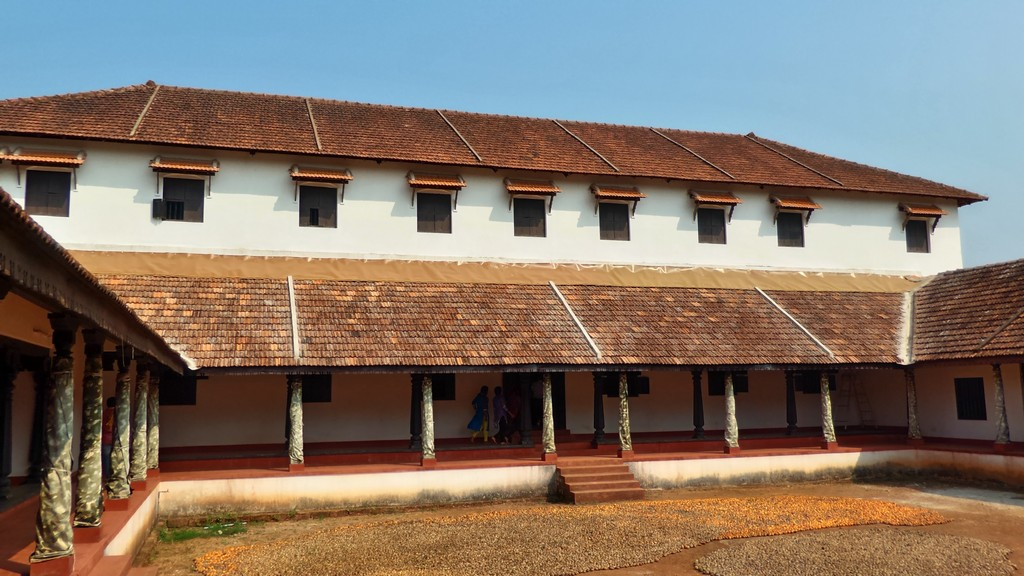
  Pilikula Heritage Village
  Sultan Battery: The Sultan Battery watch tower, constructed in 1784 by Tipu Sultan is situated in Boloor,4 km from the centre of Mangaluru city. If one climbs to the top of the watch tower by stairs, he can get a panoramic view of Arabian Sea which leaves nature lovers in boundless joy. One can take the ferry ride by paying small amount across the Gurupur river and reach Tannirbhavi Beach.
- Saavira Kambada Basadi: Built by the Vijayanagar ruler Devaraya Wodeyar in 1430, this historical temple is situated 34 km northeast of Mangalore in the town of Moodabidri. Moodabidri is noted for its eighteen Jain temples but Saavira Kambada Temple is considered the finest among them.

== Amusement parks ==
- Manasa Amusement & Water Park: Manasa Amusement & Water Park is located within a 370 Acres tourism project of District administration “Pilikula Nisargadhama”, an eco-educational tourist park at Vamanjoor, just 12 km from Mangalore City. It is a 15 minutes drive from city centre.
- Pilikula Theme Park: Pilikula has a theme park which attempts to showcase the rich native heritage and coastal culture of the people of Dakshina Kannada district and is one of the one-stop educational and recreational destinations in India.

== Nature ==
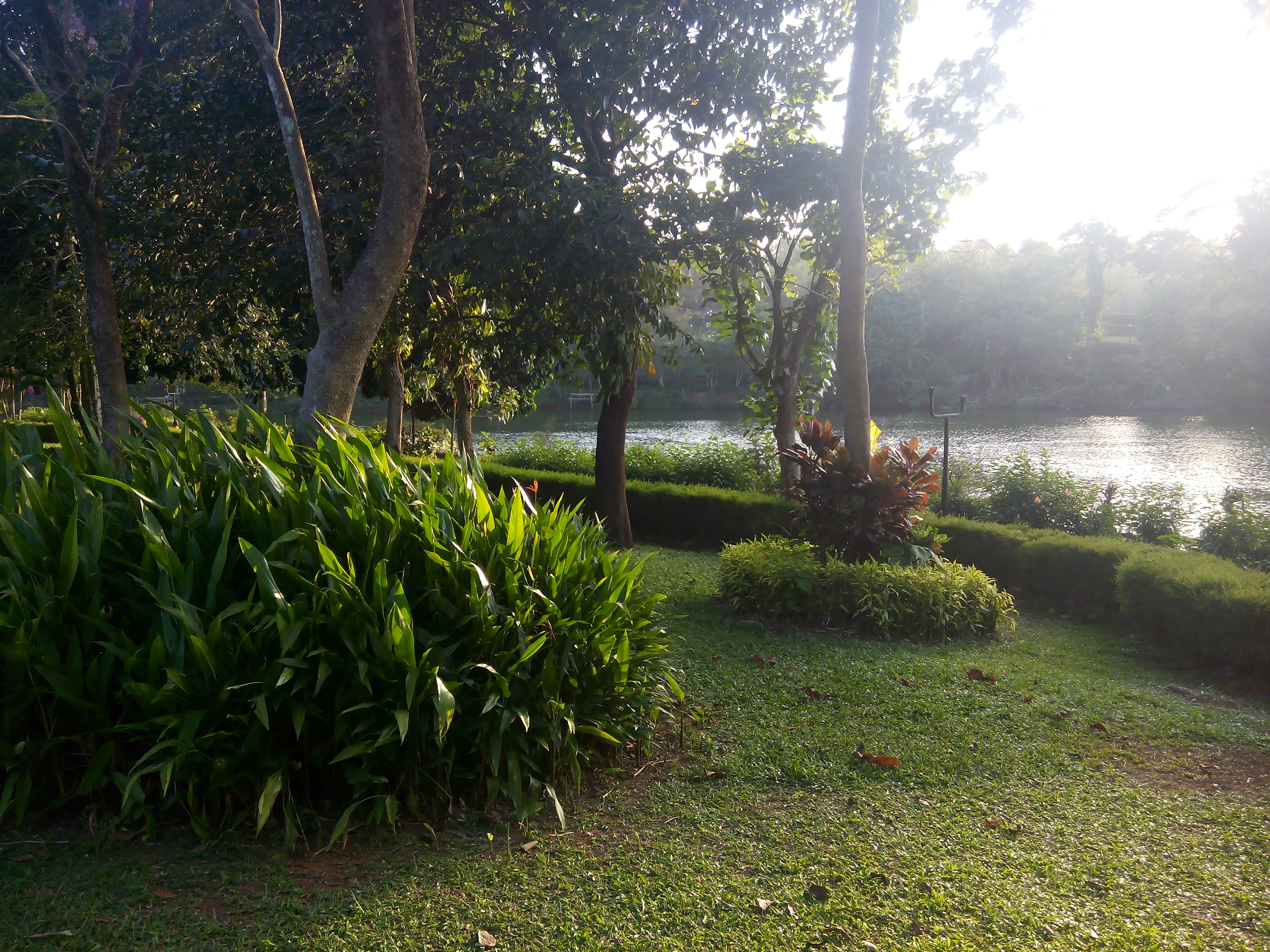
Pilikula Botanical Garden in Mangaluru

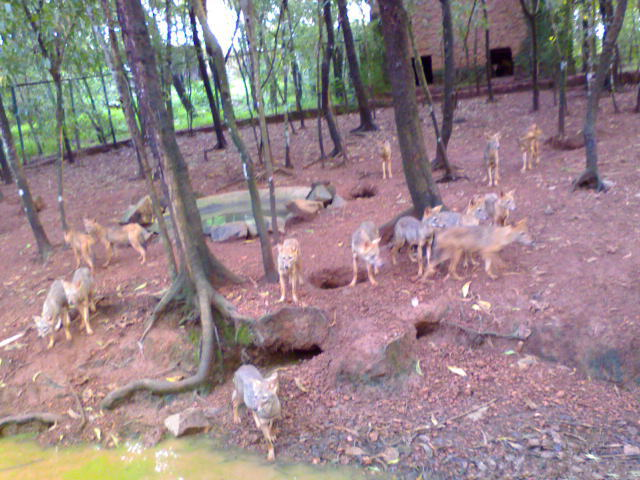
Pilikula Zoo

- Adyar falls: Adyar waterfalls at the outskirts at about 12 km drive from the city. There are two waterfalls here at a distance of about 200 meters on two extreme ends of the hillock. These waterfalls can be enjoyed only up to October–November.
- Karinja Cliff: Karinja Cliff is a popular tourist spot in Bantwal 40 km away from Mangaluru with people visiting this cliff to enjoy the fresh air, lush green.
- Pavoor Uliya: It is an Island, located just 12 km away from Mangalore ^{[2]}. The island has 35 houses with a chapel ^{[3]}. Netravathi River has been surrounded by four sides. During Summer a temporary wooden bridge connects to the outer world.

== Garden ==
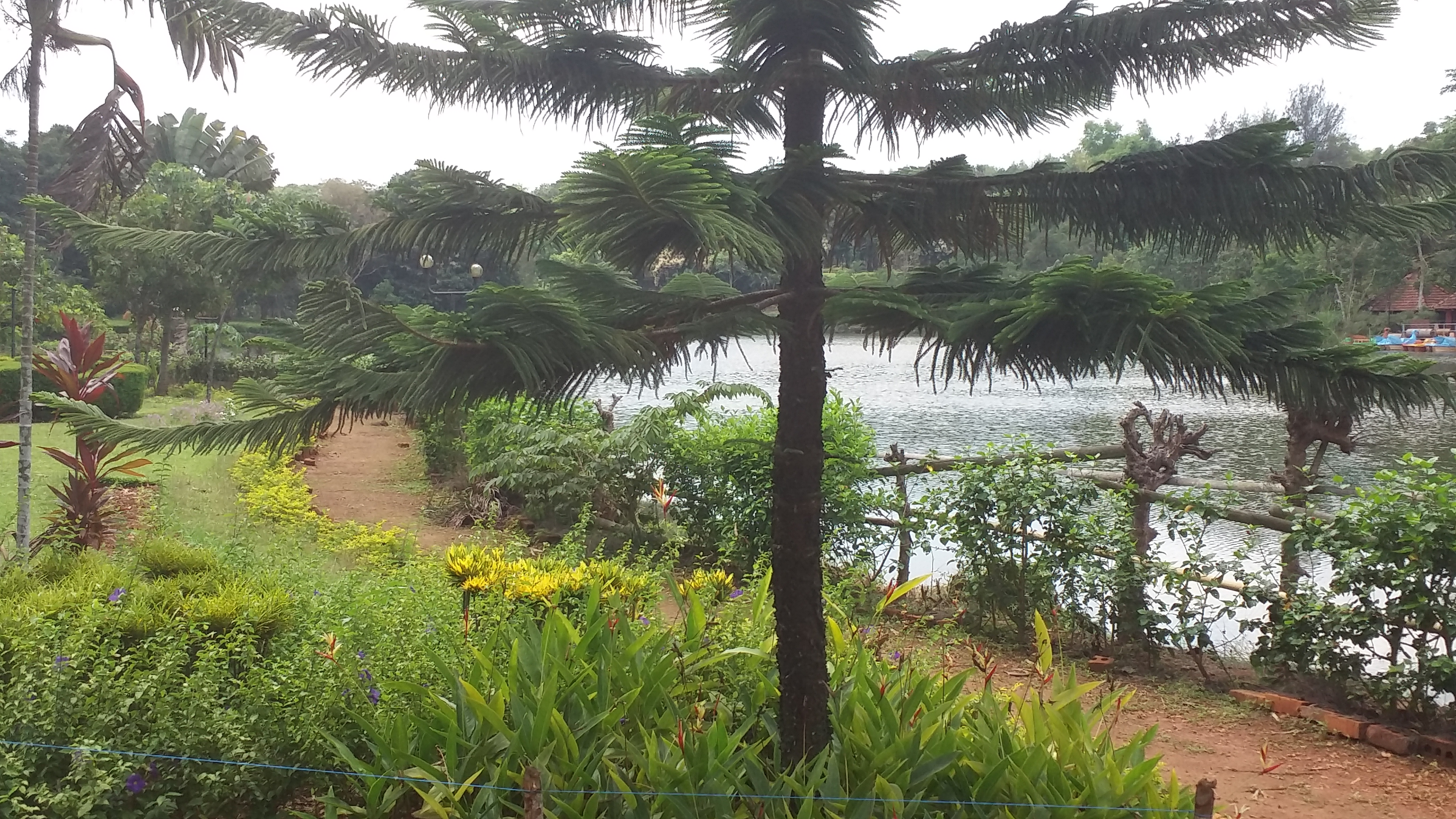
New Caledonia pine tree beside the lake at the Pilikula Botanical Garden (Arboretum)

- Pilikula Arboretum: An arboretum (a garden comprising woody species of plants, i.e. trees and shrubs) extending over an area of 35 hectares has been established at Pilikula Nisargadhama where about 60,000 seedlings belonging to 236 taxa of flowering plants of Western Ghats, spread over 60 families have been planted randomly as well as family clusters. They include 70 taxa endemic to the Western Ghats region. The arboretum has a focus on the conservation of the plants of the Western Ghats. It not only contains a number of threatened species, but also a few Re-discovered species that were considered to be extinct earlier. The arboretum also includes 6 acres devoted to medicinal plants with more than 460 varieties, often visited by students of botany and Ayurvedic medicine.

== Wildlife ==
- Pilikula Zoo: The speciality of this zoo is that the wild animals are not kept in cages. They are in the open. However, there are partitions like wide trenches or wire mesh, in order to avoid direct contact with visitors. There are tigers, leopards, bears and other wild animals inside the park.

== Planetarium ==
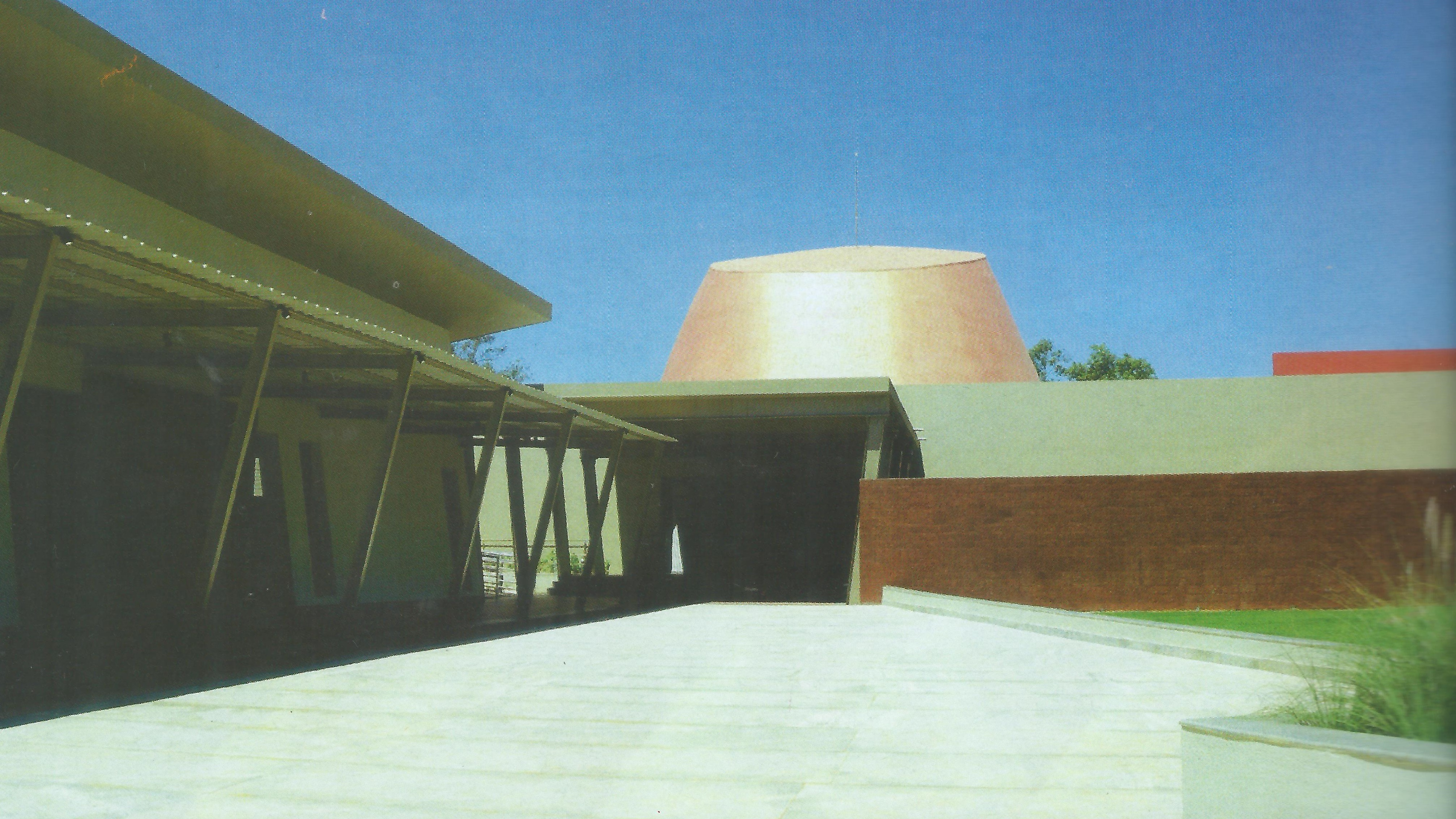
Dome of the Swami Vivekananda 3D Planetarium in Mangaluru

- Swami Vivekananda Planetarium: Situated at Pilikula, it is the 1st 3D Planetarium in India.

== Shopping ==
- Hampankatta: This place is the heart of the city, as most of the public utilities are located here the locality boasts the most buzzing commercial activity in the city.
- City Centre Mall: City Centre encompasses over 850,000 sq ft of retail space. The mall boasts a wide diversity of outlets spreading across five floors with over 149 retail stores and services.
- Forum Fiza Mall: It is the largest mall in Mangaluru, located on Pandeshwar road in Mangaluru, 1 km away from the Mangalore Central railway station. Many of the Indian and international brands are available and have outlets in this mall.

== Library ==
- City Central Library: This is located close to St Aloysius college. This library is run by the Mangaluru City Corporation. There are several branches of city central library within the city.

== Eateries ==
- Ideal Ice Cream
- Pabbas

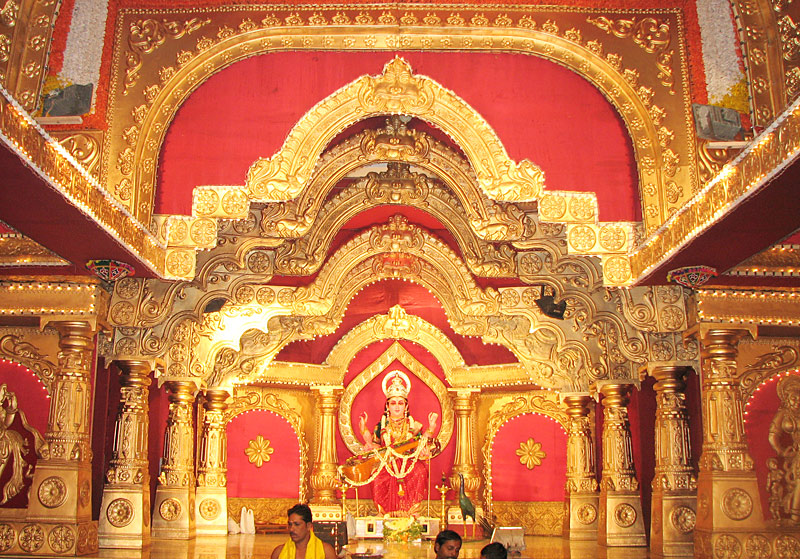
The idol of Sharada installed during Mangaluru Dasara.

== Festivals ==
- Mangaluru Dasara: It is a ten-day festival at Kudroli Temple attracts thousands of devotees from various states of India who visit Mangaluru to witness Dasara and the century-old Sri Gokarnatheswara temple which shimmers with a golden glow. The Mangaladevi temple from which the city inherited its name. It is yet another temple which attracts devotees from all over India during Navaratri. "Mangalore Sharadotsava" or "Sharada Mahotsava" is the 9 days celebration during the Navaratri in Sri Venkatramana Temple, Dongarekeri.

== Around Mangalore ==
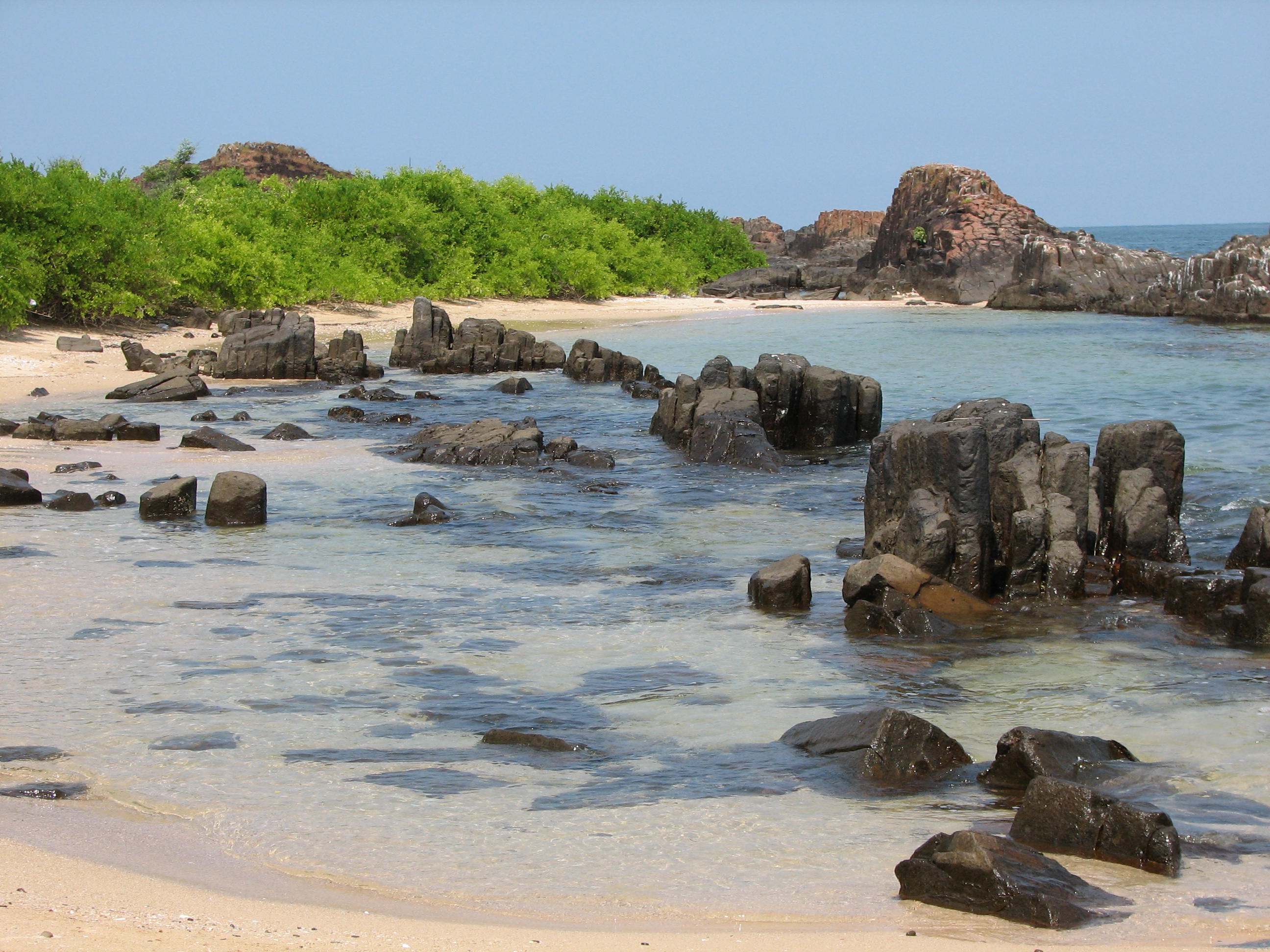
A view of basaltic rock formation in St. Mary's Island

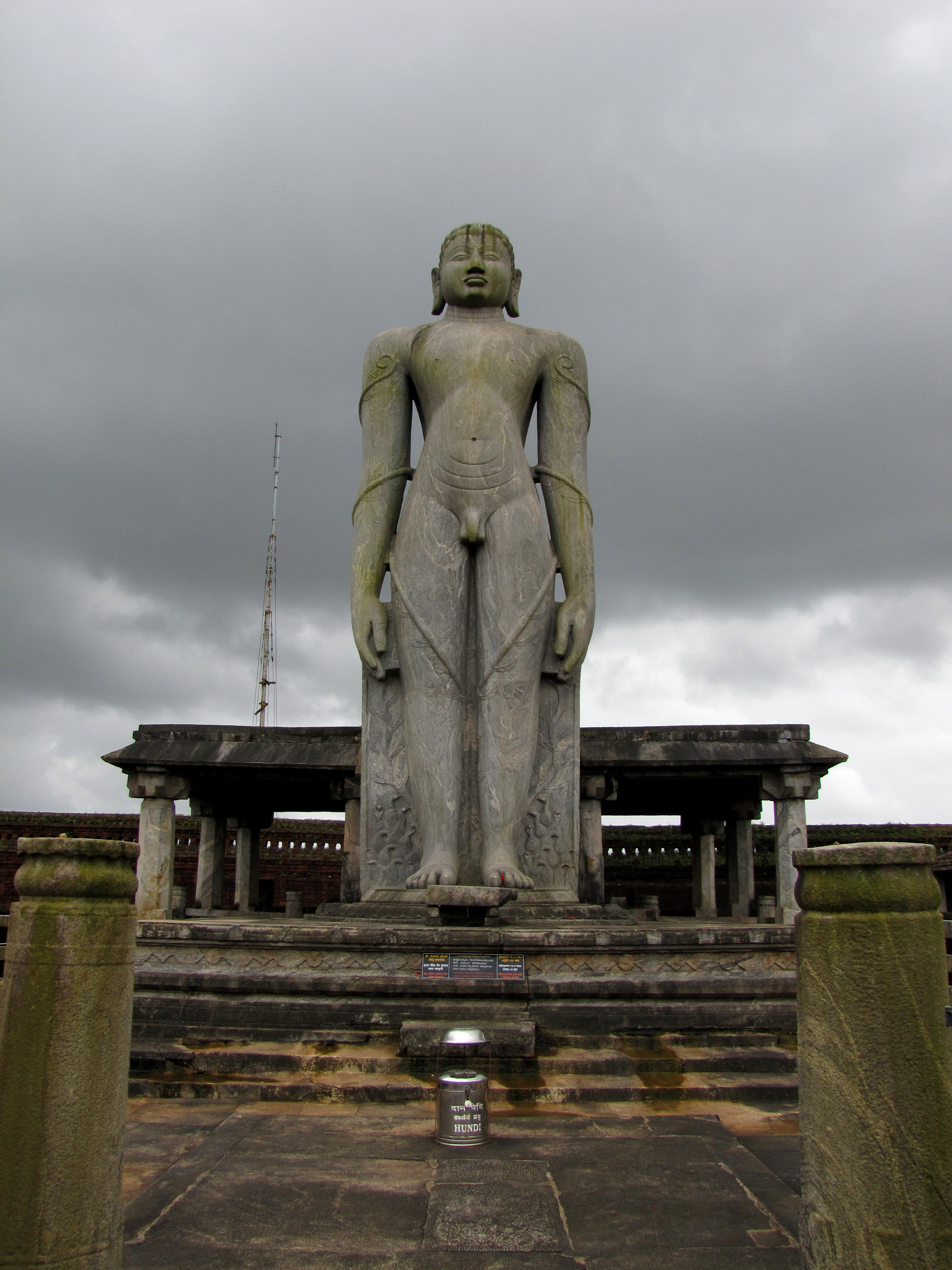
Gomateshwara Statue, Karkala

There are also tourist attractions in towns farther from the city including Karkala, Kundapur, Kasaragod and the temple town Udupi. The neighbouring town of Udupi, is an important Teerthasthal (pilgrimage place) with its historical Krishna Temple is the cultural center of Karnataka. Mangalore shares its border with Kerala in the south. A distance of 50 km away from Mangalore is a town in Kerala, Kasaragod which still shares cultural links with Mangalore and is often named as land of Lords and Forts.

- Bahubali Gomateshwara monolith is the 12.8 metre or 42 feet tall monolith of Bahubali, the Gommateshwara. Built in 1432 CE, this 583-year-old monolith in Karkala is the second largest monolith of Gommateshwara. This is about 51 km away from Mangalore.
- Udupi Sri Krishna Matha is a famous Hindu temple dedicated to god Krishna.
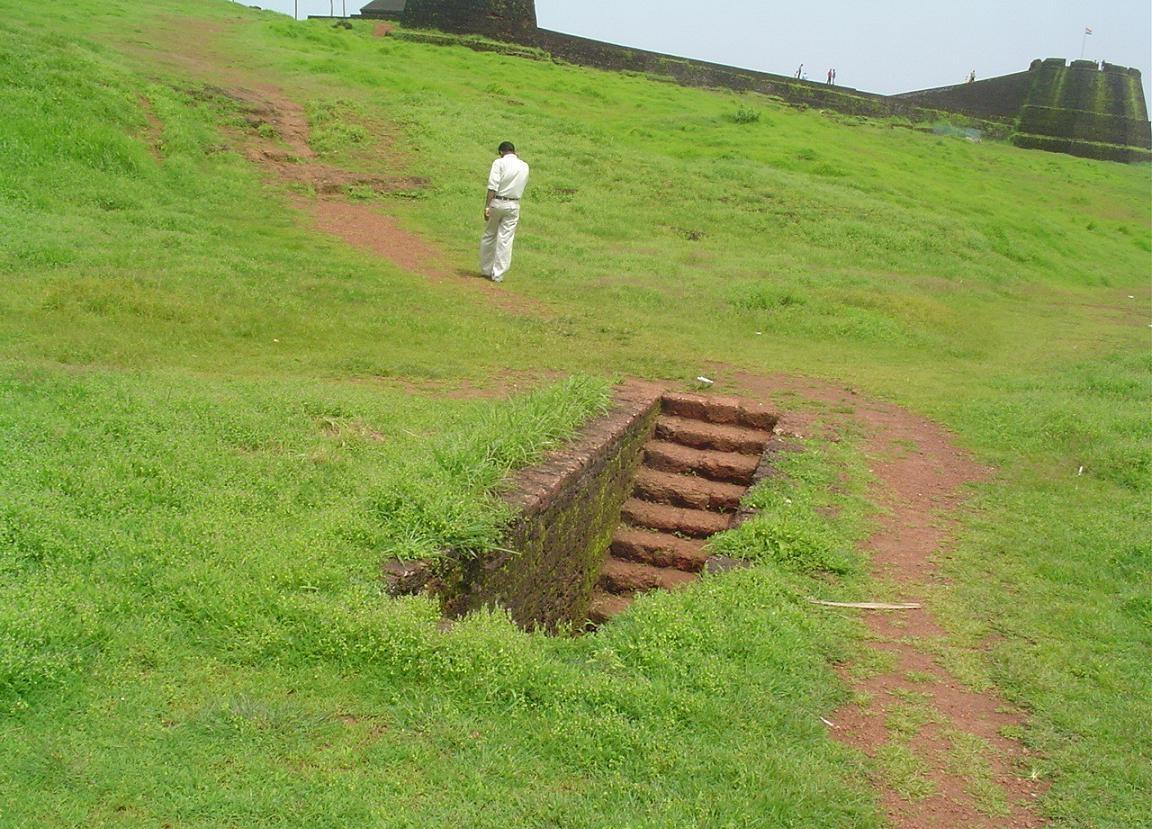
- Staircase inside the Bekal fort
  St. Marys island, are a set of four small islands in the Arabian Sea off the coast of Malpe in Udupi, Karnataka, India. They are known for their distinctive geological formation of columnar basaltic lava.
- Mookambika Temple, Kollur
- St. Lawrence church, Karkala.
- Malpe beach
- Maravanthe beach
- Bekal Fort is the largest fort in Kerala, situated at Bekal village in Kasaragod district, North Kerala and it is 67 km from Mangalore spreading over 40 acres (160,000 m^{2}).
- Chandragiri Fort built in the 17th century, is in Kasaragod District of Kerala, south India. This large squarish fort is 150 feet (46 m) above sea level and occupies an area of about seven acres.
