= History of Mangalorean Catholics =

The History of Mangalorean Catholics begins with the legacy of Lusitanian culture or the Christianisation in Portuguese in Goa and Bombay, followed by the migration of the New Christians of Portuguese Goa, to the Canara subregion then under the Kingdom of Bednore from the mid-16th to mid-18th centuries and the subsequent formation of a unique Mangalorean Catholic community and identity. Four centuries of living in South Canara gave these Catholic Christians an identity of their own, distinct from Goans and Bombay East Indians (Bombayers).

Catholic Christians of Goa migrated to Mangalore and the neighbouring areas of Mangalore in three major waves; the first after 1560, the second after 1570, and the third in about 1683. The first wave of migrants left due to the Goan Inquisition that made the use of Konknni, a punishable offence for converts to Western Christianity. The second wave left Goa because of famines, epidemics and political upheavals. The third and last wave resulted from the violent Mahratta Invasion of Goa and Bombay. Until the time of Hyder Ali's regime, the community had flourished. Soon after his son Tippu Sultan gained possession of Mangalore in January 1784, he issued orders to seize the Christians in Canara, confiscate their estates, and deport them to Seringapatam. They had to suffer extreme hardships, torture, death by execution and other kinds of persecution during the captivity, in which many were forcibly converted to Sunni Islam. Of the 60,000–80,000 Christians taken captive, only 15,000–20,000 made it out alive as Christians. The captivity ended with the defeat and death of Tippu at the Battle of Seringapatam (1799).

== Ancestral roots ==
Traditional accounts of the ancestral roots of Mangalorean Catholics have taught that they are descended from the Indo-Aryans who lived on the banks of the now extinct Saraswati River. Most historians agree that the Aryans descended into India from what is present-day Iran, and some came by themselves, while others came with their leaders in search of territorial expansions. The Saraswati river dried up in long stretches around 1500 BCE, when its source in the Himalayas got diverted into the Yamuna River due to sand deposition and river piracy. Due to the harshness in their native environments, several Indo-Aryan groups migrated to various different locations across India. According to Historian Alan Machado Prabhu, the modern Mangalorean Catholic community is mainly descended from two Indo-Aryan groups: the group which migrated to the Konkan region; and the group which migrated to Bengal.

== Pre-migration era ==
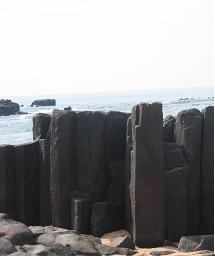
St Mary's Islands in South Canara, where the Portuguese explorer Vasco Da Gama landed in 1498

All records of an early existence of Christians in South Canara were lost at the time of their deportation by Tippu Sultan in 1784. Hence, it is not known when exactly Christianity was introduced in South Canara, although it is possible that Syrian Christians settled in South Canara just as they did in Kerala, a state south of Canara. The Italian traveler Marco Polo recorded that there were considerable trading activities between the Red Sea and the Canara coast in the 13th century. It can be surmised that foreign Christian merchants were visiting the coastal towns of South Canara during that period for commerce and possibly some Christian priests might have accompanied them for evangelistic work. In April 1321, the French Dominican friar Jordanus Catalani of Severac (in south-western France) with four other friars landed at Thana. He then travelled to Bhatkal in North Canara, a port town on the coastal route from Thana to Quilon in 1328. About 1493, a cross was caught in the net by some fishermen off Mangalore. It was made of Olive wood, well finished and one span and a half in length, indicating the possibility of a Christian community in Mangalore. Some crosses painted black and red were discovered by the Portuguese in 1505 while digging up for laying the foundation for a fortress at Anjediva in North Canara. According to Paulo da Trinidade, they appeared to have belonged to a chapel or church of Christians. It is difficult to say whether these findings were Christian crosses or some other objects which looked like crosses and actually were instruments used by Hindus for astronomical observations. According to Historian Severine Silva, no concrete evidence has yet been found that there were any permanent settlements of Christians in South Canara before the 16th century. Even if it is assumed that Christianity existed in South Canara before the arrival of the Portuguese, the Christian community must have disappeared by 1498.

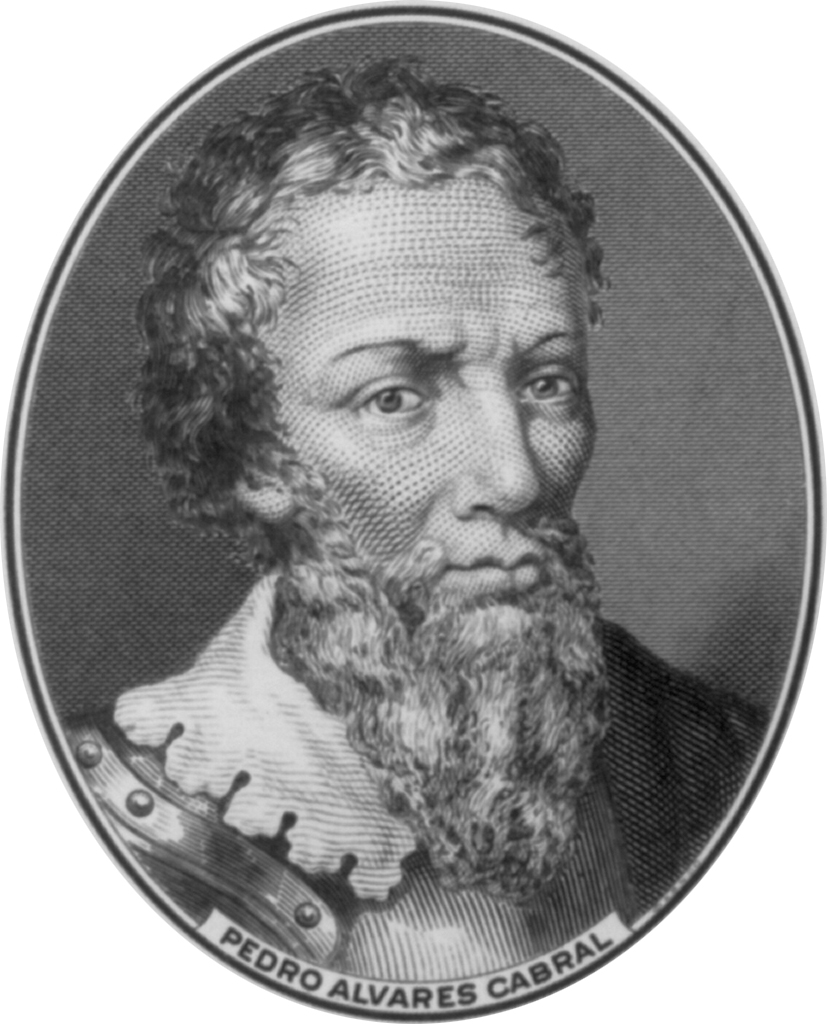
Pedro Álvares Cabral converted 22 or 23 natives to Christianity in the Mangalore region in 1500.

It was only after the advent of the Portuguese in the region that Christianity began to be propagated. In 1498, the Portuguese explorer Vasco Da Gama landed on a group of islands in South Canara on his voyage from Portugal to India. He named them El Padron de Santa Maria, which later came to be known as St Mary's Islands. In 1500, Pedro Álvares Cabral, a Portuguese explorer, arrived at Anjediva with eight Franciscan missionaries. These missionaries under the leadership of Henrique Soares de Coimbra converted 22 or 23 natives to Christianity in the Mangalore region. On 19 November 1502, some Christians of Mangalore and other interior places went with presents to meet Vasco da Gama, who was in Cochin. These Christian ambassadors told da Gama that they had their bishops and all of them said mass. They also told him that they undertook pilgrimages to the sepulcher of St. Thomas. During the early part of the 16th century, Canara was ruled by Krishnadevaraya (1509–1529), the ruler of the Vijayanagara Empire. As it was not possible for the Portuguese to enter Canara with Krishnadevaraya as ruler, a Portuguese alliance with Krishnadevaraya was the only way to enter Canara. Even before Alfonso de Albuquerque's conquest of Goa in 1510, the Portuguese had factories (trading posts) in Canara, as Krishnadevaraya had granted commercial privileges to the Portuguese on the Canara coast and there was complete freedom of worship, belief and propagation of religious tenets in the Vijaynagara Empire. It was easy for the Portuguese to send re-inforcements of missionaries to the existing trading posts in Canara to advance the work of evangelisation.

In 1526, under the viceroyship of Lopo Vaz de Sampaio, the Portuguese took possession of Mangalore. During the rule of Lopo Vaz de Sampaio, a regular mission was established in Mangalore by some Franciscans who came from Goa, where they had been established in 1517. The Portuguese Franciscans slowly started spreading Christianity in Mangalore. On 31 January 1533, the Diocese of Goa was created by a bull of Pope Clement VII, and confirmed in 1534 by Pope Paul III by his bull Aequum Reputamus dated 3 November 1534. The Franciscan friar, Father John of Albuquerque, became the first Bishop of Goa in 1537. In 1534, Canara was placed under the ecclesiastic jurisdiction of the Bishop of Goa, where the Portuguese had a strong presence. Missionaries soon arrived and gained converts. The number of local converts in South Canara started increasing. During the mid–16th century, the Portuguese faced resistance from Abbakka Rani of Ullal, the Queen of the Bednore dynasty. The first battle between Abbakka Rani and the Portuguese was fought in 1546, where she emerged victorious, and succeeded in driving the Portuguese out of South Canara.

== Migrations from Goa ==
Many of the Goan ancestors of the present Mangalorean Catholics fled Goa because of the Goa Inquisition introduced by the Portuguese in 1560 aimed to eradicate all culturally Hindu practices from the lives of the native converts. The Inquisition characterised any vestige of Hindu culture or Indian culture as heretical. Christian converts were banned from using Hindu names, attending any Hindu ceremonies including weddings, engaging the services of a Hindu doctor or midwife, wearing dhotis or cholis and planting tulsis (holy basils). Those Christians who were not prepared to give up completely their former Hindu practices were declared heretics and apostates and could be condemned to death. But some Christians of Goa were attached to some of their ancient Hindu customs, and refused to abandon them. Consequently, they lived in constant danger for their lives. Those who refused to comply with the rules laid down by the Inquisition were forced to leave Goa and to settle outside the Portuguese dominion. This migration is referred as the "First Wave of Migration".

It is interesting and instructive, in this light, to view the rituals and practices of Mangalorean Catholics. These Catholics of South fled from Goa (mainly from its northern districts) in successive waves. A large number fled to escape the scrutiny of the Inquisition. Among them the ritual substances banned by the Inquisition such as betel leaves, areca nuts, rice and flowers, continue to be employed in domestic celebrations and the pattern of ritual practices appears much more resemble forms described in the Inquisitorial edict.

— A.P.L. D'Souza, Popular Christianity: A Case Study among the Catholics of Mangalore

Under the provisional treaties between the Portuguese and the rulers of neighboring Bednore, the Christians were allowed to build churches and help the growth of Christianity in South Canara. In 1568, the Church of Nossa Senhora do Rosário de Mangalore (Our Lady of the Rosary of Mangalore) was erected by the Portuguese at Bolar in Mangalore. The Churches of Nossa Senhora de Mercês de Velala (Our Lady of Mercy of Ullal) and São Francisco de Assis Igreja (St. Francis of Assisi) at Farangipet were also erected by the Portuguese during the same time in South Canara. These three churches were highlighted by the Italian traveller Pietro Della Valle, who visited Mangalore in 1623.

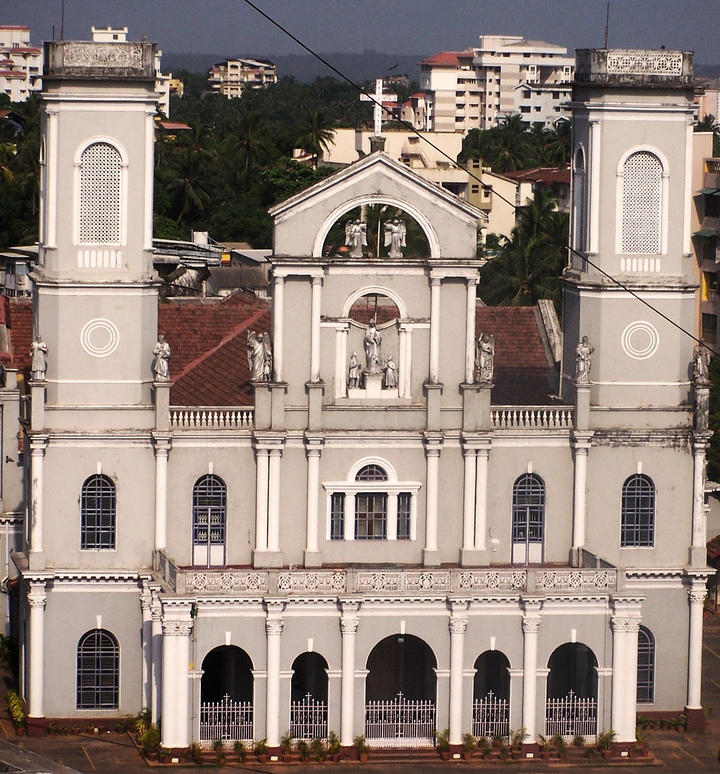
The Milagres Church, one of the oldest churches in South Canara, was built in 1680.

The Sultan of Bijapur attacked Goa in 1571. The Bijapur sultans were especially known for their loathing of Christianity. Fearing persecution, many Catholics from Goa migrated to South Canara. This migration is referred as the "Second Wave of Migration".

The Christians who left Goa were skilled cultivators who abandoned their irrigated fields in search of peace and freedom. At the time of migration, Canara was ruled by the Bednore King Shivappa Nayaka (1618–1663). He evinced great interest in the development of agriculture in his empire and welcomed these farmers to fertile lands. This was confirmed by Francis Buchanan, a Scottish physician, when he visited Canara in 1801. In his book, A Journey from Madras through the Countries of Mysore, Canara and Malabar (1807), he stated that "The princes of the house of Ikeri had given great encouragement to the Christians, and had induced 80,000 of them to settle in Tuluva." Later, this was identified as a probable mistake and should have read "8,000". However even this figure included the second emigration of Christians from Goa. Christians were also recruited into the armies of the Bednore dynasty. In the 16th and 17th centuries following the migration, local upper-caste Hindus like the Tulu Brahmins ignored the Christians. On account of their change of religion, they refused to associate with them and did not admit them into their houses. The Tulu Bunt castes, who were largely self-sufficient in South Canara, also never associated themselves with the Christians. More social contacts and cultural exchanges were however maintained with Konkani Hindus of the same castes as them, who like the Christians were refugees from Goa. The Christians would invite these Hindu relatives and neighbours to festivities and ceremonies such as births, weddings and funerals, and the Hindus used to accept such invitations.

The Milagres Church, one of the oldest churches in South Canara, was built in 1680 by Bishop Thomas de Castro, a Goan Catholic theatine priest who was appointed by Pope Clement X as the Vicar Apostolic of Canara. The arrival of the English East India Company and the Dutch East India Company halted the activity of the Portuguese and gradually the Portuguese were unable to send the required number of missionaries to Mangalore. The attacks of the Mahratta Confederacy on Goa, during the mid 17th century, was also a cause of migration. In 1664, Shivaji, the founder of the Maratha empire, attacked Kudal, a town north of Goa, and began his campaign for Goa. After Shivaji's death on 3 April 1680, his son Sambhaji wrested control of the Confederacy. The onslaught of Sambhaji, along the northern parts of Goa drove many Christians from their hometowns and villages, most of them migrated to South Canara. This migration is referred as the "Third Wave of Migration". From the Salcette area of Goa, according to one estimate, emigrations were around at the rate of 2,000 annually. From the Bardes area of Goa, Jesuit priests estimated that 12,000 Christians emigrated from Goa between 1710 and 1712, most of them going southward. A Portuguese era annul of 1747 presently in the Panjim archives recorded that around 5,000 Christians fled from the Bardes and Tiswadi areas of Goa during the invasion of the Mahrattas and Peshva Brahmins. It was estimated that during the Maratha raids on Goa, about 60,000 Christians migrated to South Canara. The migration slowed during the Moghul-Mahratta War in Konkan, because it kept Sambhaji busy, and some 10,000 Christians returned to Goa. According to Alan Machado Prabhu, the Mangalorean Catholics numbered about 58,000 by 1765.

== Hyder Ali ==
Hyder Ali occupied Mangalore in 1763. From 1766 to 1772, Hyder Ali took de facto control of the throne of the Mysore Kingdom through the Wodeyar dynasty. In February 1768, the English captured Mangalore from Hyder. The Portuguese had offered to help Hyder against the English. But when the Portuguese betrayed Hyder, he directed his anger towards the Mangalorean Catholics, who had been converted to Christianity by the Portuguese. Towards the end of 1768, Hyder defeated the English and captured Mangalore fort, where the Mangalorean Catholics were taking refuge. Around 15,675 of them were taken as prisoners to Mysore by Hyder. Only 204 returned; the rest died, were killed, or converted to Islam. After Hyder's death in the Second Anglo-Mysore War in December 1782, the British captured the fort again. Hyder was succeeded by his son Tippu Sultan. The Mangalorean Catholics helped the British in the fort by providing them rice, vegetables, and money. Tippu decided to come down heavily upon these Christians for providing aid to the British. On 20 May 1783, Tippu Sultan laid siege to the Mangalore fort, where the Mangalorean Catholics and English army were taking refuge. The fort was finally delivered to Tippu when the British capitulated it on 30 January 1784. More than 5,600 Mangalorean Catholics, who were condemned for treachery, were killed.

== Captivity at Seringapatam ==
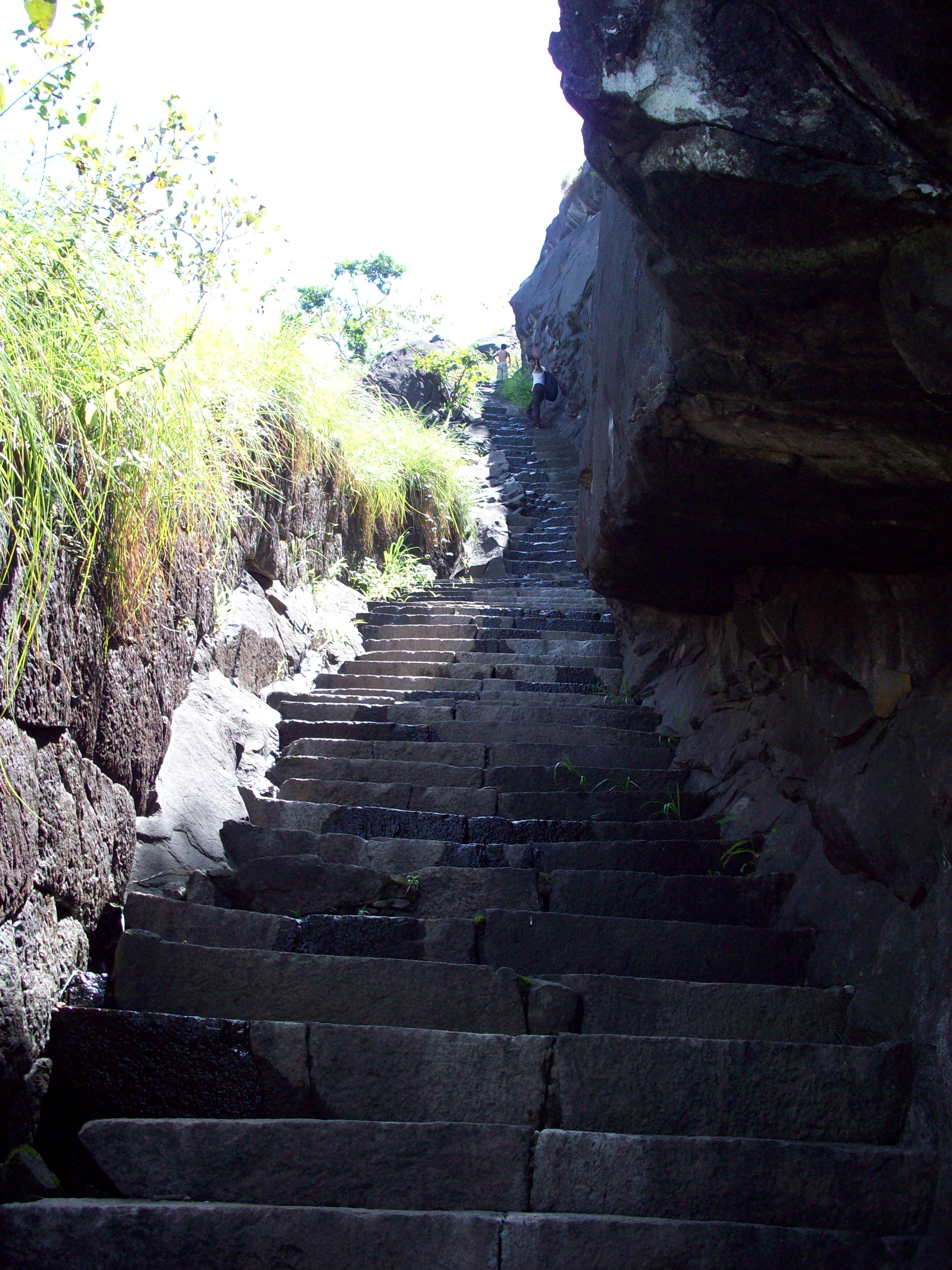
The Jamalabad fort route. Mangalorean Catholics had traveled through this route on their way to Seringapatam.

The captivity of Mangalorean Catholics at Seringapatam, which began on 24 February 1784 and ended on 4 May 1799, remains the most disconsolate memory in their history. Soon after the Treaty of Mangalore in 1784, Tippu gained control of Canara. He issued orders to seize the Christians in Canara, confiscate their estates, and deport them to Seringapatam, the capital of his empire, through the Jamalabad fort route. The account of the number of captives differ ranging from 30000 to 80,000. According to Thomas Munro, a Scottish soldier and the first collector of Canara, around 60,000 of them, nearly 92 percent of the entire Christian community of Canara, were captured, only 7,000 escaped. Francis Buchanan gives the numbers as 70,000 captured, from a population of 80,000, with 10,000 escaping. They were forced to climb nearly 4,000 feet (1,200 m) through the dense jungles and gorges of the Western Ghat mountain ranges along the Kulshekar-Virajpet-Coorg-Mysore route. It was 210 miles (340 km) from Mangalore to Seringapatam, and the journey took six weeks. According to the Barkur Manuscript, written in Canarese by a Mangalorean Catholic from Barkur after his return from Seringapatam, 20,000 of them (one-third) died on the march to Seringapatam due to hunger, disease and ill treatment by the soldiers. Those who resisted were thrown down from the Jamalabad fort route. According to James Scurry, a British officer, who was held captive along with Mangalorean Catholics, 30,000 of them were captured. The young women and girls were forcibly made wives of the Muslims living there. The young men who offered resistance were disfigured by cutting their noses, upper lips, and ears and paraded in the city. According to Mr. Silva of Gangolim, a survivor of the captivity, if a person who had escaped from Seringapatam was found, the punishment under the orders of Tipu was the cutting off of the ears, nose, the feet and one hand.

== British era (1799–1947) ==
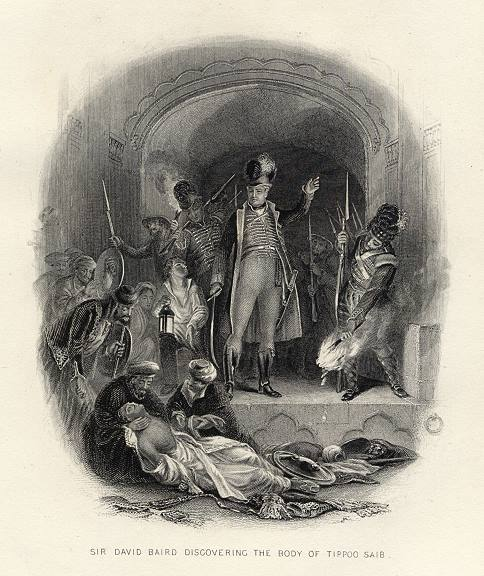
David Baird, a British officer, discovering the body of Tipu Sultan on 4 May 1799

In the Battle of Seringapatam on 4 May 1799, the British stormed the fortress, breached the town of Seringapatam, and killed Tippu. After his death in the Fourth Anglo-Mysore War, the Mangalorean Catholics were freed from his captivity. Of the 60,000–80,000 Mangalorean Catholics taken captive, only 15,000–20,000 made it out as Christians. After deliverance from captivity, while returning home to South Canara the King of Coorg offered the Mangalorean Catholics safe stay in their lands and many of them settled in Coorg. British general Arthur Wellesley helped 10,000 of them return to South Canara and resettle on their lands. According to the Mangalorean genealogist Michael Lobo, the present Mangalorean Catholic community is descended almost entirely from this small group of survivors. Later, the British took over South Canara. In 1800, they took a census of the region. Of the 396,672 people living in South Canara, 10,877 were Christians. Padre José Miguel Luis de Mendes, a Goan Catholic priest, was appointed Vicar of Our Lady of Rosary at Mangalore on 7 December 1799. He took a lot of interest in the re-establishment of the community from 1799 to 1808. Later, British general John Goldsborough Ravenshaw II was appointed collector of South Canara. He took active part in the re-establishment of their former possessions and recovery of their estates. He constructed a church for them, which was completed in 1806. Their population almost doubled in 1818. According to various parish books existing that time, Mangalorean Catholics numbered 19,068 in South Canara (12,877 in Mangalore and Bantwal, 3,918 in Moolki, 2,273 in Cundapore and Barcoor). Seventeen churches which were earlier destroyed by Tippu were rebuilt. After relocation, the community prospered under the British, and the jurisdiction of the Archbishop of Goa commenced again. Regarding the Christians, Stokes mentioned, "They have raised themselves to a name unquestionably the most respectable in every situation in which they move in Kanara, whether as holding high public". The Mangalorean Catholics gradually prospered under the British.

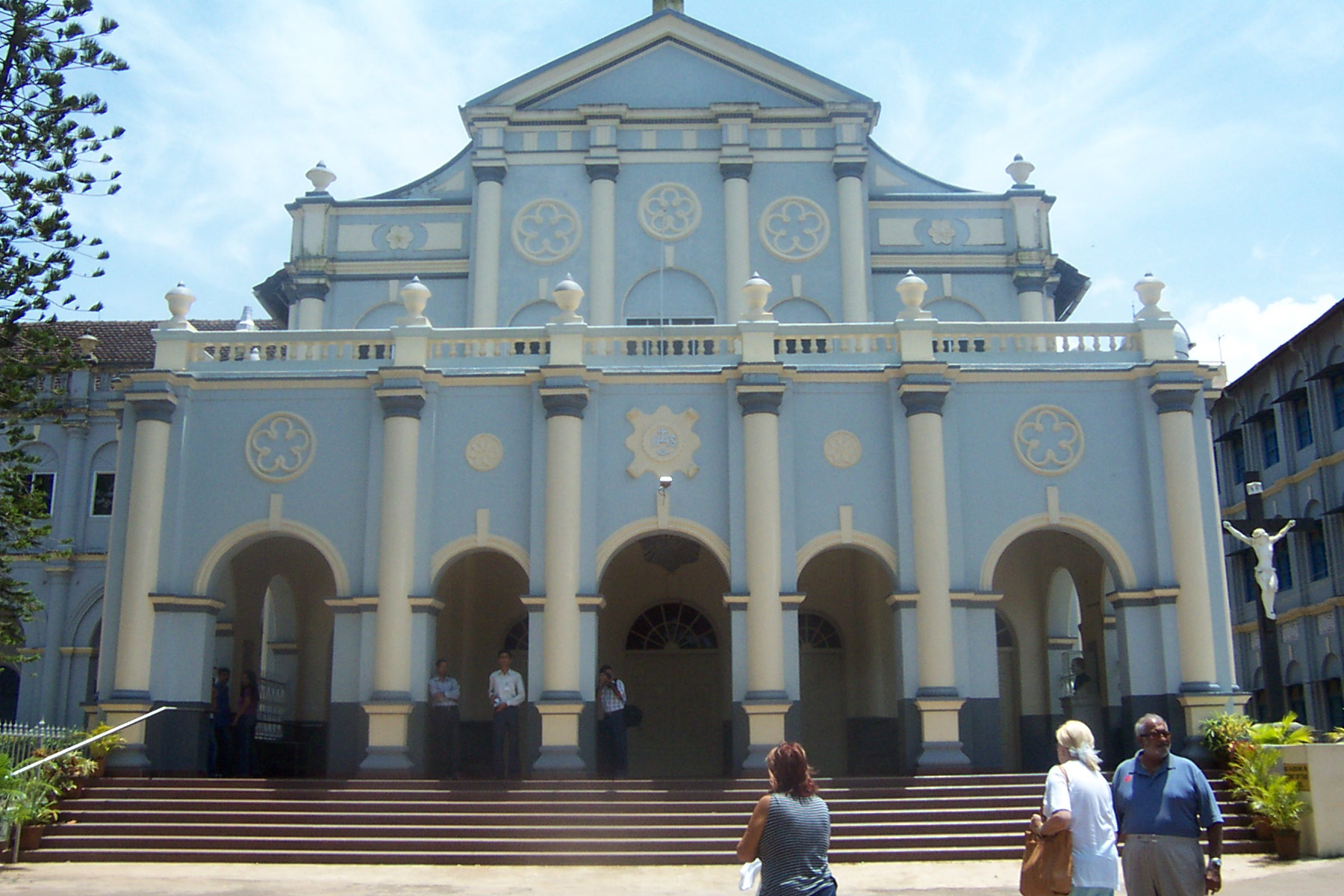
The St Aloysius Chapel in Mangalore, built by the Italian Jesuit Antonio Moscheni in 1884, during the Mangalore Mission (1878)

The opening of the Protestant German Basel Mission of 1834 in Mangalore brought many handicraft and tile-manufacturing industries to the region and led to a large-scale rise in employment. In 1836–7, when the political situation in Portugal was in turmoil, Antonio Feliciano de Santa Rita Carvalho, a Portuguese priest, was appointed Archbishop-elect of Goa in September 1836 without authorization from the Pope. Many Mangalorean Catholics did not accept the leadership of Carvalho but instead submitted to the Vicar Apostolic of Verapoly in Travancore, while some of them continued to be under the jurisdiction of Goa. The parishes in South Canara were divided into two groups—one under Goa and the other under Verapoly. Under the leadership of Joachim Pius Noronha, a Mangalorean Catholic priest, and John Joseph Saldanha, a Mangalorean Catholic judge, the Mangalorean Catholics sent a petition to the Holy See in 1840 to establish Mangalore as a separate Vicariate to ward off the differences. Conceding to their request, Pope Gregory XVI established Mangalore as a separate Vicariate on 17 February 1845 under the Verapoly Carmelites. The Mangalore Mission was then transferred to the French Carmelites by a Bull dated 3 January 1870. During the regime of Carmelites, the Mangalorean Catholics constantly sent memorandums to the Holy See to send Jesuits to Mangalore to start institutions for higher education, since the youth frequently had to go to Bombay and Madras for educational purposes. The Roman Catholic Church studied the situation and Pope Leo XIII by the Brief of 27 September 1878 handed over the Mangalore mission to the Italian Jesuit of Naples, who reached Mangalore on 31 December 1878. The Italian Jesuits played an important role in education, health, and social welfare of the community and built the St. Aloysius College in 1880, St Aloysius Chapel in 1884, and many other institutions and churches. On 25 January 1887, Pope Leo XIII established the Diocese of Mangalore, which is considered to be an important landmark in the community's history. In 1901, Mangalorean Catholics accounted for 76,000 of the total 84,103 Christians in South Canara., while in 1962, they numbered 186,741. During the mid-nineteenth century, Bishop Victor R. Fernandes, a Mangalorean Catholic priest, erected a large cross at former outskirts of Mangalore in Nanthoor near Padav hills to honour the memory of Mangalorean Catholic martyrs who died on the march and during their 15-year captivity at Seringapatam. During the later 20th century, they started migrating to other parts of India, especially Bombay and Bangalore. Till 1930 it was boom time when educated young Mangalorean Catholic men were drawn to Bombay from Mangalore in search of lucrative employment. The lower working class received no support from those of the upper class of their community in Bombay, Westernisation of habits and the rejection of the mother tongue was the reason for a sharp cleavage between the two classes. In 1930s, the profession taken up by the lower classes were as taxi drivers and fitters and as domestic service in homes. The men lived in koods mainly in Central and South Bombay. There were about 400 Mangalorean Catholics then in Bombay. The first Mangalorean Catholic to settle down in Madras in the 1940s was Dewan Bahadur Alexio Pinto.

== Independent India (1947–present) ==
During the 1970s, coastal communication increased between Bombay and Mangalore, after introduction of ships by the London based trade firm Shepherd. These ships facilitated the entry of Mangalorean Catholics to Bombay. The bicentenary anniversary of the release from captivity was widely celebrated on 4 May 1999 by the Mangalorean Catholic community. Five Catholics walked from Seringapatam to Mangalore to retrace the 278 km route that Tippu Sultan forced the Christians to take in 1784. The commemorative march ended on 11 May at the Rosario Cathedral, Mangalore. Events related to Mangalorean Catholics that took place in Mangalore, and made national headlines were the attacks on Christian churches in September 2008.

== Bibliography ==
- Farias, Kranti (1999). The Christian Impact in South Kanara. Church History Association of India.
- "History" (PDF). South Kanara District Gazetteer. Karnataka State Gazetteer. Vol. 12. Gazetteer Department (Government of Karnataka). 1973. pp. 33–85.
- "People" (PDF). South Kanara District Gazetteer. Karnataka State Gazetteer. Vol. 12. Gazetteer Department (Government of Karnataka). 1973. pp. 86–125. Archived from the original (PDF) on 25 March 2009.
- Prabhu, Alan Machado (1999). Sarasvati's Children: A History of the Mangalorean Christians. I.J.A. Publications. ISBN 978-81-86778-25-8.
- Shastry, Bhagamandala Seetharama; Borges, Charles J. (2000). Goa-Kanara Portuguese relations, 1498-1763. Concept Publishing Company. ISBN 978-81-7022-848-6.
- Silva, Severine; Fuchs, Stephen (1965). The Marriage Customs of the Christians in South Canara, India (PDF). 2. Vol. 24. Asian Folklore Studies, Nanzan University (Japan). Archived from the original (PDF) on 20 March 2012.
- Anvita Abbi; R. S. Gupta; Ayesha Kidwai (1997). Linguistic Structure and Language Dynamics in South Asia: Papers from the Proceedings of SALA XVIII Roundtable. Motilal Banarsidass Publications. ISBN 978-81-208-1765-4.
- Ayyappapanicker, K. (1997). Medieval Indian Literature: An Anthology. Sahitya Akademi. ISBN 81-260-0365-0.
- Baptista, Elsie Wilhelmina (1967). The East Indians: Catholic Community of Bombay, Salsette and Bassein. Bombay East Indian Association.
- Bowring, Lewin B. (1893). Haidar Ali and Tipu Sultan and the Struggle with the Musalman Powers of the South. IDARAH-I ADABIYAT-I DELLI. ISBN 978-81-206-1299-0. Archived from the original on 17 August 2011.
- Pious Society of St. Paul; Catholic Church Bishops' Conference of India (1972). The Catholic Directory for India. St. Paul Publications.
- Forrest, George W. (1887). Selections from the Letters, Despatches, and Other State Papers Preserved in the Bombay Secretariat. Vol. 2. Bombay: Government Central Press.
- George, K. M. (1992). Modern Indian Literature, an Anthology: An Anthology: Surveys and Poems. Vol. I. Sahitya Akademi. ISBN 978-81-7201-324-0.
- Giriappa, S. (1994). Rural Industrialisation in Backward Areas. Daya books. ISBN 81-7035-125-1.
- Gupta, Anirudha (1991). Minorities on India's West Coast: History & Society. Kalinga Publications. ISBN 81-85163-22-7.
- Heras Institute of Indian History and Culture (1983). Indica. Vol. 20. St. Xavier's College (Bombay).
- Hunter, William Wilson; James Sutherland Cotton; Richard Burn; William Stevenson Meyer; Great Britain India Office (1909). The Imperial Gazetteer of India. Clarendon Press.
- James Scurry; William Whiteway (1824). The Captivity, Sufferings, and Escape of James Scurry, who was Detained a Prisoner During Ten Years, in the Dominions of Hyder Ali and Tippoo Saib. H. Fisher.
- Kelley, Gerald B.; Edward C. Dimock; Braj B. Kachru (1992). Dimensions of Sociolinguistics in South Asia: Papers in Memory of Gerald B. Kelley. Oxford & IBH Pub. Co. ISBN 978-81-204-0573-8.
- Kurzon, Dennis (2003). Where East Looks West: Success in English in Goa and on the Konkan Coast. Multilingual Matters. ISBN 1-85359-673-6.
- Lobo, Michael (1999). Mangaloreans World-wide: An International Directory of the Mangalorean Catholic Community. Camelot Publishers. ISBN 81-87609-00-1.
- Maffei, Angelus Francis Xavier (2003). A Konkani Grammar. Mangalore: Asian Educational Services. ISBN 978-81-206-0087-4.
- Maffei, Angelus Francis Xavier (2001). English-konkani Dictionary. Mangalore: Asian Educational Services. ISBN 81-206-0626-4.
- Naimpalli, Sadanand (2005). Theory and Practice of Tabla. Popular Prakashan. ISBN 81-7991-149-7.
- Nair, P. Thankappan (2004). South Indians in Kolkata: History of Kannadigas, Konkanis, Malayalees, Tamilians, Telugus, South Indian Dishes, and Tippoo Sultan's Heirs in Calcutta. Punthi Pustak. ISBN 81-86791-50-7.
- Oddie, Geoffrey A. (1991). Hindu and Christian in South-east India: Aspects of Religious Continuity and Change, 1800-1900. Routledge. ISBN 978-0-913215-55-5.
- Oddie, Geoffrey A. (1991). Religion in South Asia: Religious Conversion and Revival Movements in South Asia in Medieval and Modern Times. Manohar.
- Pai, C. C. A.; Supriya (1981). Konknni Huminnyom (Konkani Riddles): an Anthropological Analysis of the Konkany Riddles of Mangalore Catholics. Satabdi Prakasan.
- Royal Geographical Society (Great Britain) (1856). A Gazetteer of the World: Or, Dictionary of Geographical Knowledge, Compiled from the Most Recent Authorities, and Forming a Complete Body of Modern Geography — Physical, Political, Statistical, Historical, and Ethnographical. A. Fullarton.
- Saradesaya, Manohararaya (2000). A History of Konkani Literature: From 1500 to 1992. Sahitya Akademi. ISBN 81-7201-664-6.
- Sen, Colleen Taylor (2004). Food Culture in India. Greenwood Publishing Group. ISBN 0-313-32487-5.
- D'Sa, Victor (1972). "The Marriage Customs of the Christians in South Canara (India)" (PDF). Asian Folklore Studies. 1. 31 (1). Nanzan University (Japan): 71–87. doi:10.2307/1177538. JSTOR 1177538. Archived from the original (PDF, 0.2803 MB) on 22 July 2011.
- Silva, Severine (1961). History of Christianity in Canara. Vol. I. Coompta, North Canara: Star of Kanara Press.
- Somerset, Playne; Bond, E. W.; Wright, Arnold; Wright, Playne (2004). Southern India: Its History, People, Commerce, and Industrial Resources. Asian Educational Services. ISBN 81-206-1344-9.
- Wellesley, Arthur (Arthur Wellesley Wellington); John Gurwood (1834). The dispatches of Field Marshal the Duke of Wellington, during his various campaigns in India, Denmark, Portugal, Spain, the Low Countries, and France, from 1799 to 1818. Vol. 1 (New ed.). London, Great Britain: John Murray. "compiled from official and authentic documents by Lieutenant Colonel Gurwood"
- "Sufferings of the Canarese Christians". The Gentleman's Magazine. Vol. CIII. F. Jefferies. 1833.
- The Oriental Herald. Vol. 3. 1824.
