= Milagres Church (Mangalore) =

Roman Catholic Church in Mangalore, India

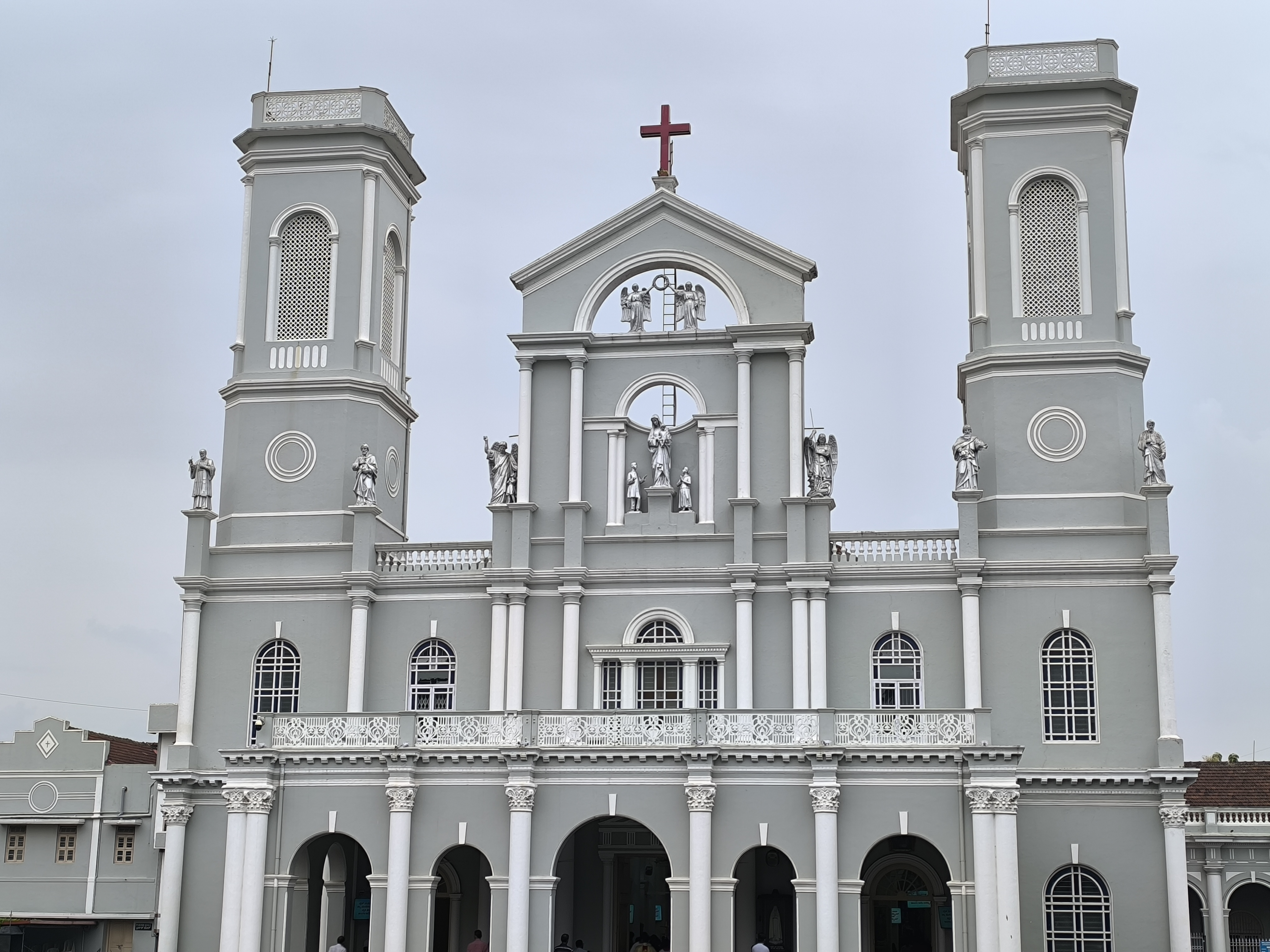
- Milagres Church in 2024

- Location in India
- Former names: Igreja de Nossa Senhora dos Milagres
- Alternative names: Church of Our Lady of Miracles

General information
- Location: Hampankatta, Mangalore, Dakshina Kannada district,, India
- Coordinates: 12°52′03″N 74°50′40″E
- Completed: 1680

Design and construction
- Architect: Bishop Thomas de Castro

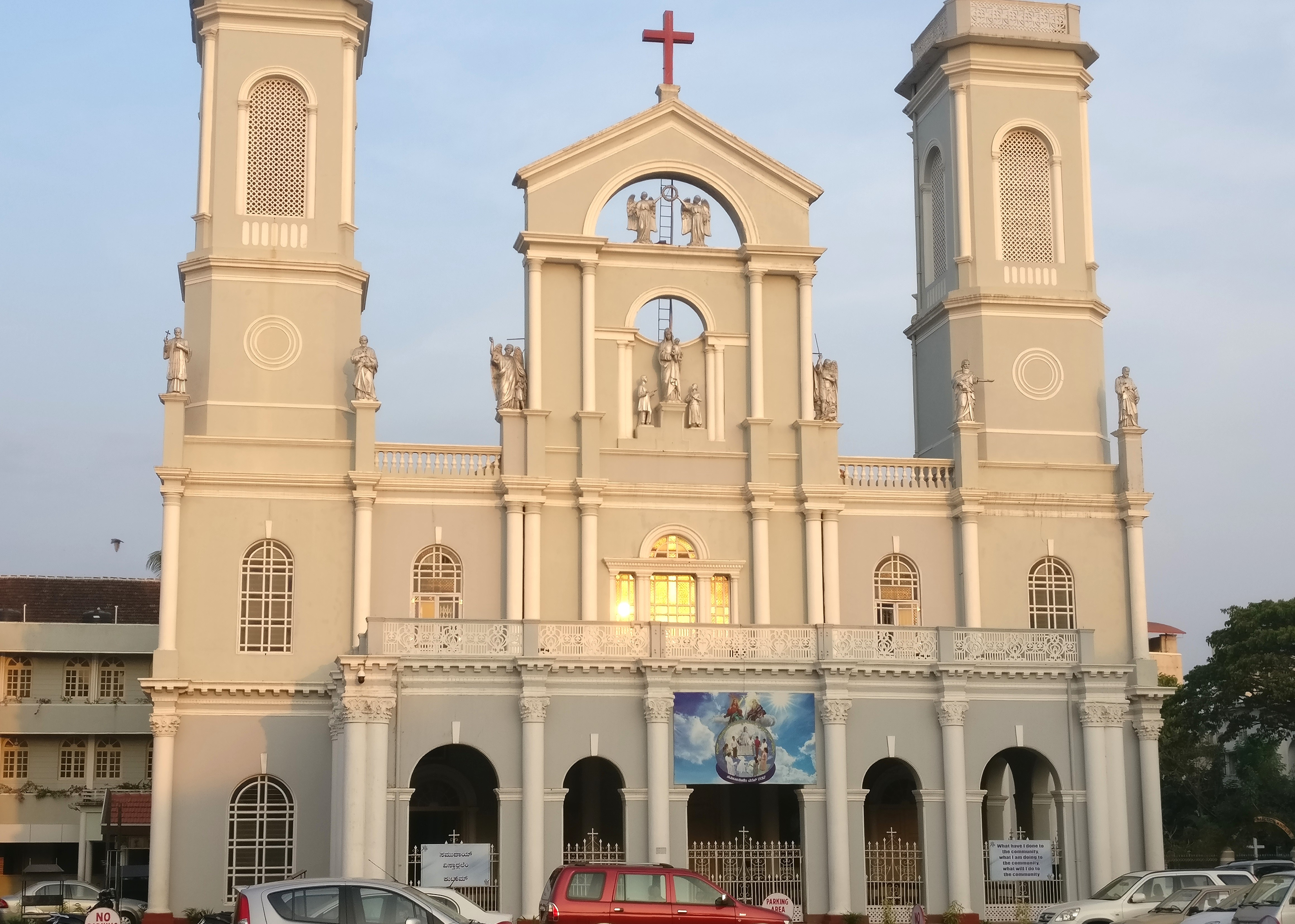
Milagres Church in 2017

The Milagres Church (Portuguese: Igreja de Nossa Senhora dos Milagres, English: Church of Our Lady of Miracles) is a historic Roman Catholic Church situated in the Hampankatta locality of Mangalore. The church was built in 1680 by Bishop Thomas de Castro, a Theatine from Divar, Goa. The original structure was constructed at the site of the present-day cemetery. It is one of the oldest churches in Dakshina Kannada.

== First Milagres Church (1680−1784) ==
Local tradition has it that the Idgah mosque in Mangalore (opposite St. Aloysius College), was constructed by Tipu Sultan. During the construction, some stones were given to the semi-destroyed Milagres Church to help with its rebuilding.

Due to its substantial Roman Catholic population, Mangalore occupied a prominent place in the church administration in India during the 17th century. The Goan Catholics who migrated to Canara lacked priestly leadership, as many of the migrant priests had returned to Goa when the Portuguese withdrew from the region. In 1658, a Carmelite missionary, Fr. Vincento Maria de Santa Catharina visited Canara and reported to Rome about the miserable state of Christianity in that region. The Holy See came to the aid of the Canara Christians, and appointed a Theatine, Bishop Thomas de Castro as the Vicar Apostolic of Canara and Malabar in 1674. Bishop de Castro arrived in Mangalore in 1677, and received a piece of land from the Keladi Queen Chennamma as gift. After the church was constructed there in 1680, he took up residency in its quarters. Bishop de Castro died on 16 July 1684, and his remains were buried in the south eastern corner of the cemetery, where his grave may be identified by its bronze slab next to the St. Monica Chapel.

After Queen Chennamma's death, the land was repossessed by her successor, King Basavappa. In 1715, a local priest Fr. Pinto secured the land again from Somashekara II. His nephew Fr. Alfred Pinto who succeeded him, built a new church at the site of the present church in 1756. In 1763, Canara fell under the suzerainty of Hyder Ali and then his son Tipu Sultan in 1782. Believing that the local Christians had conspired against him with the British during the Second Anglo-Mysore War; Tipu captured about 60,000 Mangalorean Catholics on Ash Wednesday 24 February 1784, and herded them to his capital at Seringapatam. In the same year, he freed them.

== Present structure ==
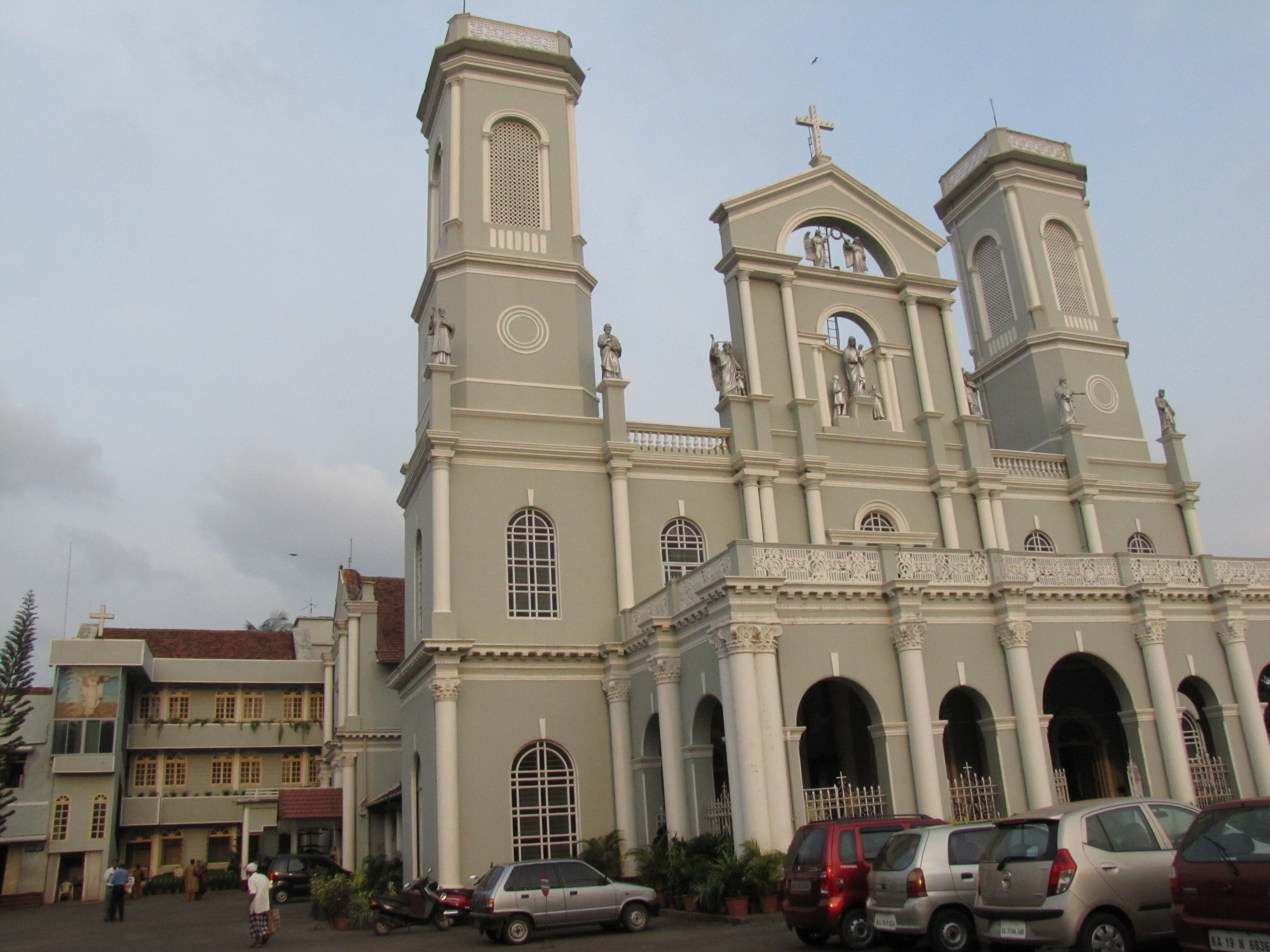
Close-up of Milagres Church

After Tipu Sultan, the Sultan of Mysore was killed by the British during the Fourth Anglo-Mysore War on 4 May 1799, the Mangalorean Catholics—who had supported the British Raj—were freed from captivity. Most subsequently returned to Mangalore. Among them was a baker, Lawrence Bello, who built a chapel to replace the demolished church, at a cost of Rs. 400. Fr. Mendez, the Vicar Apostolic secured the necessary furniture, and together with Tipu's former munshi Salvador Pinto, raised funds and obtained a grant of Rs. 600 to rebuild the church from the British government. He laid the foundation stone for a new church in 1811. In 1911, the facade of the church collapsed, following which then incumbent Parish priest Fr. Frank Pereira erected the present church structure with Fr. Diamanti S.J. as the architect. A portico was added later to the structure. The church was renovated in 2022.

== Institutions ==
As part of the overall Church Group, they run Milagres College and Milagres Hall Complex.

== See also ==
- Tourist attractions in Mangalore
- St. Paul's Church, Mangalore
- Our Lady of Rosary Cathedral, Mangalore
- Catedral de Nossa Senhora dos Milagres
