= Thomas de Castro =

Indian missionary

Dom Thomas de Castro (c.1621-1684) was a native of Divar in Goa, Portuguese India. The Holy See appointed him Vicar Apostolic of Canara on 30 August 1675. He later founded the famous Milagres Church in Mangalore, South Canara, Karnataka. He was the nephew of Dom Matheus de Castro (c.1594−1677), the first Indian Bishop of The Catholic Church.

== Biography ==
While in his teens he was taken to Rome by his uncle Matheus de Castro Bishop of Chrysopolis. there he joined the congregation of Divina Providencia or the Theatine order. It is recorded that in Rome he was appointed professor of Philosophy and Theology and Prefect of the aspirants for various sacerdotal degrees. He was consecrated Bishop of Fulsivelem by the Vatican in 1671.

In 1674, he arrived in India to begin his missionary work. On 30 August 1675, the Holy See appointed him the Vicar Apostolic for the kingdoms of Cochin, Tamor, Madurai, Mysore, Cranganore, Cannanore and the Coast of Canara. He also remained the Vicar Apostolic of the Latin Catholic Archdiocese of Verapoly (1675–1689), in present-day Varappuzha in Kerala.

He was gifted land by the rulers of Canara, on which he built the Milagres Church, Mangalore, Karnataka. Completed in 1680, this church is a prominent place of worship for Mangalorean Catholics. Bishop de Castro died in Mangalore on 16 July 1684 at the age of 68 years, his grave in the Milagres Church cemetery can be identified by a bronze slab next to the St. Monica Chapel.

== See also ==
- History of Mangalorean Catholics
