= Ideal Ice Cream =

Ice cream brand of India

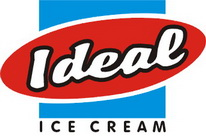
- Ideal Ice Cream' current logo
- Industry: Retail
- Founded: 1 May 1975; 51 years ago in Mangaluru, India
- Founder: Prabhakar Kamath
- Headquarters: Mangalore, Karnataka, India
- Products: Ice cream
- Website: idealicecream.com

Ideal Ice Cream is an Indian ice cream manufacturer based in Mangaluru, Karnataka. Founded on 1 May 1975 by Prabhakar Kamath, the company is one of the leading ice cream brands in the coastal Karnataka region and operates a network of outlets across Karnataka, Goa and northern Kerala.

The company is best known for its signature dessert, the Gadbad, a layered sundae consisting of ice cream, jelly, fruits and dry fruits. Over the years, Ideal Ice Cream has received several awards at national ice cream and frozen dessert competitions.

Pabbas, located on M.G. Road in Mangaluru, is the company's flagship outlet.

== See also ==
- Economy of Mangalore

== External sources ==
- Official Website
