= Pabbas =

Ice cream parlour in Mangalore, India

Pabbas is an ice cream parlour in the city of Mangalore, Karnataka, India. It is an outlet of the parent brand Ideal Ice Cream, and consistently listed as one of the must visit places when in or around Mangalore.

The flavours of ice cream at Pabbas include the Gadbad, Pabbas Special and Tiramisu. The restaurant provides dine-in and takeaway services.
