= Our Lady of Rosary Cathedral, Mangalore =

Catholic church in India

Our Lady of Rosary of Mangalore Mangalore Cathedral
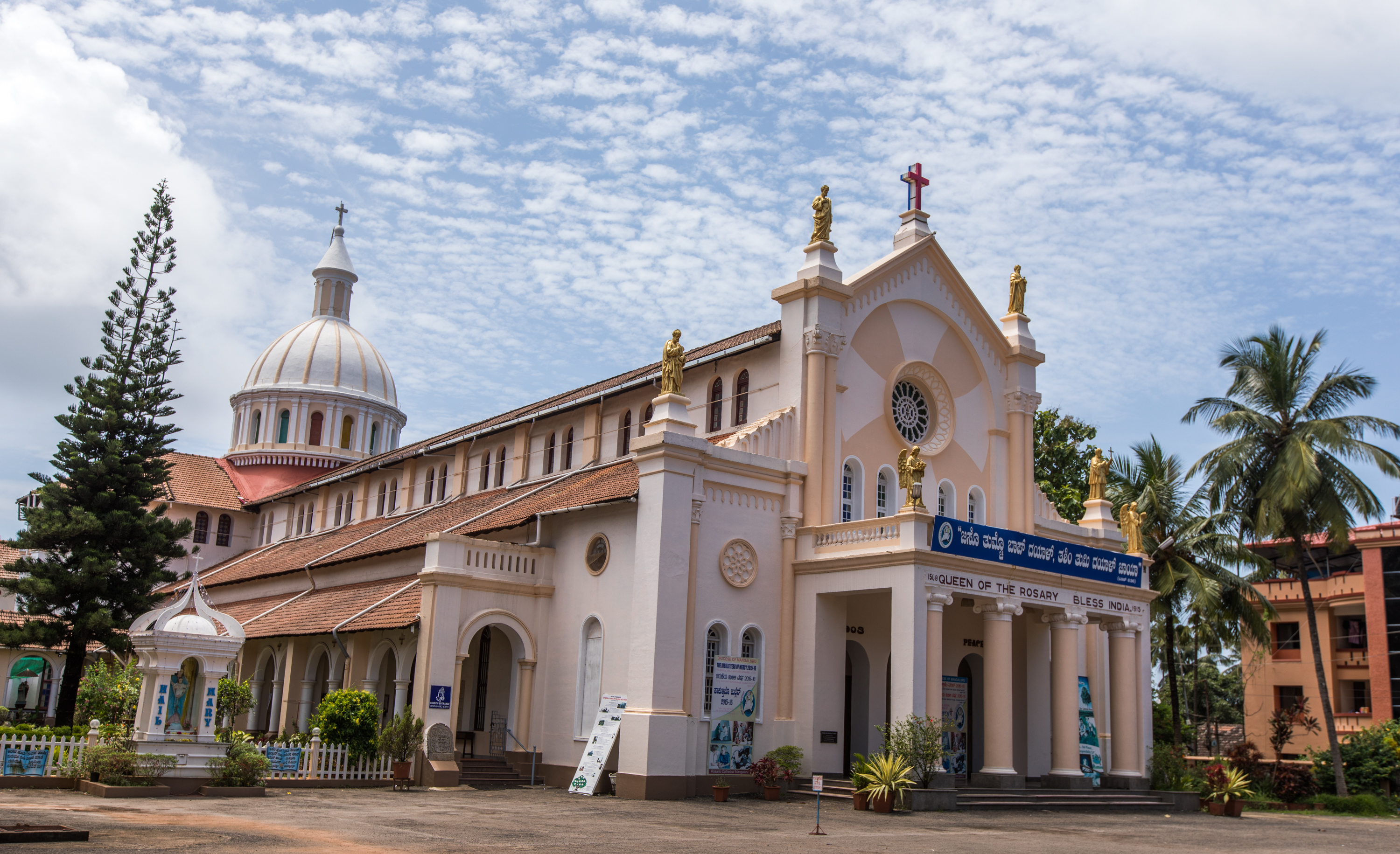

Religion
- Affiliation: Roman Catholic
- Diocese: Dakshina Kannada
- Rite: Latin Church, Roman Rite
- Ecclesiastical or organizational status: Active
- Year consecrated: 1568

Location
- Location: Mangalore, Karnataka
- Country: India
- Interactive map of Our Lady of Rosary of Mangalore; Mangalore Cathedral
- Coordinates: 12°51′22″N 74°50′12″E

Architecture
- Style: Baroque architecture

Website
- rosariocathedral.org

Church of Our Lady of Rosary of Mangalore (Portuguese: Igreja Nossa Senhora do Rosário de Mangalore), or Rosario Cathedral is a Catholic cathedral in the Diocese of Mangalore, dedicated to Our Lady of the Rosary. It was the first Catholic church in the Kanara region.

Historically, this was the only parish church in Mangalore reserved for the high-caste Mangalorean Catholics. It is the oldest church in Karnataka.

== History ==
The church of Our Lady of Rosary of Mangalore was originally the church of the old Portuguese factory. It was built by the Portuguese in 1568. Oral tradition states that the image of the Virgin Mary at the high altar was found by the fishermen at sea; when it got caught in their net. It was later brought to the church and installed there.

The church was the main centre of devotion for the Bamonn caste who revered the image of Our Lady of the Rosary on the high-altar. It was mentioned by the Italian traveller Pietro Della Valle, when he visited Mangalore in 1623.

The church was desecrated and destroyed by Mysorean ruler Tipu Sultan in 1784. Reconstruction of the church later began in 1813. In 1910, the structure of the old cathedral was demolished and the present cathedral erected in its place. The church of Our Lady of Rosary is the only church in the Mangalore Diocese which has a dome crowning the spacious sanctuary. The cross on the cathedral's dome was traditionally lit every night to serve as a beacon for seafarers. The royal stone emblem of the Portuguese king marking their landing at Mangalore lies at the entrance of the church.

In 1851, the Church of Our Lady of Rosary, Mangalore, was declared a cathedral. In 1910, Henry Buzzoni a Jesuit priest started further beautification of the cathedral. The formal dedication was done in 1915 by Bishop Paul Perini of Mangalore (1910–28).

== Structure ==
The architect of the new cathedral was a Jesuit brother, Divo of Bombay. The structure consists of a series of matching arches, with 48 major arches, 12 central arches and 50 sub-arches. The peripheral verandah has around 45 small arches.

The dome is a replica of the St. Peter's Basilica, Vatican City, with heavy metal ribs, minor re-enforcements of metal, red brick and mortar water-proofed using indigenous techniques. In years gone by, the dome of the cathedral could be seen by ships approaching the Mangalore harbour, and was a beautiful sight.

== Mass Timings ==
Regular mass timings on sundays are 8 am in Konkani and 10.30 am in English language.
