= Shoba (name) =

Shoba is a name. Notable people with the name include:

- Mahalakshmi Menon, best known by her stagename Shobha (1962–1980), Indian actress
- Shoba Chandrasekhar (born 1956), Indian singer
- Shoba Narayan, Indian author
- Shoba Purushothaman, Malaysian entrepreneur
- Shoba Ranganathan, Indian Australian biochemist
- Shoba Sivaprasad Wadhia, American lawyer
- Shoba Sivasankar, Indian geneticist
- Jan Shoba, leader in the Azanian People's Liberation Army
