= Mannuthy =

Mannuthy Mannuthi
- suburb
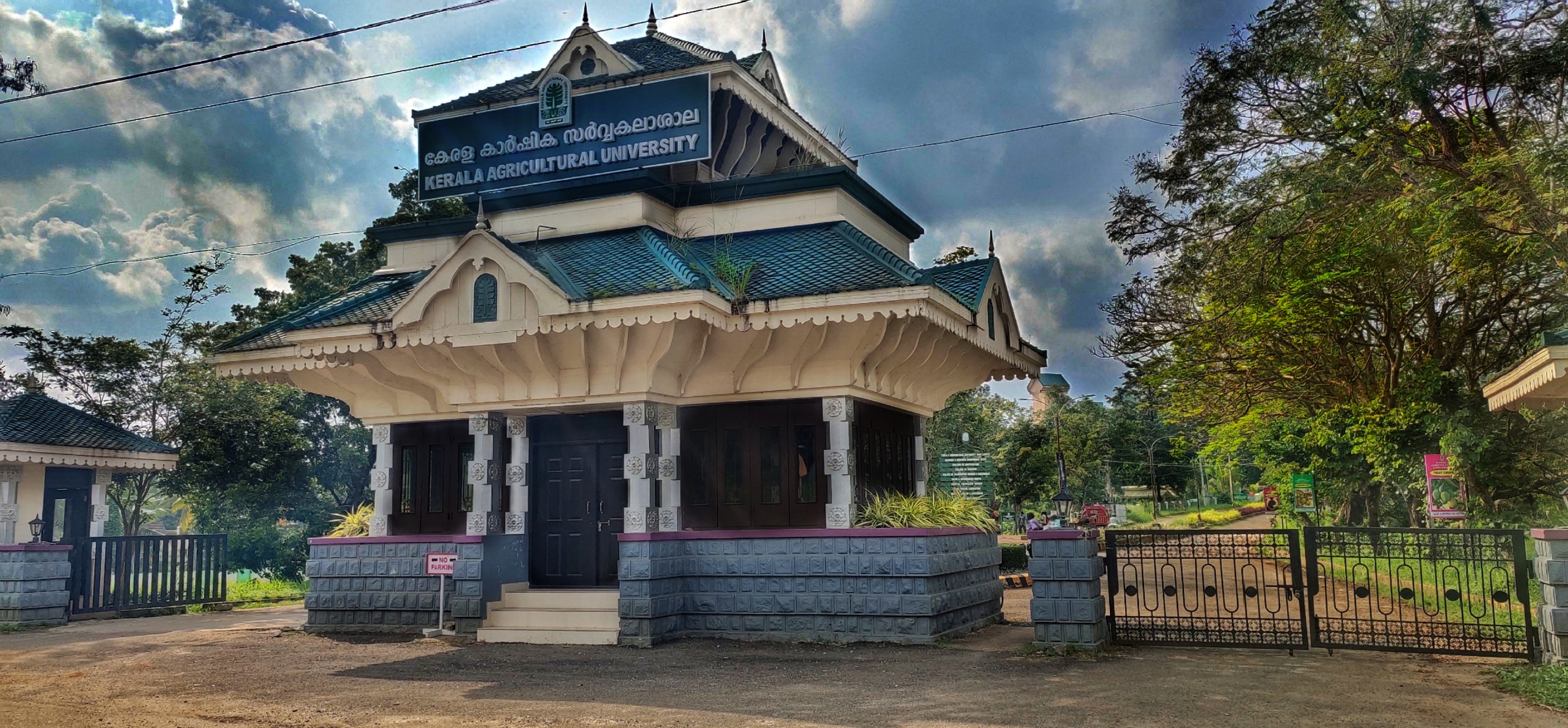
- Entrance of Kerala Agricultural University
- Nickname: Nursery Hub of India
- Location in Kerala, India
- Coordinates: 10.52891°N 76.262412°E
- Country: India
- State: Kerala
- District: Thrissur

Government
  - Body: Thrissur Municipal Corporation

Languages
  - Official: Malayalam, English
- Time zone: UTC+5:30 (IST)
- PIN: 680651
- Telephone code: 487-237
- Vehicle registration: KL-08
- Nearest city: Thrissur
- Lok Sabha constituency: Thrissur Lok Sabha constituency
- Civic agency: Thrissur Municipal Corporation

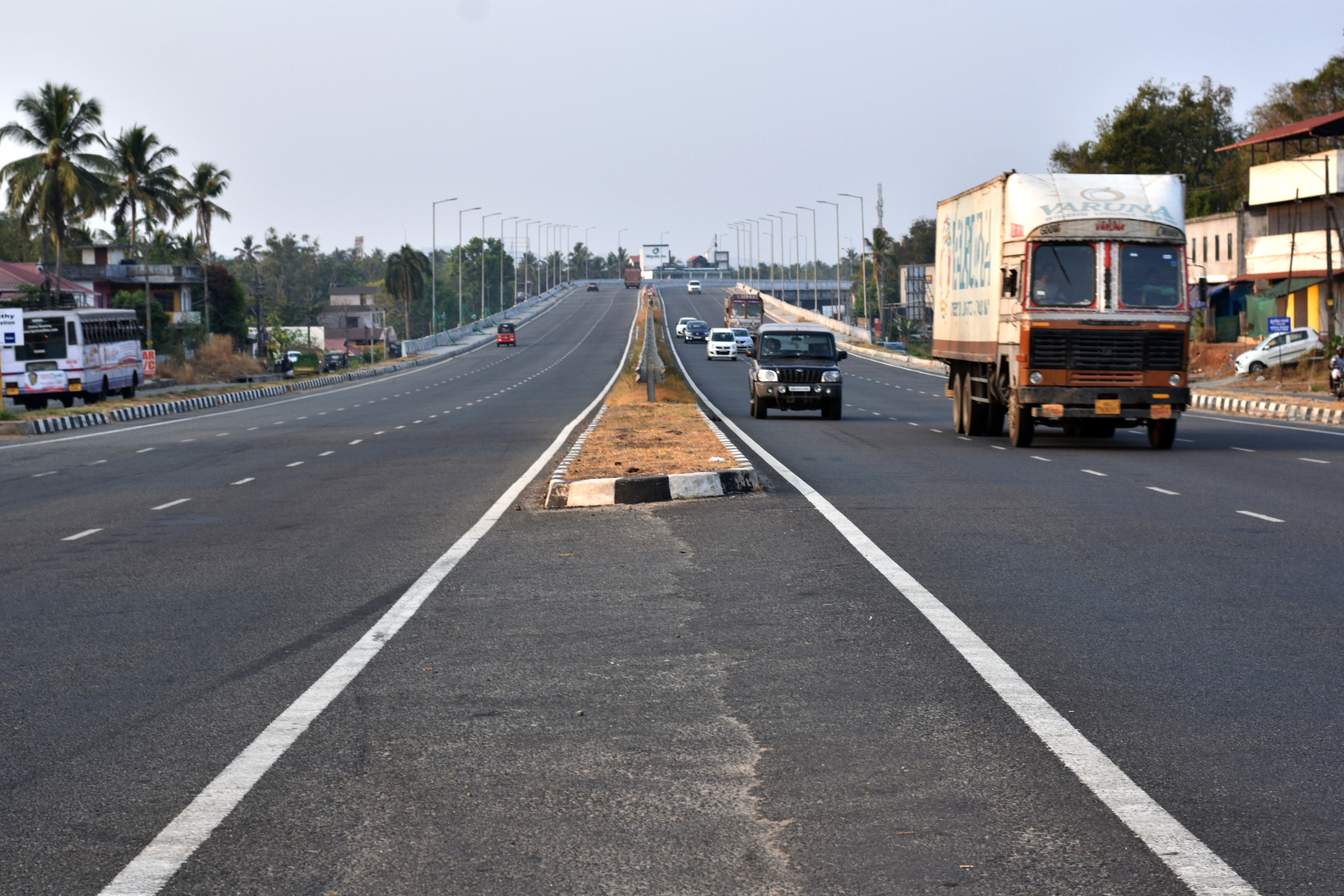
Flyover in Mannuthy

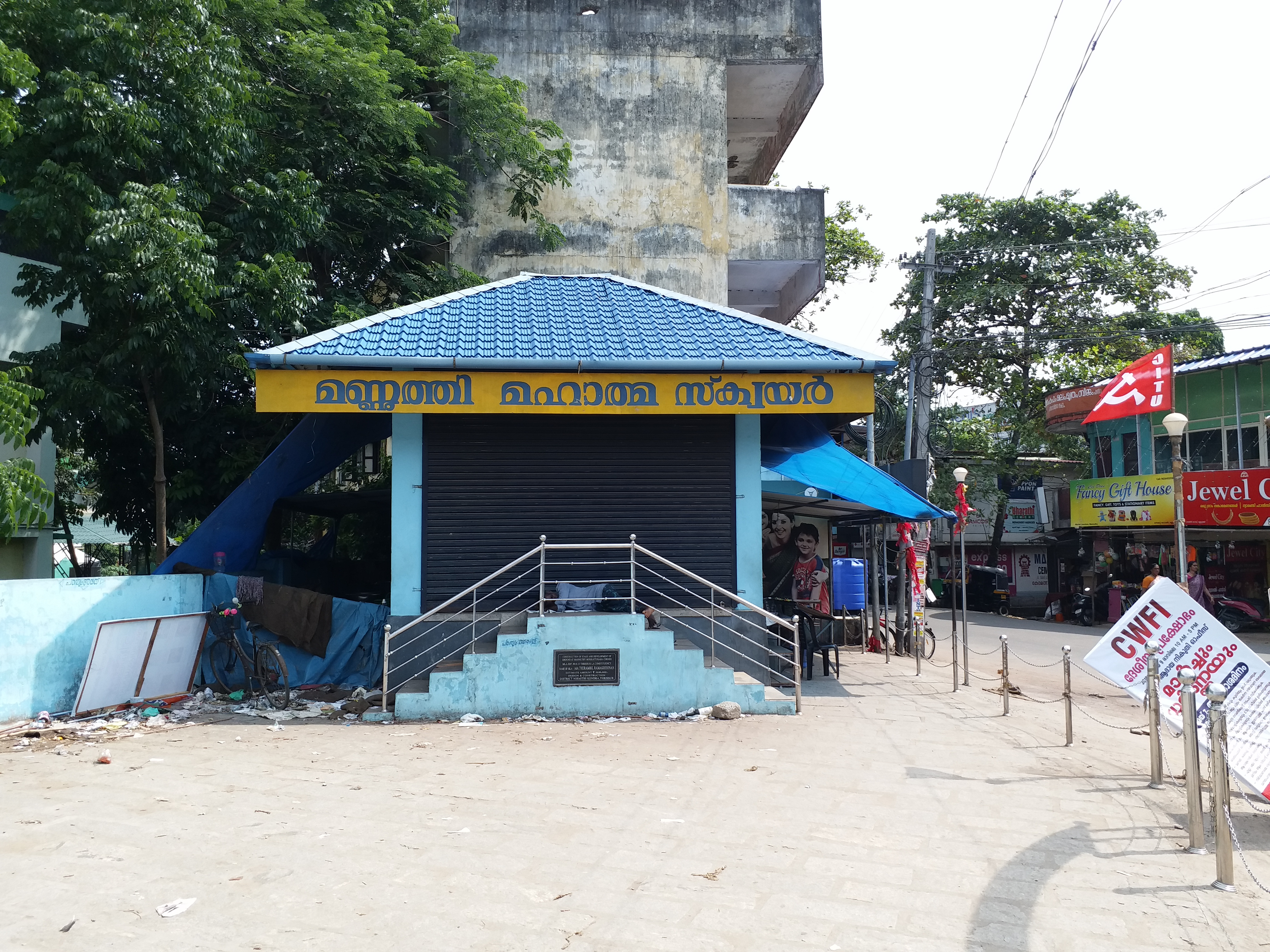
MahatmaSquareMannuthy

Mannuthy is suburb area on National Highway 544 of Thrissur city of Kerala, India. Mannuthy is Ward 13 of Thrissur Municipal Corporation. Kerala Agricultural University is situated in Vellanikkara near Mannuthy. Mannuthy is also a center for government and private educational institutions including the

- College of Forestry, Vellanikkara
- Agricultural Technology Information Centre Mannuthy (ATIC)
- College of Agriculture Vellanikkara (Kerala Agricultural University)
- Krishi Vigyan Kendra, Mannuthy (KVK)
- Kerala Veterinary College, Mannuthy
- Agricultural Research Station
- College of Dairy Science and Technology
- Don Bosco High School
- Don Bosco College, Mannuthy
- Holy Family School Mannuthy
- Marymatha Major Seminary and Calcus Technologies.
- VVS High school Mannuthy

Mannuthy is also famous for its nurseries. There are around 1000 nurseries selling multiple potted plants, herbs, saplings and seeds in Mannuthy.

Major banks have their branches in Mannuthy including

- Canara Bank
- ESAF Small Finance Bank
- South Indian Bank
- Bank of Baroda
- Catholic Syrian Bank
- Kerala State Financial Enterprises.

Areas around Mannuthy are Mukkattukara, Nettissery, Madakathara, Vellanikara, Mulayam, Mullakara, Nadathara and Ollukara. Mannuthy is one of the entry point to Thrissur City. Mannuthy is also near to the Peechi Dam.

== See also ==
- List of Thrissur Corporation wards

== Notable peoples ==
- T. G. Ravi, actor
- Rahul KP, Indian Footballer
- Sreejith Ravi, actor
