= Cashew Research Station, Madakkathara =

Research Station in Kerala, India

- കാഷ്യു റിസർച്ച് സ്റ്റേഷൻ, മാടക്കത്തറ
- Established: May 1, 1973; 53 years ago
- Field of research: Cashew
- Location: Madakkathara, Kerala, India; 10.5503°N 76.2658°E
- Operating agency: Kerala Agricultural University
- Website: crsmadakkathara.kau.in
- Location near Madakkathara

Cashew Research Station, Madakkathara is a research Station under the Central Zone of Kerala Agricultural University at Madakkathara in Thrissur district of Kerala, India. This research Station was established in 1973. It is one of the ten centres of All India Coordinated Research Project on Cashew (AICRP on Cashew).

The main function of the centre is research on cashew. Madakkathara, the location of this station, is in the central agro climatic zone of Kerala with lateritic (oxisol) soil. The station is situated at an altitude of 40 Metres above MSL.

This research station established the first ever cashew apple processing unit in India. The processing unit produces five commercial food products from cashew apple such as cashew apple syrup, cashew apple-mango mixed jam (Cashewman Jam), cashew apple candy, cashew apple pickle and cashew apple ready-to-serve. In 2009 a delegation from Senegal in West Africa is underwent training in cashew cultivation and cashew apple processing at the Cashew Research Station.

In 2013, field tests for organic substitutes for Endosulfan conducted at this research station, yielded positive results.

== Cashew cultivars released from this station ==
Progeny	Cultivar	Remarks
BLA 39-4	Madakkathara-1	***
NDR 2-1	Madakkathara-2	***
BLA-139-1 x H 3-13	Kanaka	***
ALGD-1-1 x K 30-1	Dhana	***
BLA-139-1 x K 30-1	Priyanka	***
