= Odakkali =

- town
- Location in Kerala, India Odakkali (India)
- Coordinates: 10.09°N 76.54°E
- Country: India
- State: Kerala
- District: Ernakulam

Languages
  - Official: Malayalam, English
- Time zone: UTC+5:30 (IST)
- Vehicle registration: KL-40

Odakkali, located at 10.09 North and 76.54 Eastis a village in the Perumbavoor Ernakulam district of Kerala State, in southern India. Odakkali is 26.8 km away from Aluva in Aluva Munnar Road.

== Temple ==
The Kallil Temple is 2 km away from Odakkali.

== Research station ==
The Aromatic and Medicinal Plants Research Station of Kerala Agricultural University is located at Odakkali. This research station has attracted international attention in the field of aromatic technology. It has identified sources of rose aroma, which are less expensive and are of great demand in the perfume industry. The Aromatic and Medicinal Plants Research Station was established in 1951 as 'Lemon Grass Breeding Station' under the Department of Agriculture of the erstwhile Travancore- Cochin government. Later, it was brought under the direct administrative control of the Associate Director of Research (Central Region) of the Kerala Agricultural University in 1982 and was renamed the Aromatic and Medicinal Plants Research Station (AMPRS). The United Nations Industrial Development Organization directs entrepreneurs to this centre for advice regarding their research and development needs on lemongrass.

=== Herbs ===
The Research Station has been recognized at the national level as one of the leading centres for research on aromatic plants. Scientists here have identified two herbs rich in geranyl acetate, giving off the smell of rose. They are found in the hills of Munnar and Thathamangalam near Palakkad. OD 468 is the technical name of the plant identified at Munnar and OD 455 of the one at Thathamangalam. 'OD' stands for Odakkali, the place where the Institute is located. Studies have revealed that the average yield of the variety was nearly 10 tonnes of herbage per harvest. Hydro-distillation of the leaf produced 0.4 percent of essential oils and 79.8 percent of geranyl acetate.

=== Lemongrass ===
The most significant contribution of AMPRS is the 'Sugandhi' (OD19), a variety of lemongrass of high yield and quality. It has been nationally accepted as the most significant variety of East Indian lemongrass. Diverse soil and climatic conditions ranging from hot, humid tropics of Kerala to sub-tropical conditions of sub-Himalayan regions have not been unfavourable to its growth. A prized collection of 450 varieties of this species of India and abroad can be found in this Institute. A great deal has been done by the institute for the conservation of aromatic plants. A phytochemical laboratory upgraded to regional Analytical Laboratory for medicinal and aromatic plants has been established. It is sponsored by the Ministry of Agriculture, Government of India.

=== Herbal garden ===
The station has a herbal garden comprising 350 species of medicinal herbs. The garden serves the purpose of providing genuine plant species used in indigenous systems of medicine, conserving and propagating endangered species, educating and demonstrating as well as functioning as a reference centre. The farm also has provision for cultivating around 15 species of medicinal herbs. A nursery centre contains planting parts like seeds of medicinal herbs, which are distributed among cultivators. Demands for these come in from all over the country from Jammu to Kanyakumari to the Bay of Bengal to the Andaman and Nicobar Islands. It is a matter of pride for the Kerala Agricultural University that the station has found a place in the world seeds catalogue of the F.A.O.
