= Thanikkudam =

- Suburb
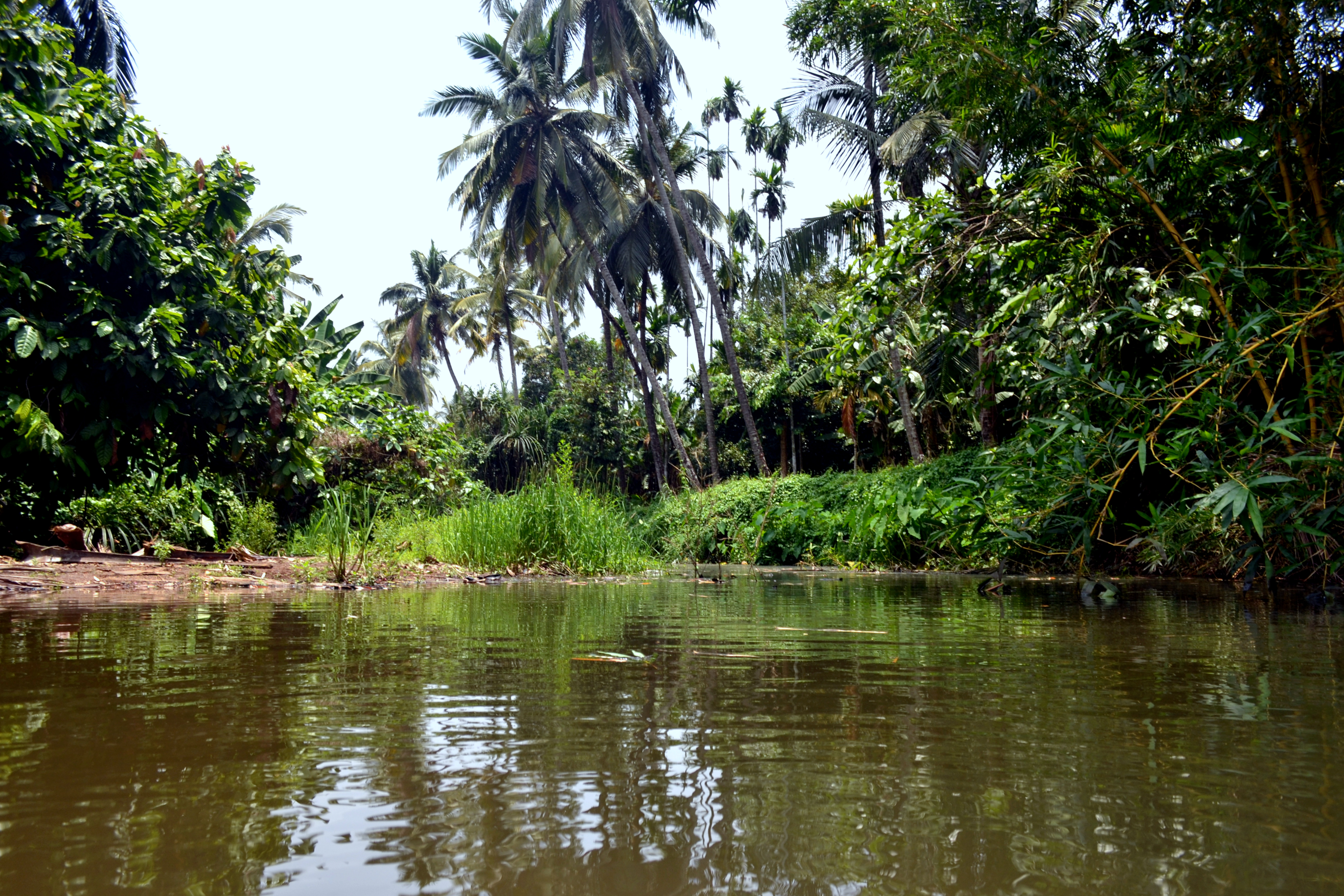
- Thannikkudam river
- Interactive map of Thanikkudam
- Coordinates: 10.5739637°N 76.2595797°E
- Country: India
- State: Kerala
- District: Thrissur District

Languages
  - Official: Malayalam, English
- Time zone: UTC+5:30 (IST)
- PIN: 680 028
- Telephone code: 91 (0)487 69
- Vehicle registration: KL-08
- Distance from Thrissur: 10 kilometres (6.2 mi) North East (Road)
- Distance from Mannuthy: 3 kilometres (1.9 mi) North West (Road)
- Distance from Wadackanchery: 10 kilometres (6.2 mi) South East (Road)

Thanikkudam is a rapidly growing suburb north-east of Thrissur, in the Indian state of Kerala. The village-town is home to the Thanikkudam Bhagavathi Temple which is popularly known across the central part of Kerala. A small river, which has become perennial in recent times stretches through the middle of the village, oriented in a north-east to South-west direction. The area is also wound around by the Right Branch Main Canal (RBMC) of the Peechi hydro-irrigation project system.

== Geography and Landscape ==
The geography and landscape of Thanikkudam is very typical of the middle-land villages of Kerala, and in particular that of Thrissur district. The land has an overall inclination along the North East to South west direction. This significantly affects the hydrology, precipitation, water drainage and wind flows.

The village shares its eastern border at Chenkalli, a hill of heights up to 1000m above sea level with the south-western tips of Vazhani range and north-western slopes of Peechi and Vellani mountains. Except for a few more hillocks such as Meppadam and Thaliyanpara, the land has a generally plain nature with intermediate undulating profiles.

The populated areas have altitudes ranging from 15m to 30m above sea level.

The village has a multitude of soil types such as laterite, clay, alluvial slits and gravel.

== Geography ==
The protected natural forests lining the eastern borders and neighboring high ranges provide for satisfactory precipitation. The drainage is relatively retarded by the natural undulations and mixture of high and low terrains.

The short and narrow Thanikkudam river divides the village into two areas. Beginning from the slopes of Vazhani ranges and Chenkalli, the river has become mostly perennial over the last few decades owing to the change in climate and land use. However, it has important effect on the lifestyle, water use and weather of the place.

== Natural resources ==
The village has been a traditional agrarian source of medicinal plants, honey, firewood and compost made of leaves besides a variety of crops ranging from rice to rubber.

== People ==
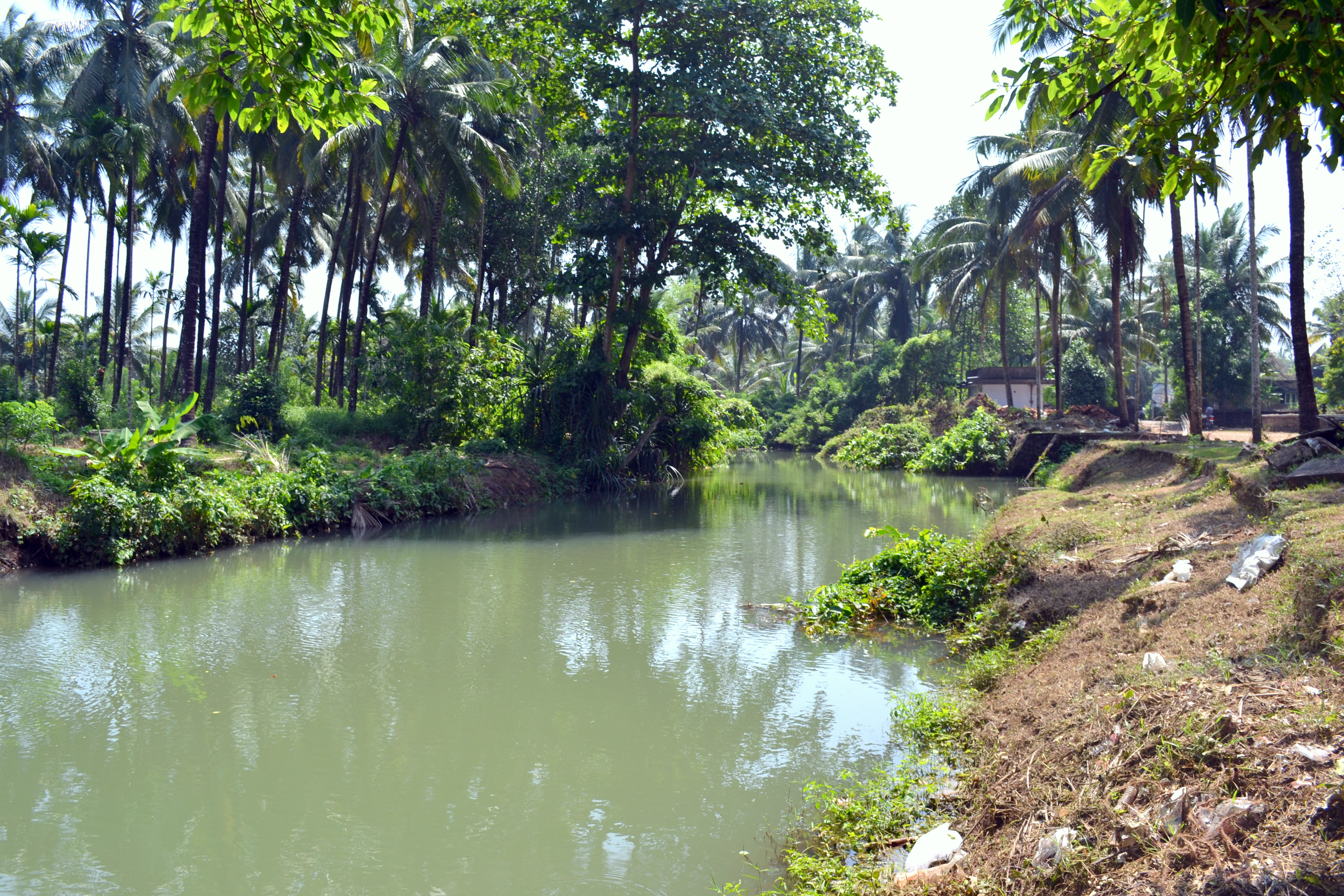
Thannikudam

The population consists of lower and upper class middle class with comparable economic and educational levels of other parts of Kerala. The majority belong to Hindu religion. Up to 5% of the people are Christians. Other religions are insignificantly lower in population. The common language is Malayalam. However, due to a large number of villagers who have been working in the past or at present at remote places (such as middle east or other parts of India), people who can manage English, Hindi, Tamil, Telugu and Arabic can be seen among them.

== Agriculture ==
the forest was cleared in 1940s famine period farming started

== Thanikkudam Temple ==
There is an Upper Primary School, a village Library and several governmental service institutions which serve the village as well as her neighbors. Both the school and library have been in existence since more than 50 years ago and have been effective in raising the educational and social welfare of the inhabitants. Although the area was predominantly agricultural in nature (especially rice, rubber and cashew), the recent trends have reduced and replaced those crops to Banana plantain, horticulture etc. The increasing inrush of more inhabitants has reduced the available land for cultivation. Besides, the water resources are no longer sustainable over an annual period to support full-fledged agriculture.

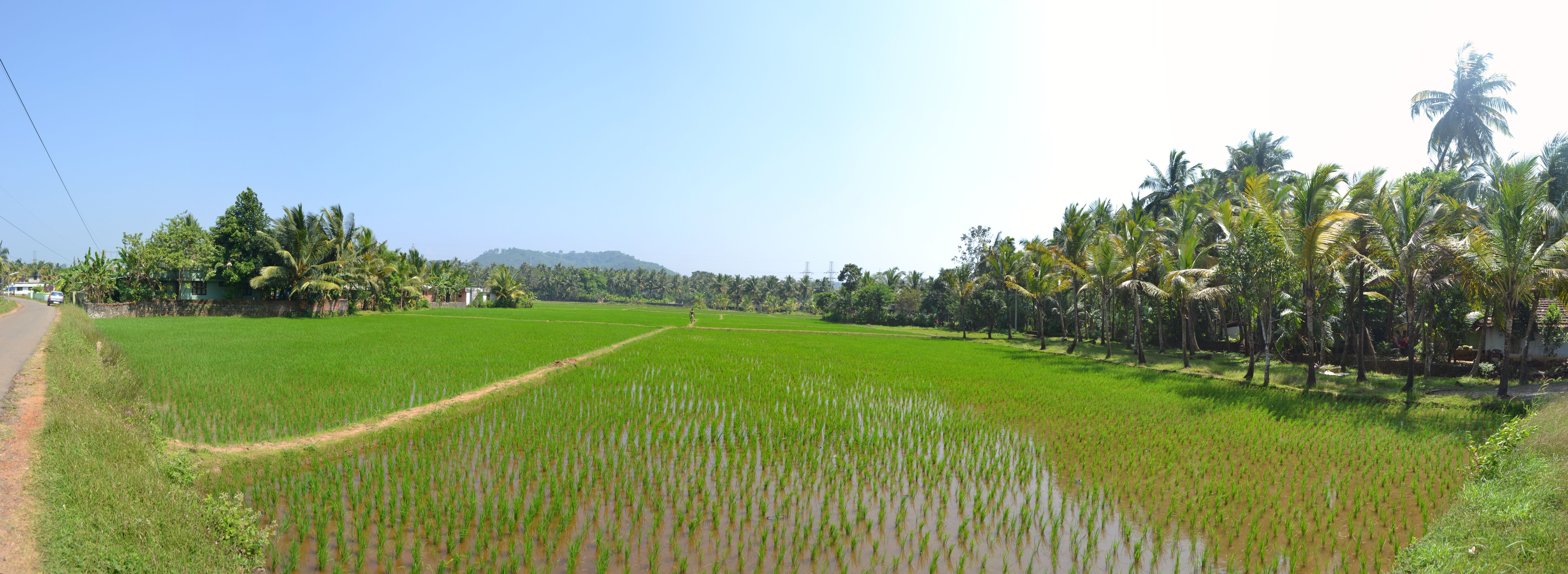
Rice farming - a scene that is gradually vanishing from the suburbs of Thrissur city

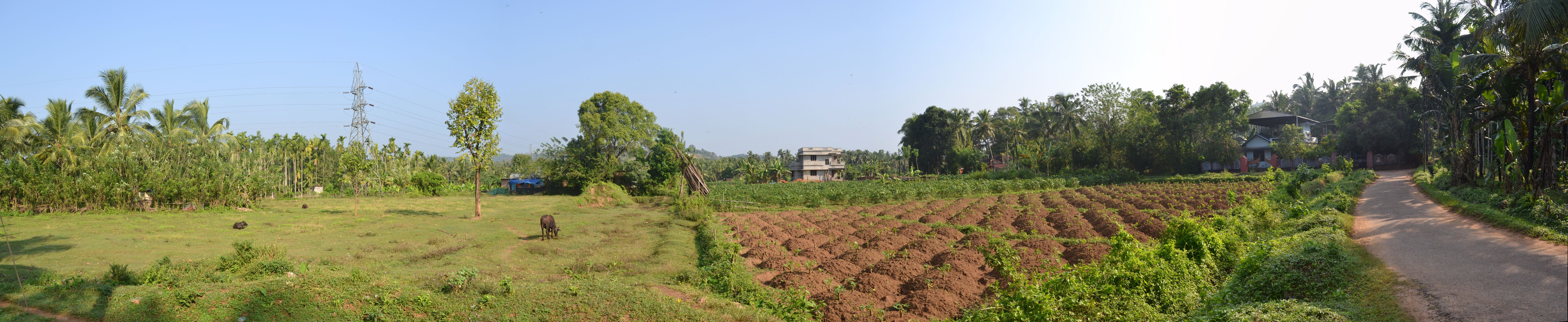
A tiny piece of land where Tapioca(also known as Cassava) is cultivated. A few decades ago, most of such land areas were used as paddy fields. The segmentation of agricultural lands due to social and cultural changes in addition to economic transformations have made rice cultivation less lucrative. The overall productivity of the bulk of the land has come down. However, it may have increased the bio-diversity to some extent.

== External sources ==
- Article about the rain festival in Bhagavathi Temple, Thanikkudam
- Article from The Hindu
