= Monkombu =

- Village
- Location in Kerala, India Monkombu (India)
- Coordinates: 9°26′20″N 76°25′15″E
- Country: India
- State: Kerala
- District: Alappuzha

Languages
  - Official: Malayalam, English
- Time zone: UTC+5:30 (IST)
- PIN: 688502
- Vehicle registration: KL-

Mankombu or Moncombu is a village in the district of Alappuzha in the state of Kerala, India. Monkombu, part of the Kuttanad delta region popularly mentioned as 'Rice bowl of Kerala'; is one of the major paddy cultivation regions of the state.

Its unique geography embodied by Vembanad Lake, inter-linked Pamba River, Manimala River and Achankovil river systems, gives rise to islands, back waters, network of waterways and canals, below sea-level paddy fields and marsh. The farmers here have met the challenges of below sea-level cultivation over two centuries.

Annual festivals, auspicious rites and religious events at Mankombu Bhagavathi Devi temple, St. Pius Church and Pope John Paul Church are occasions for social communion, rejoicing and celebration.

Once a prosperous hamlet of hundreds of households, Mankombu today is ravaged by climate change, pollution and dwindling population.

== Rice Research Station ==
Alleppey-Changanasseri road (AC Road) opened up motor transport connecting hinterland to nearby towns and introduced farm machinery in wetlands, facilitated transport of farm inputs and harvested crop by road and gave boost to the economy. Mankompu is especially known for being home for the Rice Research Station of the Kerala Agricultural University. A unit of All India co-ordinated rice improvement program began here in 1974. It undertakes research and extension work of plant breeding, soil science, crop protection and crop production.Rice varieties UMA, GOURI and JYOTHI developed here is well adapted to agro-climatic conditions of Mankombu. The ancestors of Dr. M. S. Swaminathan, a renowned agricultural scientist, who is a known father of the Indian Green Revolution and the first winner of the World Food Prize, hailed from this village.

== Temples ==
The Moncombu Bhagavathy Temple here is well known in Kerala and devotees pray for family fortune, learning and protection when going on a long journey. It was built during reign of king Veera Marthanda Verma of Travancore. According to one story, a high official of Ambalappuzha Chieftain was transporting logs of wood by river in a big country craft, when three damsels beckoned him from the banks and told they wanted to go to a sacred place. He agreed to let them travel along, provided they became plain-faced, to avoid a scandal. When they transformed themselves into ugly women, he realized they were Avatarams and the party sailed down river. When it reached near present-day of Mankombu, it refused to move further despite huffing-and-puffing of punters. Then the plain-looking women revealed their true Goddess form to the high official and wanted temples to be built for future generations. After this divine revelation they were transformed into idols. For the first Goddess the place chosen was Koyikkal, the second in Vadaiattu. When they were considering where to consecrate the third goddess, she possessed a mendicant among the crowd who picked up a mango log ( Manka in Malayalam) threw it up in the air with all his might and where it fell was declared the holy spot. This place was named Mankombu, meaning "Branch of a mango tree" and temple was built. Descendants of this holyman are custodians of deity and enjoy privilege in the affairs of this temple. This temple was consecrated in the month of Meenam (March April ) in the star of Bharani. The founders day is celebrated during this occasion. The temple is open for daily poojas and attracts thousands during propitious days determined by Malayalam astrology. An annual 7 days festival begins on 14 April every year. This is followed by the Pathamudayam festival on 23 April every year.

== Etymology ==
Since the English name is an approximate transliteration of the Malayalam word, there may be ambiguity in the spelling. Moncombu is the spelling recognized by the Postal Department as well as in government communication. But yet other variants such as Mankombu is in use by the press.

== Eminent Persons ==
- Dr. M.S.Swaminathan - Agriculture Scientist and Father of Green Revolution
- Dr. Soumya Swaminathan- Daughter of Dr. M.S. Swaminathan, Renowned clinical scientist and Pediatrician in the field of TB and HIV research, Former DG ICMR, Former chief scientist at the WHO & Deputy Director General of Programmes (DDP) at WHO
- Late Sri.M.K. Neelakanta Iyer - Chief Secretary of Travancore State and Devaswom Commissioner and Sanskrit scholar
- Dr.K.V.Krishna Das - Retired Professor Medical College & Hospital Trivandrum, Author of Medical Textbooks, Farmer & philanthropist
- Late Dr.K.K.Haridas - Founder, Department of Cardiology, Amritha Institute of Medical Sciences
- Late Prof. P.S.Mani Iyer - Professor of Electrical Engineering, College of Military Engineering, Pune. President Awardee.
- Dr.N.N.Panickar - Expert in Ocean Engineering, philanthropist and co-coordinator of Nattukkuttam advocacy https://en.m.wikipedia.org/wiki/K._P._Sasidharan
- Late Prof. K. P. Sasidharan - Eminent Malayalam writer, Professor of English literature
- Sri. Beeyar Prasad - Poet, film lyricist, novelist and TV personality
- Late Sri. M.K.Ananthasiva Iyer - Founder of ATGVHSS Moncombu, Government Pleader, philanthropist
- Sri. Moncombu Gopalakrishnan - Poet, film lyricist and script writer
- Prof. K P. Mohandas - Retired Professor NIT Kozhikode, author and social media campaigner
- M.R.Narayanan - Expert in floating structures and solar energy
- Dr.Madhu Kumar - Former Registrar University of Kerala
- Late Prof.Parameswaran - Professor of Zoology, SD College Alleppey

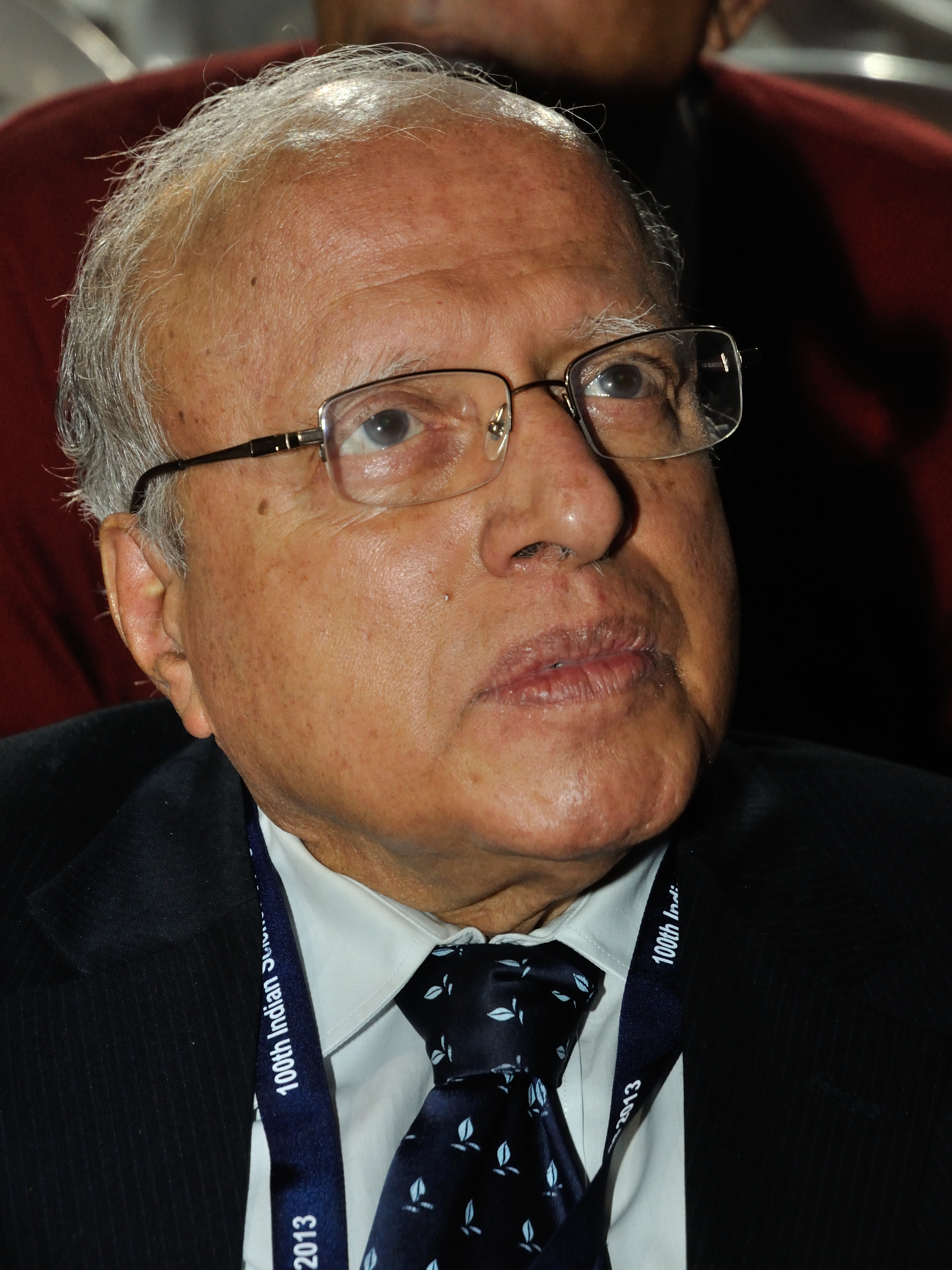
Mankompu Sambasivan Swaminathan, Scientist
