= Agricultural Research Station, Anakkayam =

Research Station in Kerala, India

Coordinates: 11.090°N 76.120°E

Agricultural Research Station, Anakkayam is a research Station under the Central Zone of Kerala Agricultural University at Anakkayam in Malappuram district of Kerala, India. It was established in 1963 as a cashew research station and has an area of 9.92 ha under it. ARS Anakkayam maintains 216 hybrids of 18 parental combinations. Anakkayam - 1, Dharasree and Mrudula are the three cashew cultivars released for cultivation from this station.

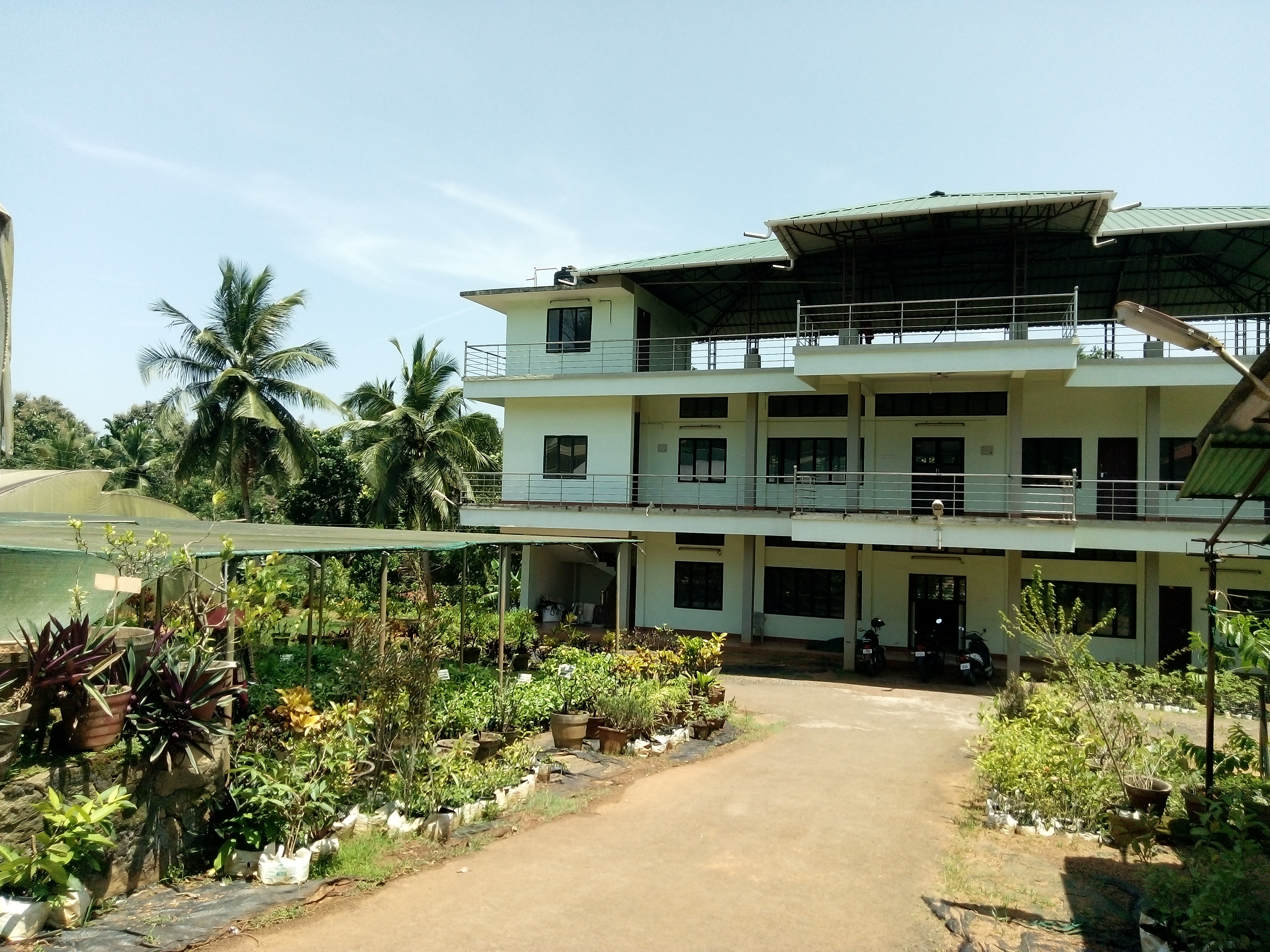

The station will get more opportunities to conduct research programmes once it gets the Centre of Excellence status from The Government of Kerala.

A delegation led by Dubai's agriculture minister visited the station in 2012.
