= K. P. Sasidharan =

Indian scholar, professor and novelist

KP Sasidharan
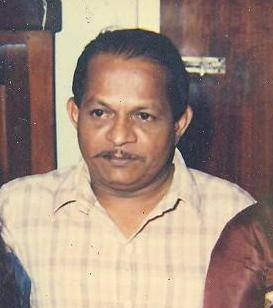
- Born: 10 June 1938; Thekkekara, Kerala
- Died: 17 June 2015 (aged 77); Ernakulam, Kerala

K. P. Sasidharan (10 June 1938 – 17 June 2015) was a professor of English literature, critic, creative writer and translator in Malayalam. He was a winner of the Soviet Land Nehru Award and the Kerala Sangeetha Nataka Akademi Award. He was equally proficient in English and Malayalam literature. His contributions to Malayalam literature include several novels, short stories, studies, and translations from English to Malayalam.

== Education ==
His schooling was in Monkombu, Kerala's Alappuzha district, where he studied at the Avittam Thirunal High School (1952–55), following which he studied at the Sanatana Dharma College, located in Alappuzha between 1955 and 1957 to complete his Intermediate. He completed his B A (Hons) degree in English Language and Literature (1957–60) at the University College Thiruvananthapuram. He obtained a Doctorate in the year 1991 (Doctor of Philosophy) from the University of Calicut.

== Professional career ==
He began his career as a Lecturer in English at St. Thomas College, Kozhencherry in the year 1960. In the following year, he moved to the Government Victoria College, Palakkad, where he continued to work until 1971. In the year 1971, he became the Professor and Head of the English Department at Maharaja's College, Ernakulam, where he continued in that position until 1990. He took over as the Principal of the Government College, Manimalakkunnu, located in Koothattukulam in the year 1991. He remained there until he moved to the Kerala Bhasha Institute, a State Government academic publishing house as its Director (1992–93).

== Books published ==
- Anthassulla Manushyar (Novel) Mangalodayam Thrissur, 1966.
- Uppu (Novel) Sahithya Pravarthaka Coop Society, Kottayam, 1968.
- Udikkunnu Asthamikkunnu (Short stories) SPCS, Kottayam, 1968.
- Vedanthikkas (Satire - Serialised in Mathrubhumy weekly) Poorna publication, kozhikode, 1970.
- Darling (Collection of short stories) SPCS, Kottayam, 1970.
- Aanakompum Kurangukalum (Short stories) D C Books Kottayam, 1978.
- Kalaghattathinte Sabdangal (Study) Current Books, 1978.
- Jude the Obscure (Translation) SPCS, National Book Stall, Kottayam, 1979.
- Rushyan Sahithyan Enthu Enthukontu (Study on Russian literature) Prabhath printers, Thiruvananthapuram, 1981.
- Krishna Studies (English) McMillan Books, New Delhi, 1982.
- Kavithayute Saaphalyam (Study) Mangala printing press, 1982.
- Kavithayute Moonu Vazhikal (Study) Book Club, 1983.
- Maranamillatha Vayalar (Study) India press kottayam, 1984.
- Lenin Piranna Mannil (Travelogue) Prabhath book house, Thiruvananthapuram, 1985.
- KesavaDev- Makers of Indian Literature Series (Study) Kerala Sahithya Academy 1985.
- Poets in a changing world (Study (English)) Konark Publishers, New Delhi, 1991.
- Karikkattayil Ila Virinju (Children’s literature) State Institute of Languages, Kerala, 1998.
- Julius Caesar (Translation) D C Books, 2000.
- Henry V (Translation) D C Books, 2000.
- The Merry Wives of Windsor (Translation) D C Books, 2000.
- Troilus and Cressida (Translation) D C Books, 2000.
- Cymbeline (Translation) D C Books, 2000.
- Richard III (Translation) D C Books, 2000.
- All’s well that ends well (Translation) D C Books, 2000.
- Lesson in Love (Translation) D C Books, 2000.
- Alcestis (Translation) Mangala Publishers, 2000.
- War and Peace (Translation) Chintha Publications. Thiruvananthapuram, 2010.
- Crime and Punishment (Translation) Chintha Publishers, Thiruvananthapuram, 2010.
- The Hunchback of Notre Dame (Translation) Chintha Publishers, Thiruvananthapuram, 2010.

== References (links) ==
1. http://www.sbcollege.org/library/authcat.php?idauth=Sasidharan, K%20P

2. https://www.amazon.com/Julius-Ceasar-K-P-Sasidharan-William-Shakespere/dp/B007E5F7DY

3. https://www.amazon.in/Yudhavum-Samadhanavum-Leo-Tolstoy/dp/9383155434/ref=sr_1_2?s=books&ie=UTF8&qid=1452241958&sr=1-2

4. http://www.indulekha.com/kuttavum-sikshayum-novel-dostoyevsky-chintha

5. http://www.maebag.com/OldVer/Product/18483/Malayalam_novel_Notredamile_Koonan__Victo_Hugo,_K_P_Sasidharan

6. https://www.amazon.com/Julius-Ceasar-William-Shakespere-K-P-Sasidharan/dp/B007E5F7DY/ref=sr_1_3?s=books&ie=UTF8&qid=1454335730&sr=1-3&refinements=p_n_feature_nine_browse-bin%3A3291506011
