= Aromatic and Medicinal Plants Research Station, Odakkali =

Research station in Kerala, India

- അരോമാറ്റിക് ആൻഡ് മെഡിസിനൽ പ്ലാന്റ് റിസർച്ച് സ്റ്റേഷൻ, ഓടക്കാലി
- Former name: Lemongrass Breeding Station
- Established: March 15, 1951; 75 years ago
- Field of research: Aromatic and medicinal plants
- Location: Asamannoor P.O., Ernakulam District, Odakkali, Kerala, 683549, India; 10°5′50″N 76°32′45″E
- Operating agency: Kerala Agricultural University
- Website: amprs.kau.in
- Map

Aromatic and Medicinal Plants Research Station, Odakkali is a research Station under the Central Zone of Kerala Agricultural University at Odakkali in Ernakulam district of Kerala, India. This station was established in 1951 as Lemongrass Breeding Station by the Travancore-Cochin Government. Later in 1972 after the formation of Kerala Agricultural University the research station was brought under the control of KAU. The station was renamed as Aromatic and Medicinal Plants Research Station (AMPRS) in 1982.

In 1994, Ministry of Agriculture, of India upgraded the phytochemical laboratory of this station as one of the Regional Analytical Laboratories for medicinal and aromatic plants.

In 2008, some augmented facilities were inaugurated as a step in the research station’s bid to acquire the status of a centre of excellence in aromatic and medicinal plants in the country.
