= Agronomic Research Station, Chalakudy =

Research station in Chalakudy, India

Coordinates: 10.313°N 76.342°E

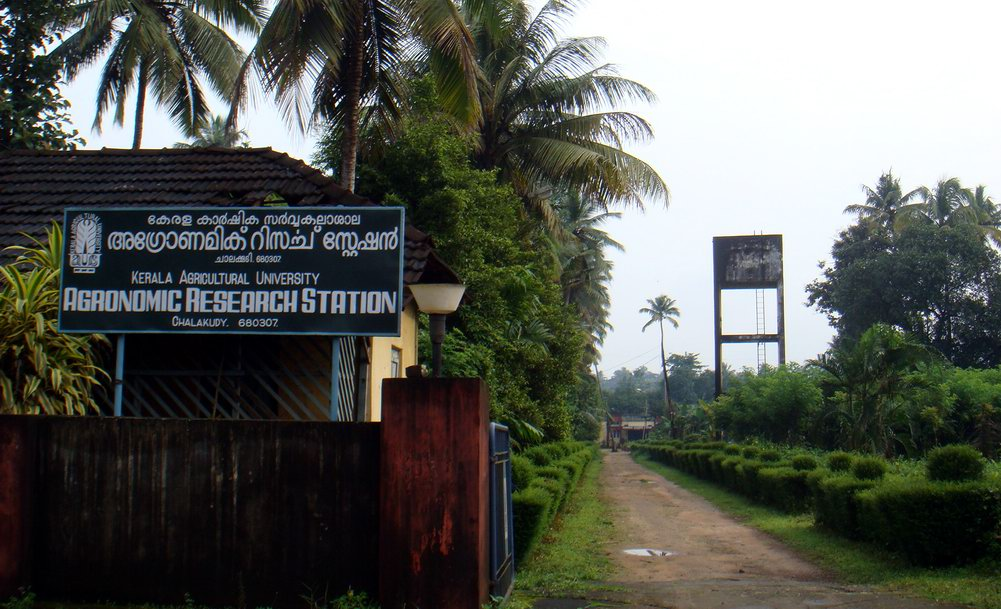
Agronomic Research Station in Chalakudy

Agronomic Research Station, Chalakudy is a research Station under the Central Zone of Kerala Agricultural University at Chalakudy in Thrissur district of Kerala, India.

This research Station was established in 1972 by the Agricultural Department of Kerala. When Kerala Agricultural University was established in 1972, Agronomic Research Station was taken over by KAU. The station was taken over for implementing the Co-ordinated project for research on water management sponsored by ICAR. The water management research scheme started functioning from 1974. This research station is conducting active research in organic fertigation.
