= Banana Research Station, Kannara =

Research institute in Kerala, India

- ബനാന റിസർച്ച് സ്റ്റേഷൻ, കണ്ണറ
- Established: 1963
- Field of research: Banana and banana-based cropping systems
- Location: Kannara, Kerala, 680652, India; 10.5378°N 76.3199°E
- Operating agency: Kerala Agricultural University
- Website: brskannara.kau.in
- Location near Kannara

Banana Research Station, Kannara is a research Station under the Central Zone of Kerala Agricultural University at Kannara in Thrissur district of Kerala, India.

This research station was established in 1963 to carry out research on bananas and pineapples. The station was brought under the All India Co-ordinated Fruit Improvement Project of the ICAR in 1970.

When Kerala Agricultural University was established in 1972, Banana Research Station, Kannara was taken over by KAU. This station successfully developed tissue culture banana farming in 2011.
