= College of Agriculture, Vellanikkara =

College of Kerala Agricultural University

- കാർഷിക കോളേജ് വെള്ളാനിക്കര
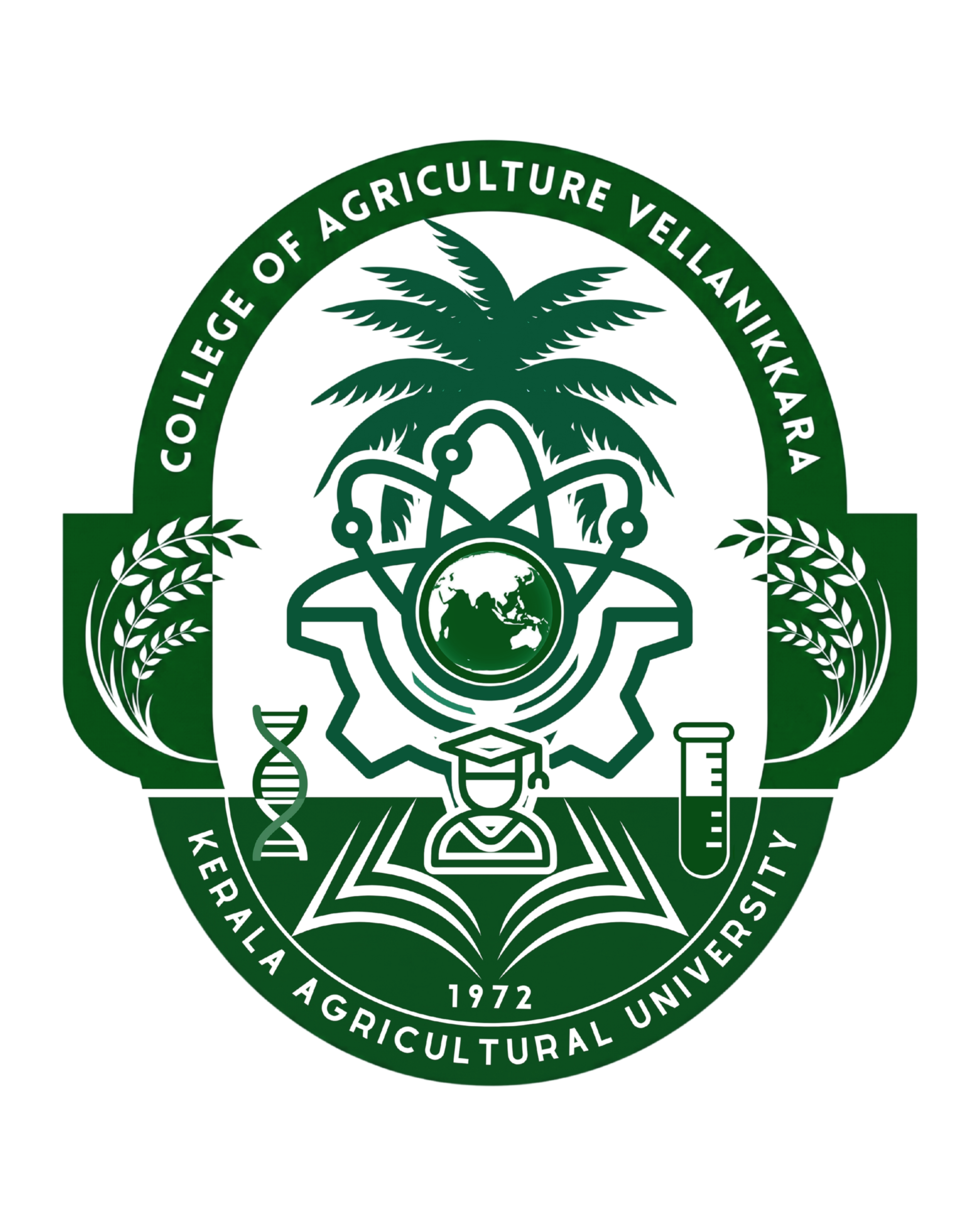
- Other name: CoA Vellanikkara
- Former name: College of Horticulture Vellanikkara (CoH) (1972-2020)
- Type: Education, Research and Extension institution
- Established: 1972
- Parent institution: Kerala Agricultural University
- Accreditation: Indian Council of Agricultural Research
- Academic affiliations: Kerala Agricultural University
- Officer in charge: Dean
- Chancellor: Shri. Rajendra Vishwanath Arlekar
- Vice-Chancellor: Prof. (Dr.) Sajitha Rani T
- Dean: Prof. (Dr.). K. Surendra Gopal
- Location: Kerala Agricultural University Main campus, KAU P.O., Thrissur, Keralam, 680 656, India
- Campus: 1,000 acres (400 ha); Rural
- Language: English
- Label: HORTICOS
- Website: cohvka.kau.in

The College of Agriculture Vellanikkara, is the main campus and the premier college of Kerala Agricultural University, situated in Thrissur district of Keralam in India. The College of Agriculture imparts agricultural education at undergraduate, graduate and doctoral levels. The college has 22 departments, 11 All India Coordinated Research Projects and 11 centres undertaking the multiple activities of teaching, research and extension. The college is located in the picturesque of Kerala Agricultural University where the college and its departments itself spans the central campus in Vellanikkara, Thrissur. The college received Sardar Patel Outstanding Institution Award more than 10 times consecutively which is awarded by the Indian Council of Agricultural Research, for the institution's efficiency in contributing most number of Top ranks in JRF and SRF All India Entrance Examinations. The IPR cell under this college plays a pivotal role in establishing and promoting the Intellectual rights for products and services of the state and has secured the recognition of being the India's leading government institute for bagging most Geographical Indication tags. Agri Business Incubator functioning under the college is one of the prosperous and promising avenue for rising entrepreneurs of the state. The college was the first and the most to be awarded 'The Best College Award' by Kerala Agricultural University. College of Agriculture Vellanikkara is the only college under the university to win the intercollegiate Golden Lady Arts Trophy consecutively for a decade and more (11 titles until 2025). Prof. (Dr.). K. Surendra GopaL is the current dean of the college

== History ==
The College of Horticulture was established in 1972 with the main objective of starting graduate programme in Horticulture and strengthening research and extension activities in Horticultural crops. B.Sc. (Hort.) degree programme was started with an intake of 20 students during 1972. The intake capacity was increased to 30 from 1976 and then to 40 from 1979. The B.Sc.(Ag.) programme was also introduced from 1977 with an intake of 50 students. The syllabi for the B.Sc. (Hort.) and B.Sc. (Ag.) programme were then integrated and the B.Sc. (Ag) programme alone was continued with the integrated syllabus. The intake capacity for the B.Sc. (Ag.) programme was subsequently raised to 75 and then to 90. Post graduate programme was started in six disciplines from 1976 viz., M.Sc. (Hort.), M.Sc. (Ag.) in Agronomy, Agricultural Botany, Soil Science & Agrl. Chemistry, Agrl. Entomology and Plant Pathology.

From 1979, Ph.D. programmes in the above disciplines were commenced. Subsequently, M.Sc. programmes were also started in Agrl. Economics, Agrl. Extension, Agrl. Meteorology, Agrl. Statistics and Home Science (Food Science and Nutrition). Two post-graduate diploma courses of one-year duration were conducted in Natural Rubber Production and Land Water Resources and Management from 1979 and 1980 respectively and subsequently discontinued. Under the Manpower Development Scheme sponsored by the Coffee Board of India, the final year B.Sc. (Ag.) students were given special training in coffee cultivation and processing from 1984 to 1997.

A new diploma course of two-year duration in Natural Rubber Production was started in 1998 for the sponsored candidates from Tripura with the financial assistance of the Rubber Board, Kottayam. The required Infrastructure for imparting practical training has been established. In addition to the Instructional Farm having an area of 95.35 ha, the different departments have established farms of their own in a total area of about 72.24 ha. Most of the tropical annual, perennial and plantation crops are grown in these farms. The undergraduates are given training in the cultivation of various annual crops, maintenance of perennial crops and processing of agricultural and horticultural produces through various work experience courses.

Crop production (Tapioca), Department of Agronomy, CoA Vellanikkara

In addition to the regular field trips to various places within the state as part of practical training, the students of the second and third year B.Sc. (Ag) classes are taken on study tour to places of agricultural importance all over South India and all over the country, respectively. During the eighth semester, the final year students are attached to Krishi Bhavans and Agricultural Research Stations of the state for specific periods as a part of their field Training Programme (RAWE). The Dean heads the college. The faculty consists of nearly 130 highly qualified teachers specialised in various branches of agricultural sciences.

The name College of Horticulture Vellanikkara was renamed to College of Agriculture Vellanikkara in 2020 through ICAR recommendation followed by the Kerala Agricultural University academic council decision. Present intake of Bsc. (Hons.) Agriculture programme is 100+9(EWS).

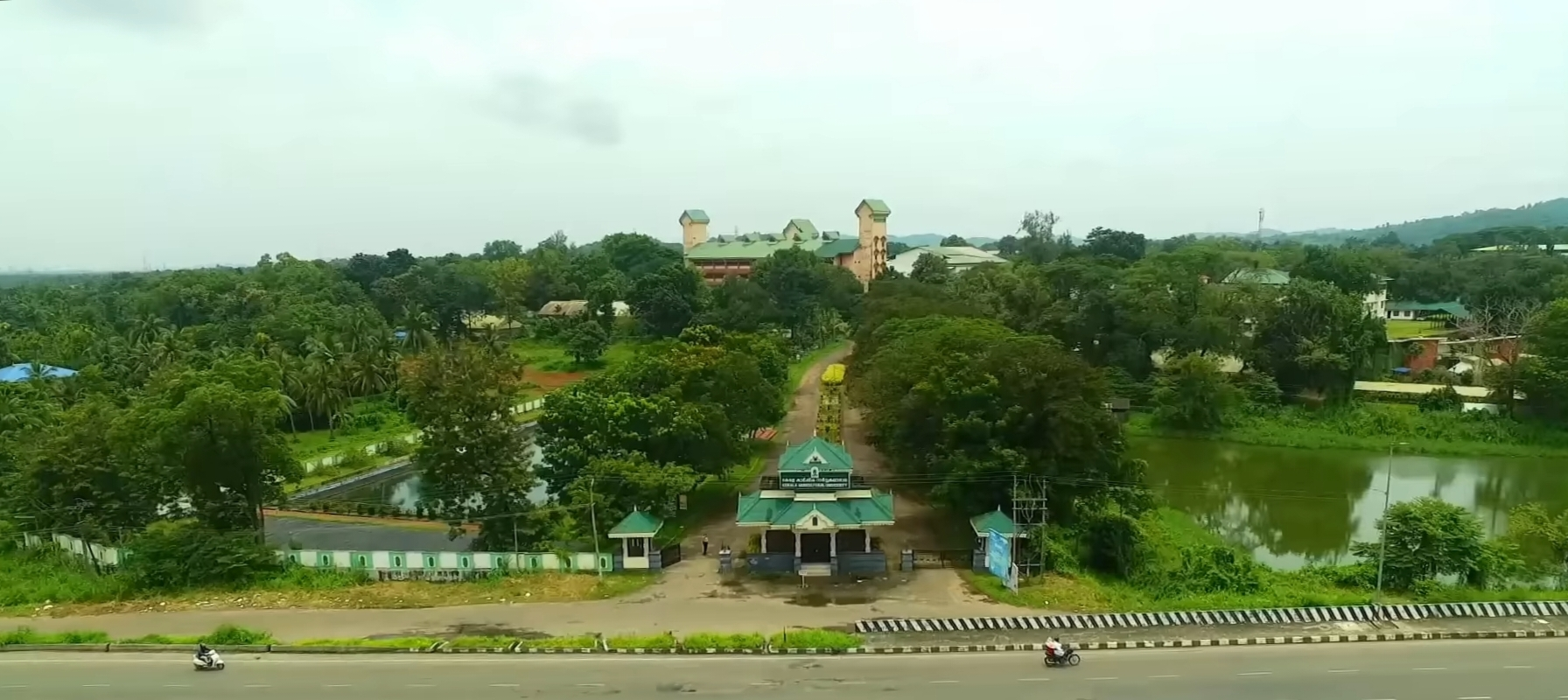

== Departments ==
1. Department of Agronomy
2. Department of Agricultural Meteorology
3. Department of Soil Science and Agricultural Chemistry
4. Department of Agricultural Microbiology
5. Department of Plant Breeding & Genetics
6. Department of Agricultural Entomology
7. Department of Plant Pathology
8. Department of Agricultural Economics
9. Department of Agricultural Extension
10. Department of Agricultural Statistics
11. Department of Fruit Science
12. Department of Vegetable Science
13. Department of Plantation, spices, medicinal and aromatic crops.
14. Department of Post Harvest and Processing Technology
15. Department of Seed science and Technology
16. Department of Agricultural Engineering
17. Department of Community Science
18. Department of Physical Education
19. Department of Floriculture and Landscape architecture
20. Department of Plant Physiology
21. Department of Biotechnology
22. Department of Nano Science and Technology

== Hostels of the college ==
Pampa men's hostel CoA, Vellanikkara, mess hall

1. Pampa Men's Hostel
2. Scholar's Hostel
3. Harsha Ladies Hostel
4. Haritha Ladies Hostel
5. Hrithika Ladies Hostel
6. Hridhya Scholar's Hostel
7. Pampa Ladies Hostel

== Associated Centres ==
- Agri Business Incubator (ABI)
- Pesticide Residue Testing Laboratory
- Center for Gender itudiescin Agriculture and Farm Entrepreneurship Development
- ntre of Intellectual Property Rights (IPR)
- Center for Plant Biotechnology & Molecular Biology
- Center for e-learning
- Center for Land Resources Management
- Radio Tracer Lab
- Cadbury-KAU Cocoa Project
- Center for Bioinformatics
- Instructional Farm
- Agricultural Technology Information Centre
- Model Nursery on Spices (4 star accredited)
- Principle Agro-met Observatory (Class A ranked)
- Seed Grading and Processing Unit
- Ornithology & Apiculture division
- Acarology division
- Dr. T V Vishwanathan Memorial Herbal Garden

== Auditoriums/Halls/Council rooms ==
- Central Auditorium (A/C)
- Uthara Auditorium (Block III)
- Dakshina Auditorium Part A (Block II)
- Dakshina Auditorium Part B (Block II)
- Dwani Open Air Auditorium (Adjacent-Floriculture Field Lab)
- Golden Jubilee Hall (A/C) (Block III)
- Council Room (A/C) (Block II)
- Agri- DIKSHA virtual conference hall (A/C) (Block I) (Dept. of Agrl. Extension)
- Seminar Hall (A/C) (Block II)
- Seminar Hall (A/C) (Central library)
- Ootupura Hall (Stage cum dining)
- Quadrangle Open stage (Interblock II&III)
- Borlaug Mandapam (Interblock II&III)

== Other Facilities ==
Students computer centre, CoA, Vellanikkara, Thrissur

- Students Fitness centre and Wellness pavilion
- Students' Computer Centre with High-speed connectivity
- Language Laboratory
- College Union Office room cum Cultural centre
- Library & Digital Library
- Photostat and binding facility station
- Salkara College Store
- Salkara College Canteen
- Horti's Ahaara College Canteen
- Badminton Court
- Basketball Courts
- Football stadium
- Volleyball Courts
- Butterfly Garden
- Umbrella & Central courtyard
- VIP Lounge
- Visitor's Lounge
- NAHEP Ladies rest room (Block I)
- Ladies Restroom (Block III)

College of Agriculture Vellanikkara, Protective structures
