= Rice Research Station, Moncombu =

Indian research institute

M.S. Swaminathan Rice Research Station, Moncompu
- Established: 1940
- Field of research: Rice cultivation in Kuttanad
- Location: Moncompu, Kerala, 688503, India; 9.4371°N 76.4279°E
- Operating agency: Kerala Agricultural University
- Website: rrsmoncompu.kau.in
- Location in Moncompu

Rice Research Station, Moncombu, is a research Station under the Special Zone of Problem Areas of Kerala Agricultural University at Moncombu in Alappuzha district of Kerala, India.

In 2013, The Centre for Rice Germplasm of this Rice Research Station, has developed new rice varieties with reduced harvesting cycle and increased pest and disease resistance to fight climate change.
