= Regional Agricultural Research Station, Pattambi =

Research station in Kerala, India

Regional Agricultural Research Station, Pattambi (RARS Pattambi) is a research Station under the Central Zone of Kerala Agricultural University at Pattambi in Palakkad district of Kerala, India.

This research station was established in 1927. Later in 1930 it was renamed as Agricultural Research Station and later in 1962 it was renamed as Central Rice Research Station. Kerala Agricultural University took over this Station in 1971. The station was upgraded to the status of RARS in 1981 and made the headquarters of the Central Zone of Kerala Agricultural University.

At a meeting held at the station premises in 2013, The Zonal Research Extension Advisory Committee (ZREAC) of the Central Zone of KAU recommended adoption of several new varieties of crops and promotion of integrated packages for management of pests, diseases and weeds.

Around 54 high yielding rice varieties were developed at this station.

== Varieties of rice developed by RARS Pattambi ==
Name	Year	Remarks
Ptb 35 - Annapoorna	****	The first short duration high yielding variety of India
Ptb 39 - Jyothi	1974	Ptb-10 x IR-8 (HS)
Ptb 40 - Sabari	1974	IR8/2 x Annapoorna (HS)
Ptb 41 - Bharathy	1974	Ptb 10 x IR-8 (HS)
Ptb 42 - Suvarnamodan	1976	ARC-11775 (S )
Ptb 43 - Swarnaprabha	1985	Bhavani x Triveni (HS)
Ptb 44 - Reshmi	1985	Oorpandy (Mutation)
Ptb 45 - Matta Triveni	1990	Reselection from Triveni
Ptb 46 - Jayathi	1990	IR 2061 x Triveni (HS)
Ptb 47 - Neeraja	1990	IR 20 x IR 5 (HS)
Ptb 48 - Nila	1992	(Triveni x Vellathil Kolappala) x Co-25
Ptb 49 - Kairali	1993	IR 36 x Jyothi (HS)
Ptb 50 - Kanchana	1993	IR 36 x Pavizham (HS)

== Major Programmes of the Station ==
85 ongoing research projects/experiments are there in the station. The major programmes are :-

- All India Co-ordinated Rice Improvement Project (AICRIP)
- All India Co-ordinated Research Project on Arid Legumes (AICRP on AL)
- AICRP on Long Term Fertilizer Experiments (AICRP on LTFE)
- University Research Projects (Non Plan, NARP Non Plan & Plan)
- ICAR Adhoc Scheme on Development of superior hybrid rice varieties.
- ICAR funded project on Technology Assessment and Refinement through Institution Village Linkage programme (TAR IVLP)
- National Seed Production – Breeder Seed production Programme (NSP – BSP)
- Research Components of National Watershed Development Programme for Rainfed area (NWDPRA)
- Intensive Vegetable Production (IVP) Programme

== Current Activities ==
Rice Research

- Conservation and characterisation of germplasm
- Breeding for yield improvement and consumer acceptability
- Resistance breeding
- Development of hybrid rice
- Research on yield maximisation under different situations
- Nutrient management & weed control studies
- Research on summer rice fallow utilisation
- Long Term fertilizer Experiments
- Screening of cultures for pest and disease resistance
- Evaluation of new insecticides and fungicides
- Research on sex pheromone for pest management
- Studies on botanicals for control of disease and pests

Research on Pulses:

- Conservation of germplasm of major pulse crops
- Developing short duration drought tolerant cowpea varieties
- Evolving photo insensitive horsegram varieties for rice fallows
- Developing red gram varieties for homesteads

Research on Vegetables

- Mosaic resistance breeding in Chilli
- Identification of Chinese potato types for the region
- Developing mosaic tolerant ashgourd
- Research on bio-fertilisers in vegetables

== Major Units ==
- Farm Unit
- Agromet Unit
- Information and Sales Counter
- Research Workshop
- Rice Museum
- Dairy Unit
- State Seed Testing Laboratory
- Regional Horticultural Nursery
- Regional Instrumentation Laboratory
- Computer Centre & ARIS Cell
- Station Library

== Disciplines & Divisions ==
=== Crop Improvement ===
- Division of Plant Breeding & Genetics
- Division of Pulses
- Division of Horticulture

=== Crop Management ===
- Division of agronomy
- Division of Soil Science
- Division of Agricultural Engineering

=== Plant Protection ===
- Division of Entomology
- Division of Plant Pathology

=== Social Sciences ===
- Division of Agricultural Extension
- Division of Agricultural Statistics
- Division of Agricultural Economics

== Land Resources ==
- Low lands : 19.64 Ha
- Palliyals : 11.99 Ha
- Garden lands : 13.34 Ha
- Total Area : 44.97 Ha
