= Kallil Temple =

Temple in Kerala, India

Coordinates: 10°03′50″N 76°32′44″E

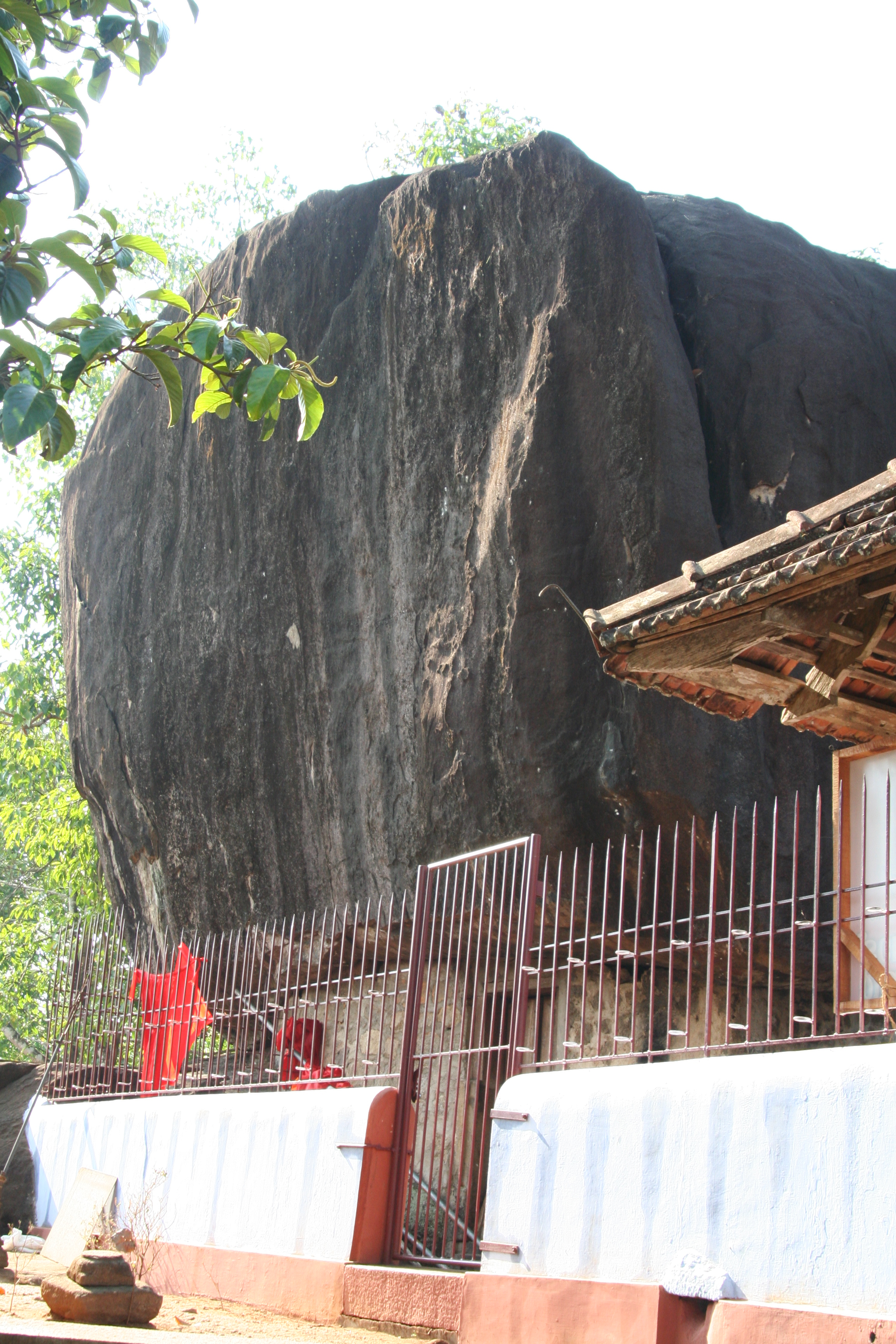
- Kallil temple

Religion
- Affiliation: Hindu
- District: Ernakulam
- Region: South India

Location
- State: Kerala
- Country: India
- Interactive map of Kallil Temple

Architecture
- Completed: 9th-century AD

Kallil Temple is a Hindu–Jain temple located at Kerala, South India. It is 8 km away from Perumbavoor in Ernakulam district of Kerala. The name Kallil in Malayalam means 'in stone'. It is one of the most ancient Hindu temples in Kerala. It is one of the protected monuments in Kerala under Kerala State Department of Archaeology.

The temple, located in a 28-acre (113,000 m^{2}) plot, is cut from a huge rock, and a climb of 69 steps leads to the temple. To reach the temple one has to travel a distance of about 2 km from Odakkali on the Aluva Munnar Road and 10 km from Perumbavoor. The temple is owned by the Kallil Pisharody family. The present Karanavar of the family turned over all the administrative control of the temple and all its belongings to 'Chenkottukonam Sree Ramadasashramam' but regained control due to some hassle between local people and Ashram authorities.

== Location ==
The temple is located at Methala near Perumbavoor in Ernakulam district. The temple is located at a distance of 10 km from Perumbavoor. It is located at a distance of 4 km from Odakali between Perumbavoor and Kothamangalam.

== Kallil Bhagavathi Temple ==
Perumbavoor is famous for its stone Kallil Bhagavathi Temple, which can be reached by crossing over a hundred steps in the jungle. The temple is said to be over five thousand years old and is marked by Perumbavoor on the temple map. It is now preserved as a protected monument under the Archaeological Department.

== Legend ==
It is believed that Kallil Temple this was a Jain temple in the early days and that the goddess Padmāvatī is worshiped here as Bhagwati. The Jain temple later became the Bhagwati temple in the ninth century. The legend spread here is related to a woman. Once upon a time, people came to the forest and saw a woman of extraordinary beauty. They disappeared when he went to see them playing with stones. They hide in the cave with the stones they were playing with. It is believed that the goddess was Bhagwati. It is believed that the stone that went up while the goddess was playing became the roof of the temple and came down as a seat.The stones that were worshiped by the Goddess are still here today ... The huge rock that stands on the roof of the shrine does not touch the ground. This rock that stands tall in the air does not move even if 15 elephants pull it together.

The two most important vows here are the stone vow and the broom vow. The broom vows are made for women to grow hair and for men to change family troubles. The broom vow is made of wool without touching the iron and offered to the temple.

The stone vows to complete the housework that was stopped halfway. If you bring two or three stones from the house where the work is being done and bring them to the temple for prayers, the work will be completed within a year. People who can do whatever they want come here and give thanks again and make vows and pray.

== Cave Temple ==
This temple is also known as the Kallil Cave Temple. The Goddess is enshrined in a cave made of stone. As it is a cave temple, it is not possible to walk around behind the shrine like in normal temples. Therefore, when circling Bhagwati, the circumambulation is completed by bowing to the stone. There is ample evidence that this was a Jain temple in the early days. The idols of Pārśvanātha and Mahavira in Jainism have become idols of Lord Shiva and Lord Vishnu.

== Pooja time ==
The festival is celebrated on the Karthika day in the month of Scorpio. The festival lasts for eight days.

Until 2021, it was customary to walk after noon pooja.

This was due to the difficulty of returning so far for evening poojas. But now even though the walk is closed for noon pooja, the walk is reopened for evening devotional and Athazha pooja.

== Main deity ==
Rock-carved images of the 23rd Tirthankara, Parshvanatha, Vardhaman Mahavira (24th Tirthankara) and Padmavati devi are present in the temple. Padmavati devi is worshipped as Bhagawathi by the local population. The major festival of the temple is celebrated from Karthika of the month Vrishchika and usually lasts for a week.

== See also ==
- Jainism in Kerala
- List of Jain temples
