= Thanikkudam Bhagavathi Temple =

Hindu Temple in Thrissur, Kerala

- Bhagavathy Temple, Thanikkudam, Thrissur, Kerala

Religion
- Affiliation: Hinduism
- District: Thrissur
- Deity: Kali
- Festival: Thiru Aarattu

Location
- Location: Thanikkudam, City of Thrissur
- State: Kerala
- Country: India
- Coordinates: 10.573977°N 76.259747°E

Architecture
- Type: Architecture of Kerala

Specifications
- Temple: One
- Elevation: 37.34 m (123 ft)

Thanikkudam Bhagavathi Temple is a Hindu Temple located in Thanikkudam of Thrissur city in Kerala, on the banks of Puzhakkal River, also called Thanikkudam river. It is dedicated to Goddess Bhadrakali, in the form of 'Nanadurga'. It is famous for 'arattu' ceremony during monsoon season, when the river is flooded and enters the main sanctum, thus submerging the whole idol. This temples is one of the rare temples with such a ceremony. The temple is under the control of Cochin Devaswom Board.

== Legend ==
The araattu ceremony starts when the Puzhakkal River or locally known as Thanikkudam River overflows in the Monsoon and submerges the idol in the temple. Devotees take a dip in the water along with the idol during the araattu ceremony.
