= Pepper Research Station, Panniyur =

Institution in Kerala, India devoted to the study of black pepper plants

- പെപ്പർ റിസർച്ച് സ്റ്റേഷൻ, പന്നിയൂർ
- Established: 1952
- Field of research: Black pepper cultivation
- Location: Panniyoor, Kerala, 670142, India; 12.08170°N 75.39700°E
- Operating agency: Kerala Agricultural University
- Website: prspanniyur.kau.in
- Location in Panniyur

Pepper Research Station (PRS) is one of the oldest institutions in India under Kerala Agricultural University situated at Panniyoor, Kannur.

PRS started in 1952, and came under KAU in 1972. The institution is known for developing the world's first artificially pollinated variety of Pepper, commonly known as Panniyoor One.
