= Agricultural Research Station, Mannuthy =

Research Station in Kerala, India

Coordinates: 10.535°N 76.268°E

Agricultural Research Station, Mannuthy is a research Station under the Central Zone of Kerala Agricultural University at Mannuthy in Thrissur districts of Kerala, India. This station was established in 1957 as Rice Research Station. Later in 1972 after the formation of Kerala Agricultural University the Rice Research Station along with the Agricultural Research Station brought under the control of KAU. The rice research station and agricultural research stations were merged in 1976 and renamed as Agricultural Research Station, Mannuthy.

This station has a mobile agro machinery repair unit particularly for repairing the Paddy Mechanical Transplanters. The repair unit undertake repairs on service call from farmers. The Farm Machinery Facilitation Centre at Mannuthy also provides information about the machinery and its operations and availability.

Manu lakshmy, a variety of tomato developed by scientists at this station produces the largest fruits and is resistant to bacterial wilt.
