= Wayanad Heritage Museum =

Museum in Ambalavayal, Kerala, India

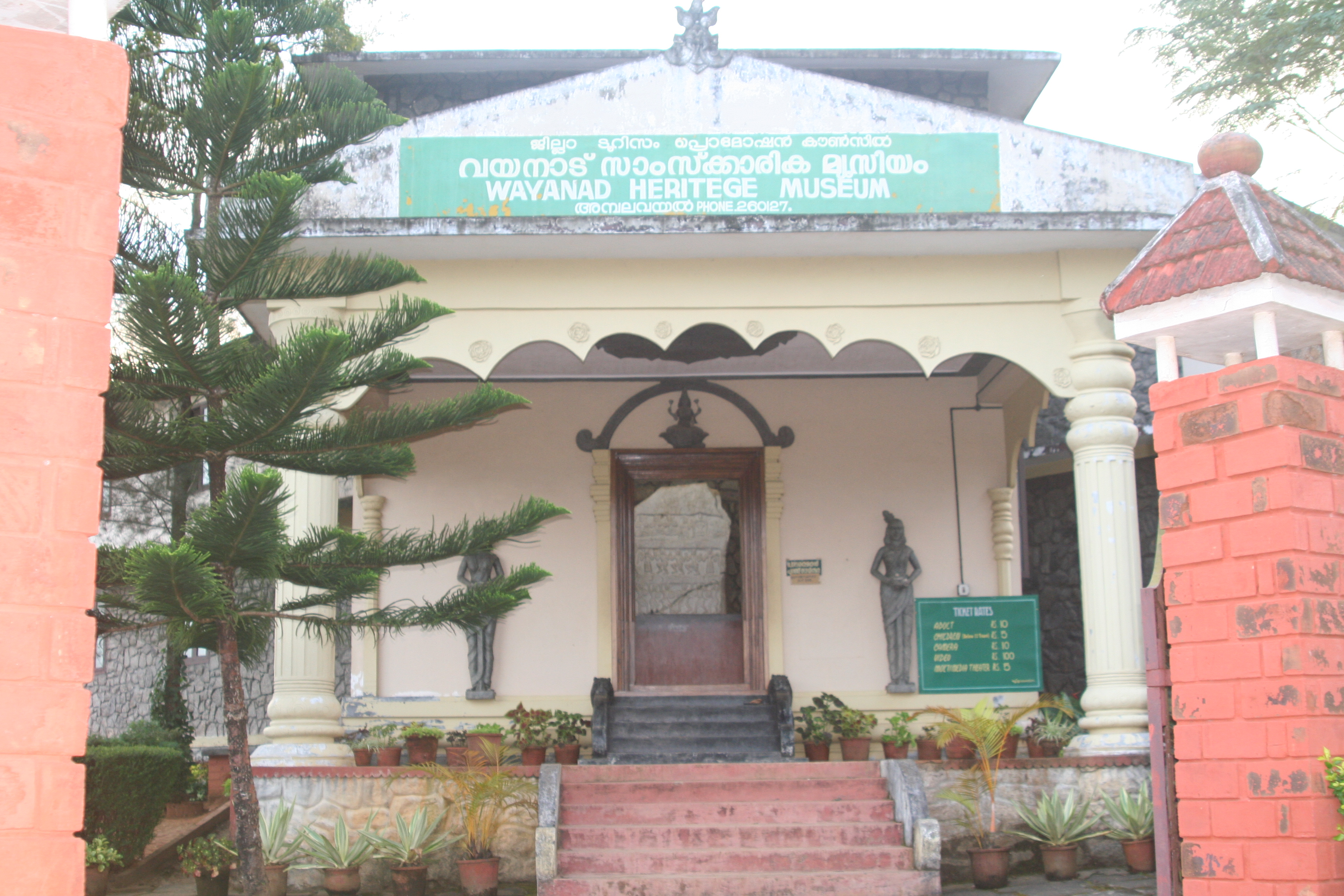
- Wayanad Heritage Museum
- Location: Ambalavayal, Wayanad district, Kerala, India.
- Coordinates: 11.6193°N 76.2106°E
- Curator: District Tourism Promotion Council
- Website: wayanadmuseum.com

Wayanad Heritage Museum, also known as Ambalavayal Heritage Museum is a museum at Ambalavayal, 12 km (7.5 mi) south of Sultan Bathery, in Wayanad district, Kerala, India. It is managed by the District Tourism Promotion Council. It has one of Kerala's largest collections of remnants, dating back to the second century. The museum houses various interesting artifacts revealing the history, culture and heritage of the Wayanad region.

The museum displays tribal relics and artifacts. Four sectors of the museum—the Veerasmruthi, the Gothrasmruthi, the Devasmruthi, and the Jeevanasmruthi—house different types of items ranging from the Neolithic age to the 17th century, including artifacts from ordinary tribal life, decorated memorial grave stones once used to adorn the graves of heroes, and terracotta figures.
