= Madakkathara =

- village
- Location in Kerala, India Madakkathara (India)
- Coordinates: 10°33′0″N 76°15′30″E
- Country: India
- State: Kerala
- District: Thrissur

Government
  - Body: Madakakkathara Grama Panchayath

Population (2011)
  - Total: 16,850

Languages
  - Official: Malayalam, English
- Time zone: UTC+5:30 (IST)
- PIN: 6XXXXX
- Vehicle registration: KL-08

Madakkathara is a village in Thrissur district in the state of Kerala, India.

== Demographics ==
As of the 2011 Indian census, Madakkathara had a population of 16,850 with 8,248 males and 8,602 females. This village is famous for its agricultural nurseries . The Kerala Agricultural University is located in the village, together with Madakkathara 400 kV Substation, which is operated by Power Grid Corporation of India and Kerala State Electricity Board.
