= Shoba Ranganathan =

Indian-Australian bioinformatian and academic

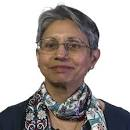
- Education: University of Madras; Indian Institute of Technology Madras; Indian Institute of Technology Delhi
- Scientific career
- Workplaces: Institut de biologie physico-chimique University of New Orleans; Maitreyi College; Jawaharlal Nehru University; University of Sydney; Australian National University; National University of Singapore; Macquarie University
- Thesis: Quantum Chemical Studies of quadratic potential functions using CNDO/Force method and compliance constant formalism (1983)

Shoba Ranganathan is an Indian Australian biochemist who is a professor of bioinformatics at Macquarie University. Her research considers computational biology and bioinformatics, genome annotation and structural bioinformatics.

== Early life and education ==
Shoba was born and grew up in India. She studied Chemistry at the University of Madras, and at the Indian Institute of Technology Madras, and then moved the Indian Institute of Technology Delhi for her doctoral studies, where she started working in computational chemistry. Her post-graduate work looked to identifying new atomic screening constants, while her doctorate developed quadratic potential functions using CNDO/Force. She then moved to the Institut de Biologie physico-chimique followed by the University of New Orleans for post-doctoral research.

== Research and career ==
Shoba started her academic career at Maitreyi College, University of Delhi, where she was made Head of the Department of Chemistry in 1988. She then commenced her bioinformatics career at the Bioinformatics Centre at Jawaharlal Nehru University, as Information Scientist. Moving to Australia in 1993, she worked as a Research Fellow at the University of Sydney, Australian National University and at the Australian National Genomic Information Service. In 2000, she moved to Singapore, joining the National University of Singapore. In 2004, Ranganathan returned to Australia as the first Chair of Bioinformatics at Macquarie University.

Ranganathan's research spans genome annotation. transcriptome and proteome analysis, structural bioinformatics, immunoinformatics and chemoinformatics. She developed theoretical methods for splicing analysis and networking approaches for large-scale data mining. In 2003, she was elected the first Australian Director of the International Society for Computational Biology. In 2008, she was appointed Macquarie node Director of the Australian Research Council Centre of Excellence in Bioinformatics.

In 2019, Ranganathan served as the primary Editor-in-Chief of the Elsevier's Encyclopedia of Bioinformatics and Computational Biology: ABC of Bioinformatics.

Shoba received the Indian National Science Talent Scholarship (1973–1982), the French Government Scholarship (1983–1984) and the UNESCO Chair of Biodiversity Informatics (2004–06). She was elected Fellow of The Abdus Salam International Centre for Theoretical Physics (1989–1991). She was accorded the 2018 Australian Bioinformatics and Computational Biology Society Honorary Senior Fellow Award and the 2023 International Society for Computational Biology's Outstanding Contributions Award.

== Selected publications ==
- S. G. Dove; O. Hoegh-Guldberg; S. Ranganathan (January 2001). "Major colour patterns of reef-building corals are due to a family of GFP-like proteins". Coral Reefs. 19 (3): 197–204. doi:10.1007/pl00006956. ISSN 0722-4028. Wikidata Q57441178.
- Shivashankar H Nagaraj; Robin B Gasser; Shoba Ranganathan (23 May 2006). "A hitchhiker's guide to expressed sequence tag (EST) analysis". Briefings in Bioinformatics. 8 (1): 6–21. doi:10.1093/bib/bbl015. ISSN 1467-5463. PMID 16772268. Wikidata Q34537805.
- Mark W. Robinson; Ranjeeta Menon; Sheila M Donnelly; John P Dalton; Shoba Ranganathan (14 May 2009). "An integrated transcriptomics and proteomics analysis of the secretome of the helminth pathogen Fasciola hepatica: proteins associated with invasion and infection of the mammalian host". Molecular & Cellular Proteomics. 8 (8): 1891–1907. doi:10.1074/mcp.m900045-mcp200. ISSN 1535-9476. PMC 2722771. PMID 19443417. Wikidata Q37294418.
