= Shoba Sivasankar =

Geneticist for the United Nations

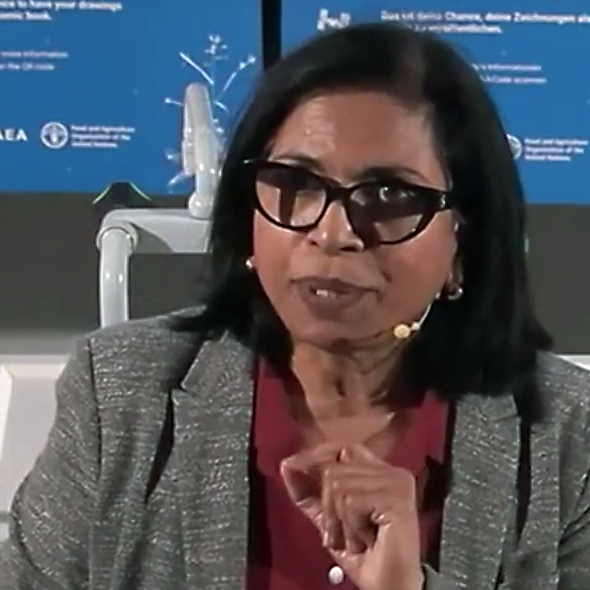
- Born: Kerala
- Alma mater: Kerala Agricultural University; University of Guelph; University of Iowa
- Occupation: Geneticist
- Employer: International Atomic Energy Agency; International Crops Research Institute for the Semi-Arid Tropics

Shoba Sivasankar (Malayalam: ശോഭ ശിവശങ്കർ) is a Geneticist who leads the Plant Breeding and Genetics group of both the International Atomic Energy Agency (IAEA) and the Food and Agriculture Organization of the United Nations.

== Life ==
Shoba Sivasankar was born in the State of Kerala in India. She gained her initial university education at Kerala Agricultural University where she took graduate and masters programmes. She gained her doctorate in Canada at the University of Guelph and Sivasankar also has an MBA from the University of Iowa.

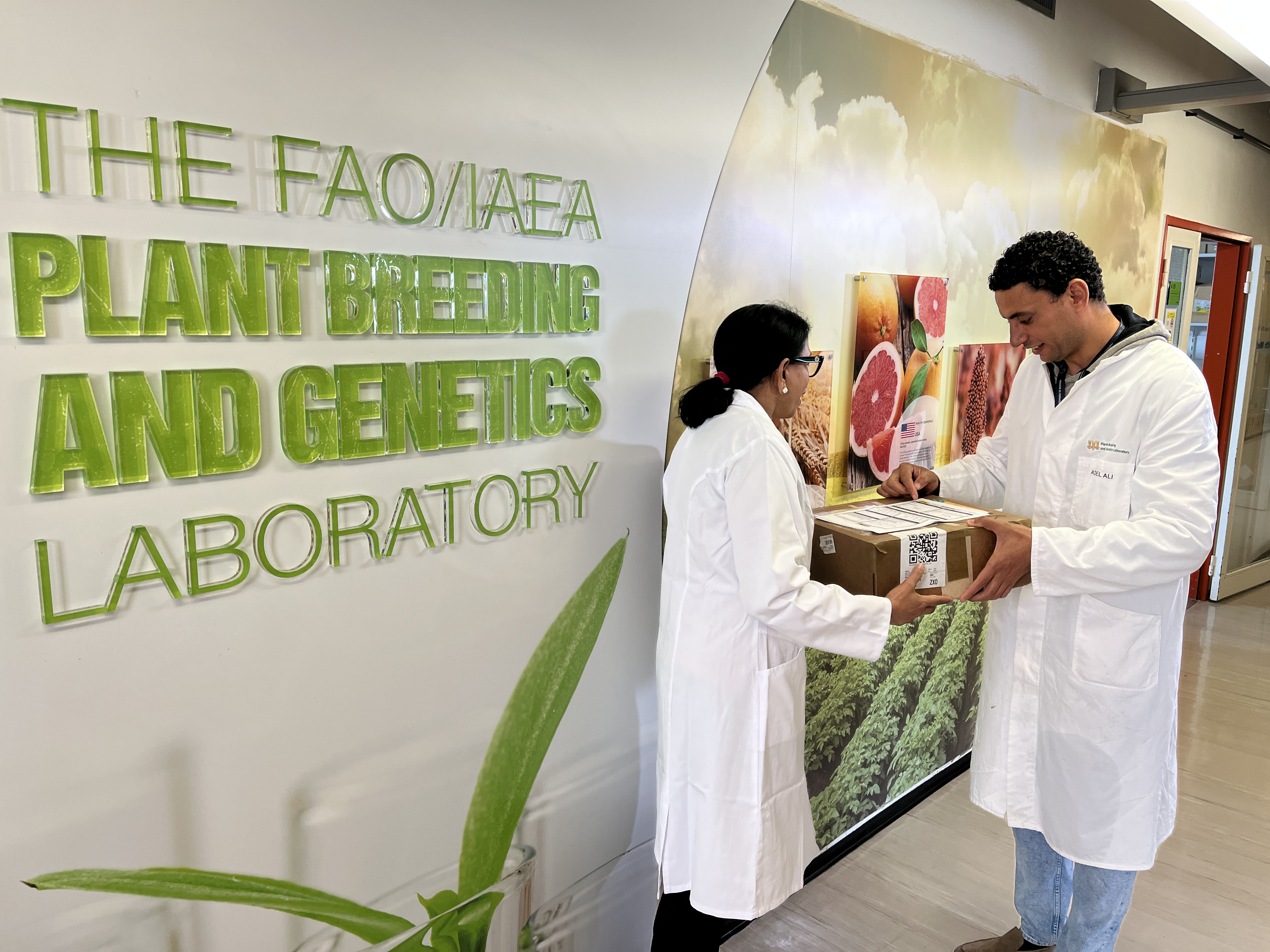
Sivasanker receiving seeds in June 2023 that had been irradiated on the International Space Station

Sivasankar leads the Plant Breeding and Genetics group at the International Atomic Energy Agency (IAEA) and the Food and Agriculture Organization of the United Nations in Seibersdorf in Austria. The facility there has the equipment necessary to irradiate seeds to cause mutations. A process known as mutagenesis which can cut the development time of new seed variants by 50%. The seeds are also sent from researchers from many countries who do not have access to the specialist equipment. Mutagenesis was very popular but some countries have decided to manipulate the DNA directly, however Sivasankar and eastern countries like China need more complex manipulations to cope with the many variables seen by small farmers. The IAEA has a library of 3,400 new varieties (in 2023) and more than 800 of them are Chinese discoveries.

Achieving sustainable cultivation of grain legumes was published in 2018 in two volumes and Sivasankar was the lead author. Grain lugumes are important crops and she and her c-authors discuss advances in breeding and cultivation methods.

In 2021 she was the lead author of Mutation Breeding, Genetic Diversity and Crop Adaptation to Climate Change which she created with Thomas Henry Noel Ellis, Ljupcho Jankuloski and Ivan Ingelbrecht. She helped with research that found Crop disease resistance genes from landraces can provide more resistance than modern varieties.

Sivasanker received seeds at the IAEA's research facility in June 2023 that had been irradiated on the International Space Station. The seeds were sent into orbit in the previous November and the planned work will determine the effects of the cosmic ray irradiation on the seeds' genetics.

== Selected publications ==
- Achieving sustainable cultivation of grain legumes, 2018, lead author
- Mutation Breeding, Genetic Diversity and Crop Adaptation to Climate Change, 2021, lead author
