= Institute of Agricultural Sciences, Banaras Hindu University =

Institute in Banaras Hindu University, Uttar Pradesh, India

Coordinates: 25.2583268°N 82.9848228°E

- Seal of the institute
- Established: 1931
- Parent institution: Banaras Hindu University
- Dean: DR. Uday Pratap Singh
- Director: Dr. Uday Pratap Singh
- Undergraduates: 550
- Postgraduates: 180
- Doctoral students: 70
- Location: Varanasi, Uttar Pradesh, India
- Campus: MAIN CAMPUS + RGSC (BHU)
- Sporting affiliations: SAAHAS
- Website: www.bhu.ac.in/Site/UnitHomeTemplate/1_35_1104_Main-Site-Institutes-and-Faculties

Institute of Agricultural Sciences, Banaras Hindu University (IAS, BHU) is one of India's premier agricultural colleges located in Varanasi in Uttar Pradesh state. It is one of the three institutes of the Banaras Hindu University.

== History ==
IAS was established in 1931 on the recommendation of the British Raj's Royal Commission on Agriculture as the Institute of Agricultural Research of the BHU. It was one of two oldest agricultural science institutes in the Indian subcontinent, and the first institute to begin Masters and Doctoral programs in the field. Undergraduate programs were introduced in 1945, and the institute was renamed as the College of Agriculture. It was renamed as the Faculty of Agriculture in 1968.

In 1969, the college was re-organized into 6 departments, Plant Physiology, Agronomy, Genetics & Plant Breeding, Soil Science & Agricultural Chemistry, Plant Pathology and Agricultural Economics. The areas of study and research were gradually expanded to include Horticulture, Entomology & Agricultural Zoology, Animal Husbandry & Dairy Farming, Farm Engineering, etc.

In 1980, with expanded focus and investment in agricultural education & research from the Indian Council of Agricultural Research, the college was re-organized as an independent Institute of Agricultural Sciences affiliated with the BHU.

== Infrastructure ==
IAS is located on the main campus of BHU on the southern outskirts of Varanasi. It has a 65 hectares (160 acres) farm on the main campus. The institute manages a dairy for research and study purposes with capacity of about 400 animals. IAS also has a horticultural unit for development, study and research of flowering plants and a specialized unit for medicinal plants.

IAS also manages the Krishi Vigyan Kendra (KVK) (Agricultural Science Centre) on the south campus of BHU in Barkachha, Mirzapur district about 60 kilometres (37 mi) southwest of Varanasi. KVK manages over 1,000 hectares (2,500 acres) of farms for research and community education purposes.

In addition to the main Sayaji Rao Gaekwad Library of BHU, IAS students and staff also have access to the Institute Library that has specialized collections of journals, periodicals and volumes related to agricultural sciences.

== Notable alumni ==
- Saket Kushwaha, Vice Chancellor Rajiv Gandhi University, former Vice Chancellor of Lalit Narayan Mithila University, Professor at Banaras Hindu University
- B.B. Pattanaik, Managing Director Central Warehousing Corporation, former Joint Commissioner (Storage & Research) in the Department of Food & Public Distribution, Ministry of Consumer Affairs, Food & Public Distribution, Government of India.
