= Vellanikkara =

- town
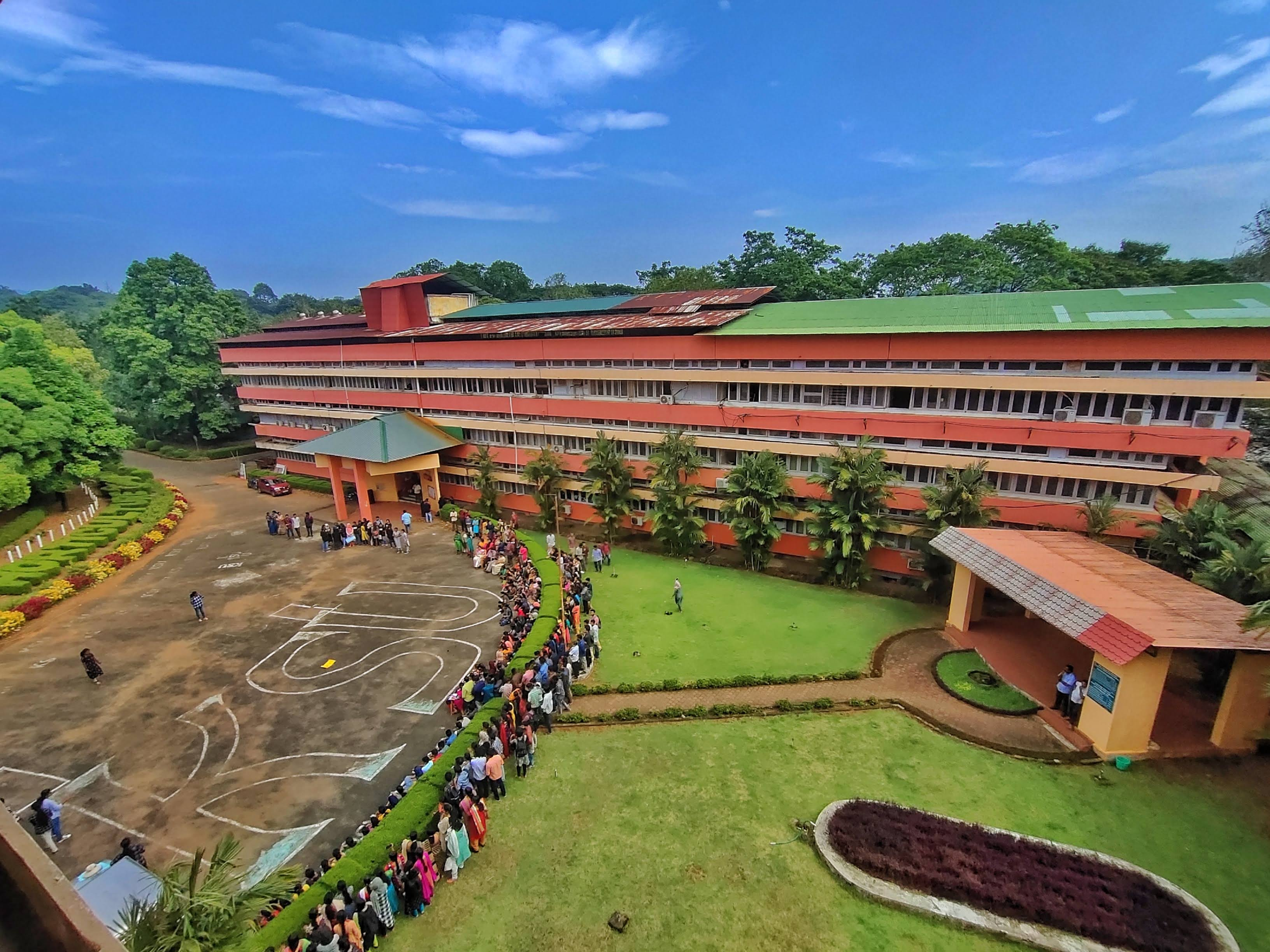
- Kerala Agricultural University

- Location in Kerala, India
- Coordinates: 10.5465°N 76.2857°E
- Country: India
- State: Kerala
- District: Thrissur

Government
  - Body: Thrissur Municipal Corporation, Madakakkathara Grama Panchayath
- Elevation: 22.25 m (73.0 ft)

Languages
  - Official: Malayalam, English
- Time zone: UTC+5:30 (IST)
- Vehicle registration: KL-08

Vellanikkara is a suburban area of Thrissur city of Kerala, south India. Its only 9 km from Swaraj Round. Kerala Agricultural University is located at Vellanikkara.
