= Ambalavayal =

- Town
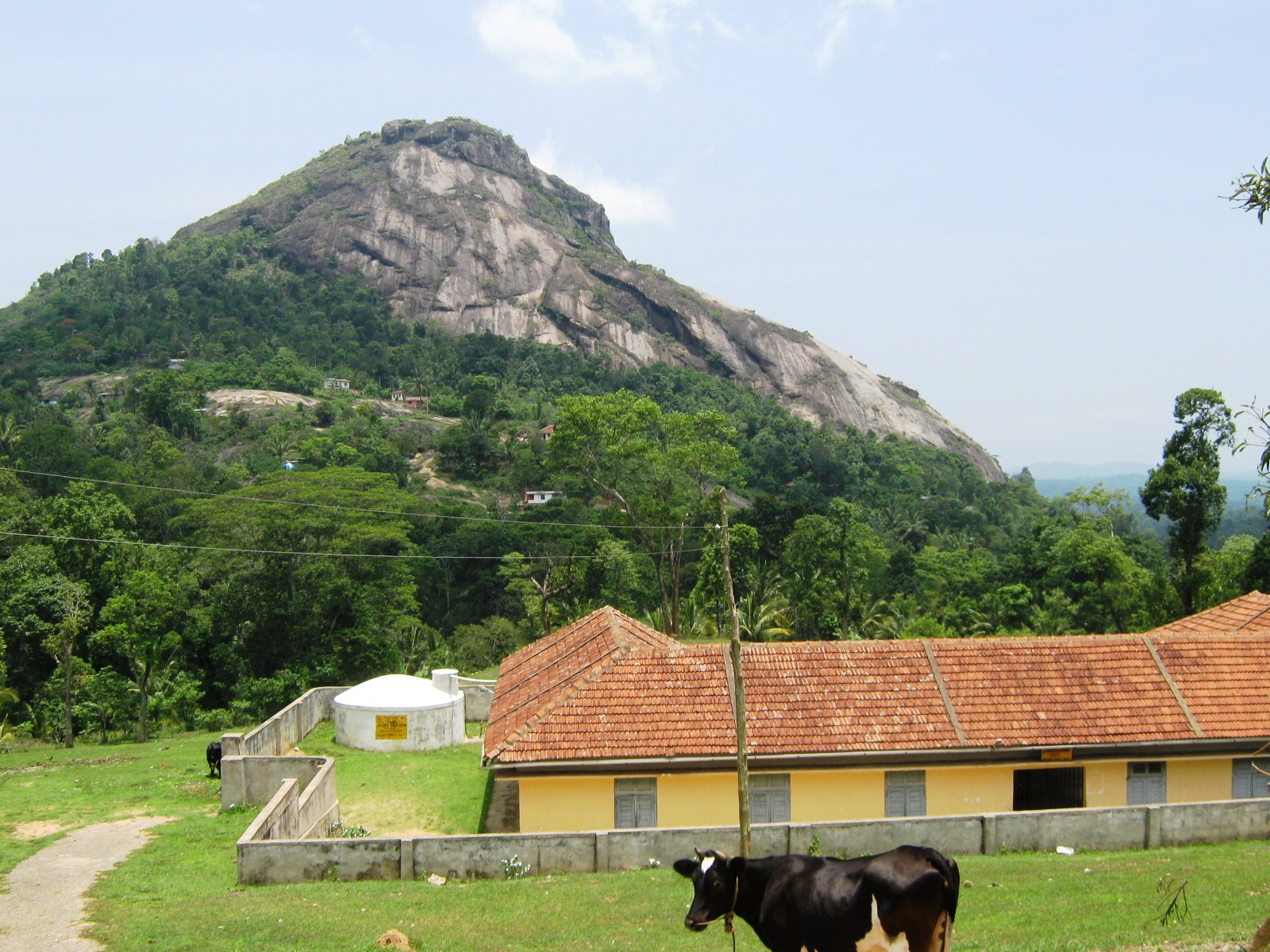
- A view of Phantom Rock, Ambalayavayal
- Interactive map of Ambalavayal
- Coordinates: 11.6190100°N 76.210170°E
- Country: India
- State: Kerala
- District: Wayanad

Population (2011)
  - Total: 16,988

Languages
  - Official: Malayalam, English
- Time zone: UTC+5:30 (IST)
- PIN: 673593
- Telephone code: 04936
- ISO 3166 code: IN-KL
- Vehicle registration: KL-73
- Lok Sabha constituency: Wayanad
- Vidhan Sabha constituency: Sulthan Bathery

Ambalavayal is a town in Wayanad district in the state of Kerala, India. The Wayanad Heritage Museum is located in the village.

== Demographics ==
As of the 2011 Census of India, Ambalavayal had a population of 16,988 with 8,290 males and 8,698 females.

== Villages and Suburbs ==
- Chulliyod
- Thekkankolly
- Nenmeni
- Malika

== Image gallery ==
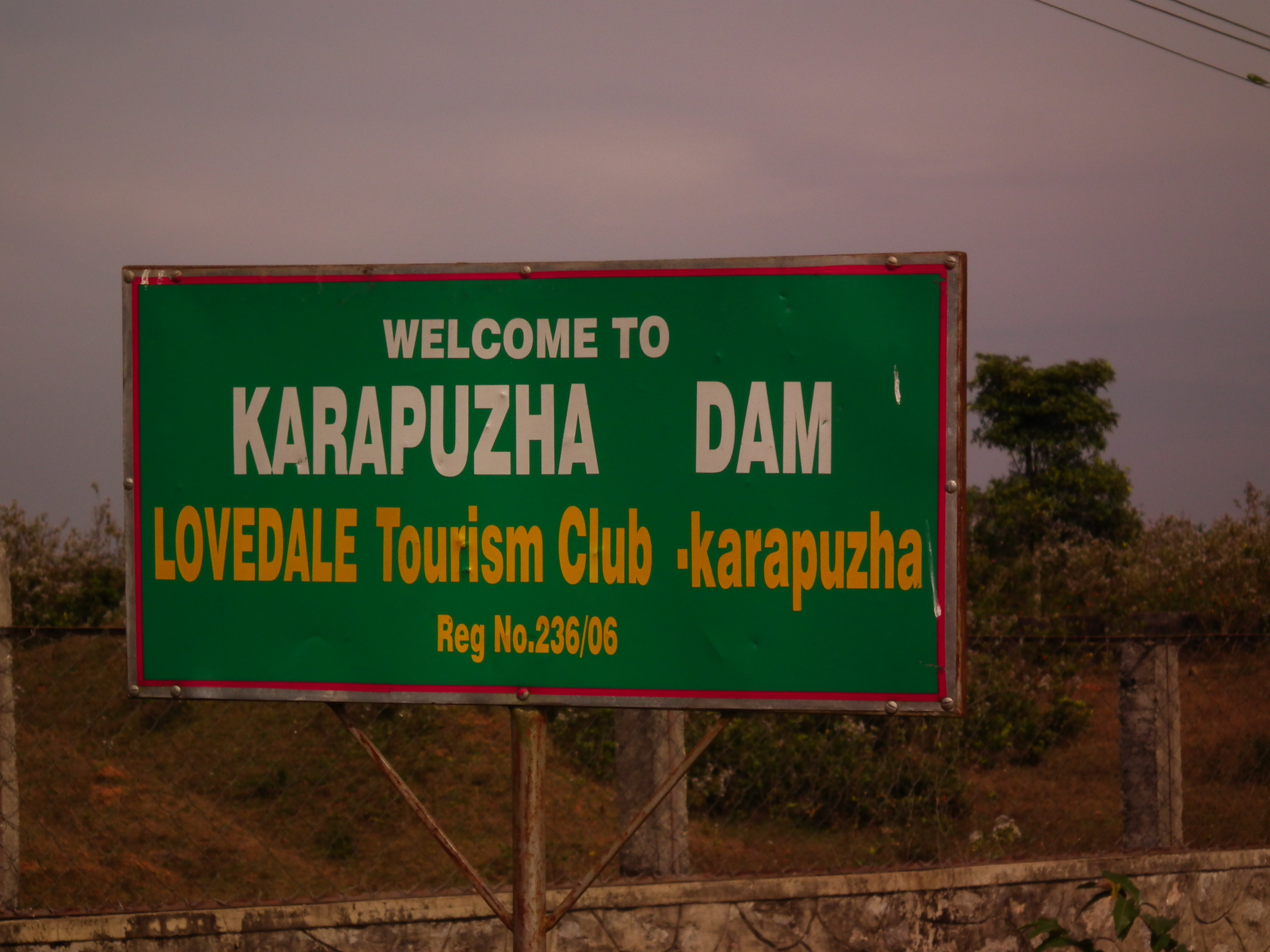
Welcome board

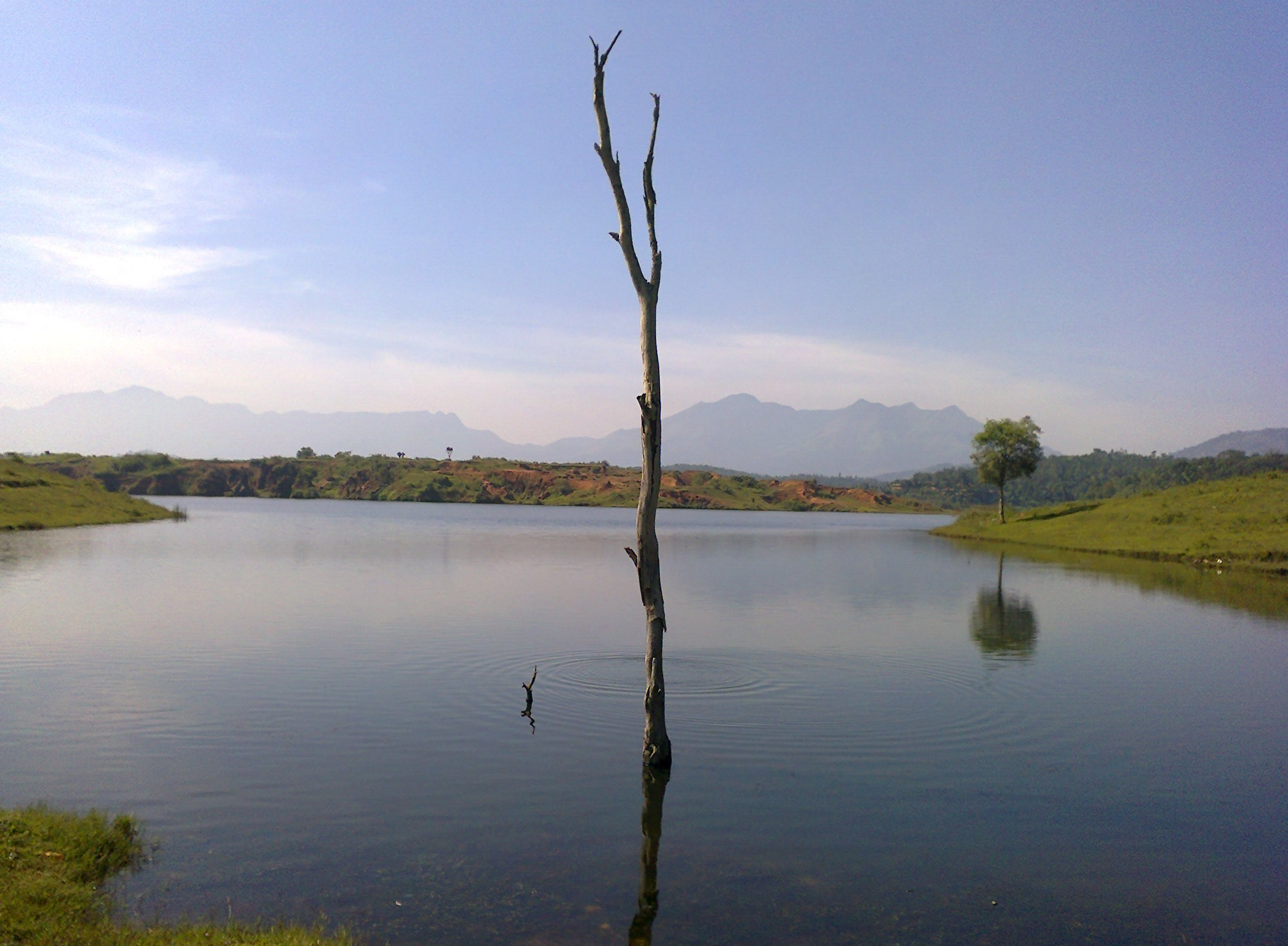
Karapuzha Dam

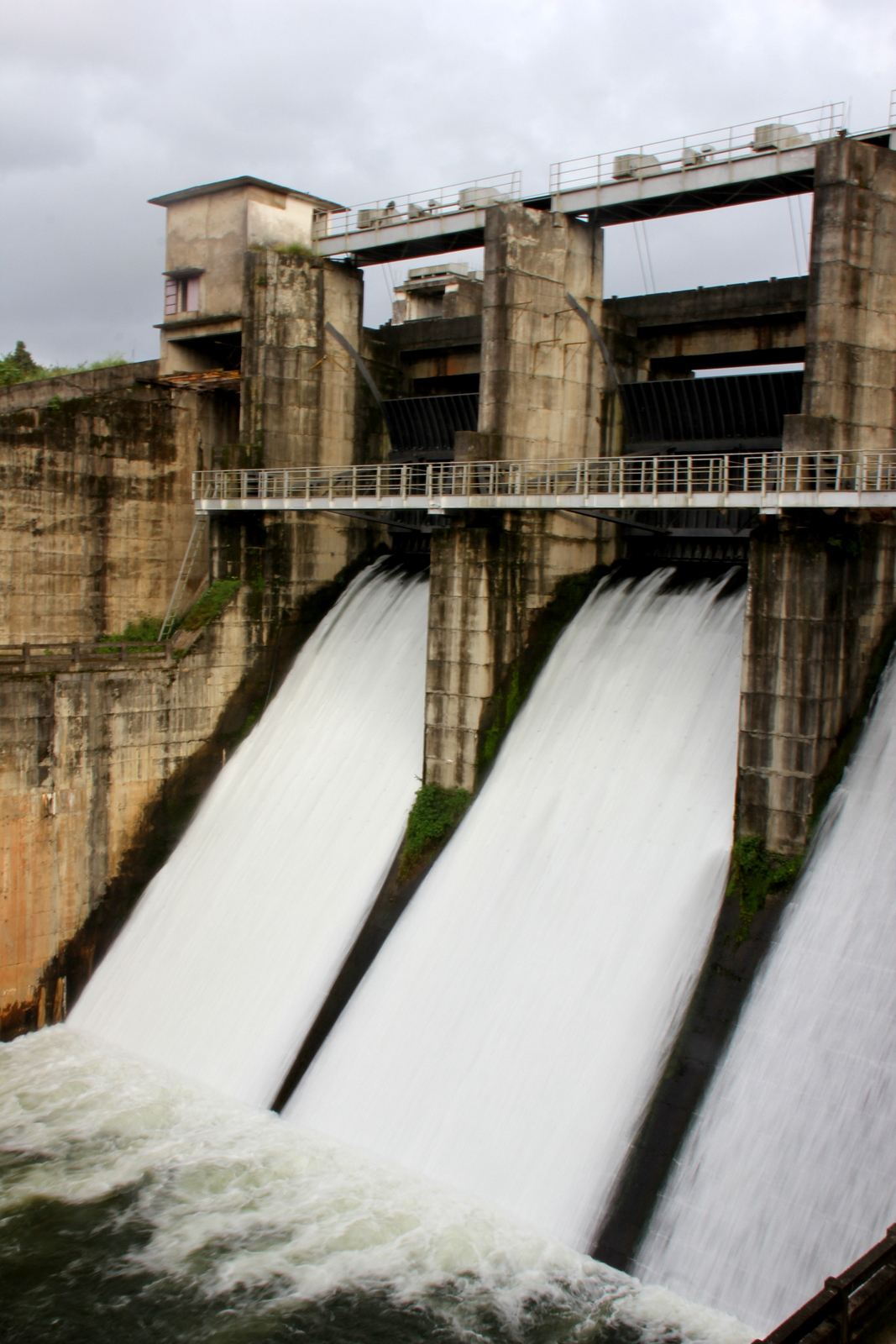
Karapuzha Dam

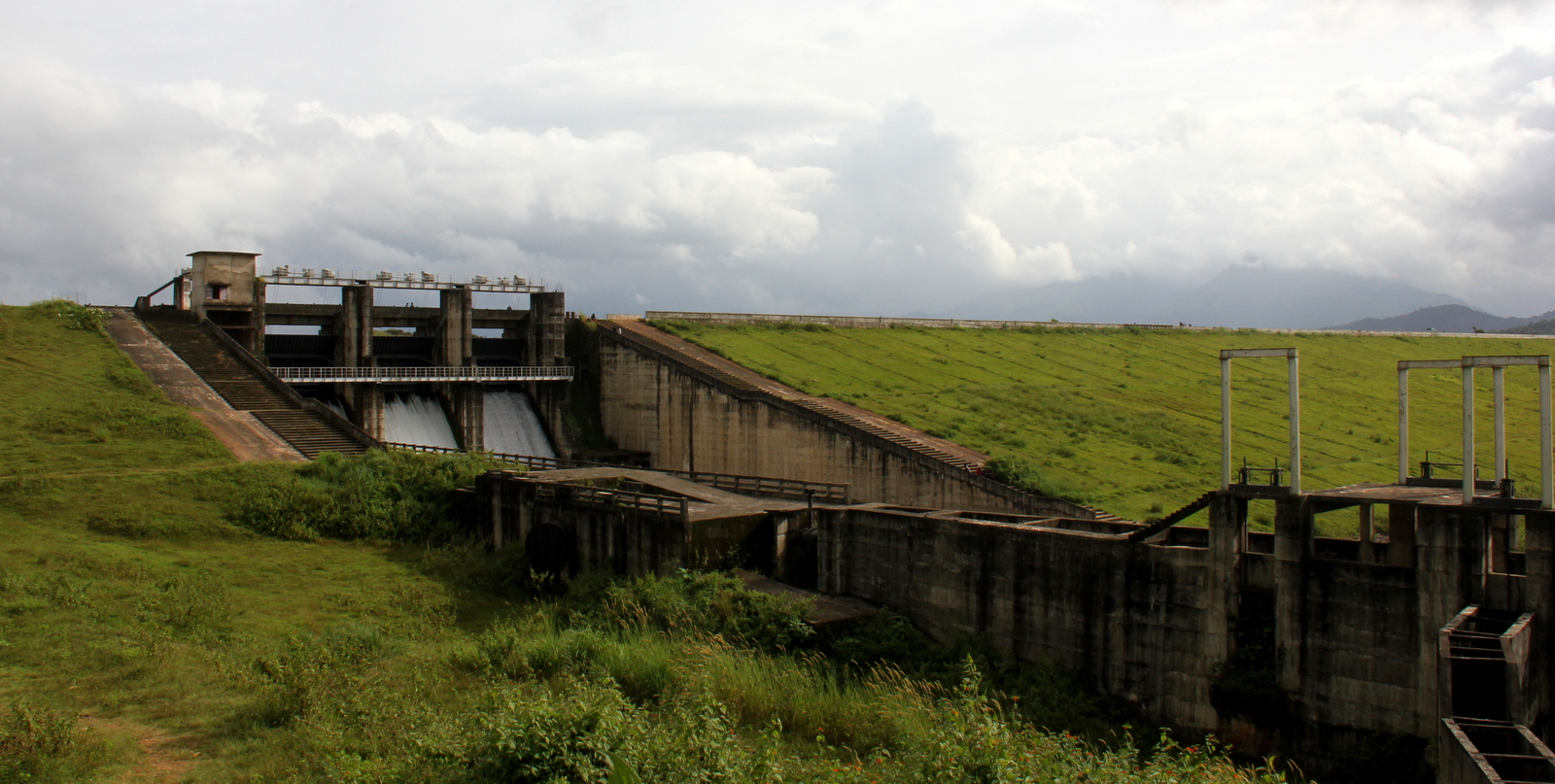
Karapuzha Dam

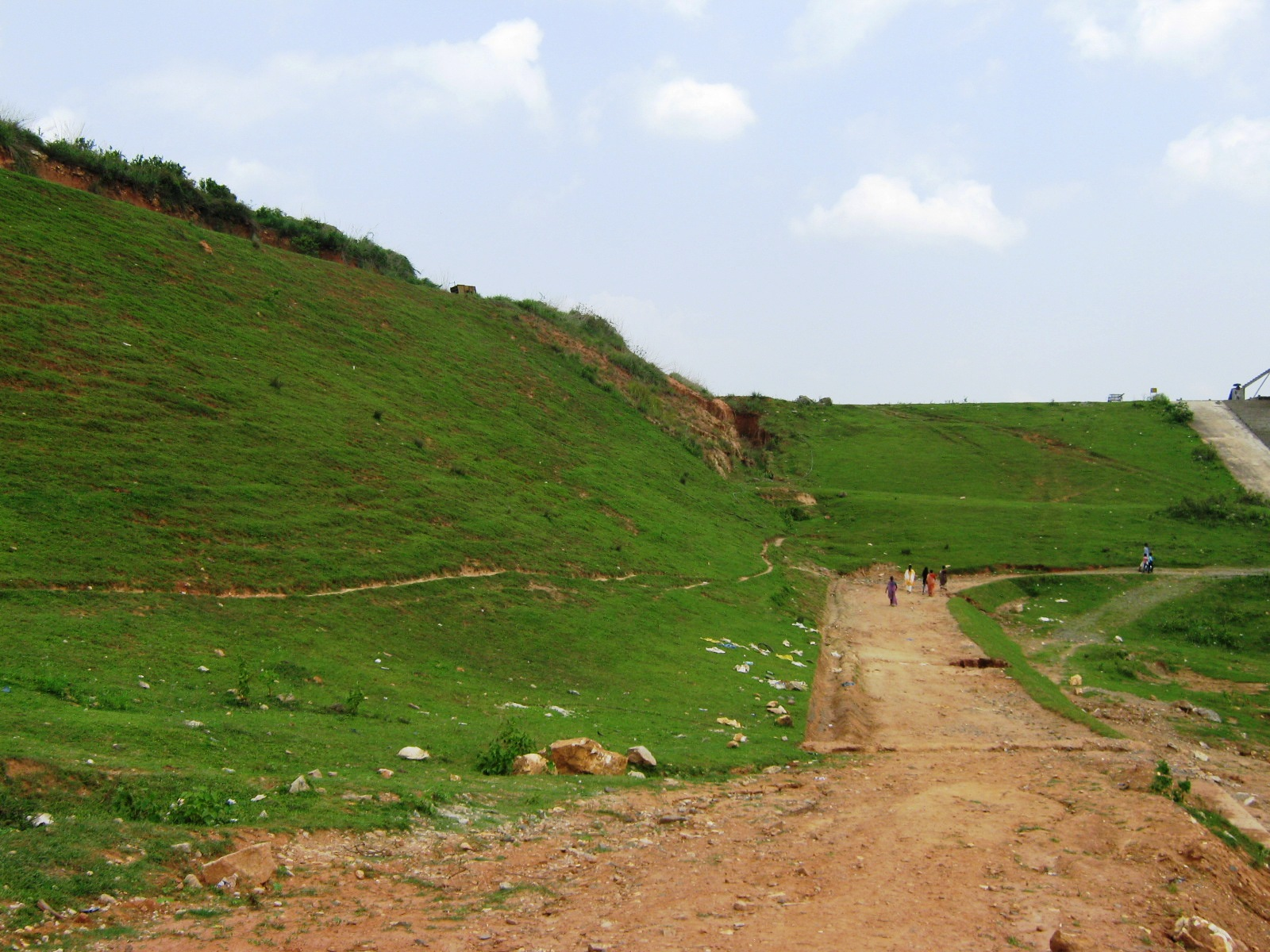
Karappuzha Dam
