= Kerala Agricultural University =

State University in Kerala

- Type: Public
- Established: 1971; 55 years ago
- Founders: Department of Agriculture and Farmers' Welfare; Government of Kerala
- Accreditation: ICAR
- Chancellor: Governor of Kerala
- Vice-Chancellor: T. Sajitha Rani (I/C)
- Location: Vellanikkara Mannuthy, Thrissur, Kerala, Kerala, 680 656, India; 10.54529495659627°N 76.28587940243338°E
- Campus: Rural
- Acronym: KAU
- Mission: Excellence in Agricultural Education; Research and Extension for Sustainable Agricultural Development; Livelihood security of farming community
- Campus spread: College of Agriculture Vellanikkara
- Website: kau.in

Kerala Agricultural University (KAU) is a state university for agricultural education, recognised as a State Agricultural University by the Indian Council of Agricultural Research (ICAR). It is situated in Vellanikkara, Kerala, India.

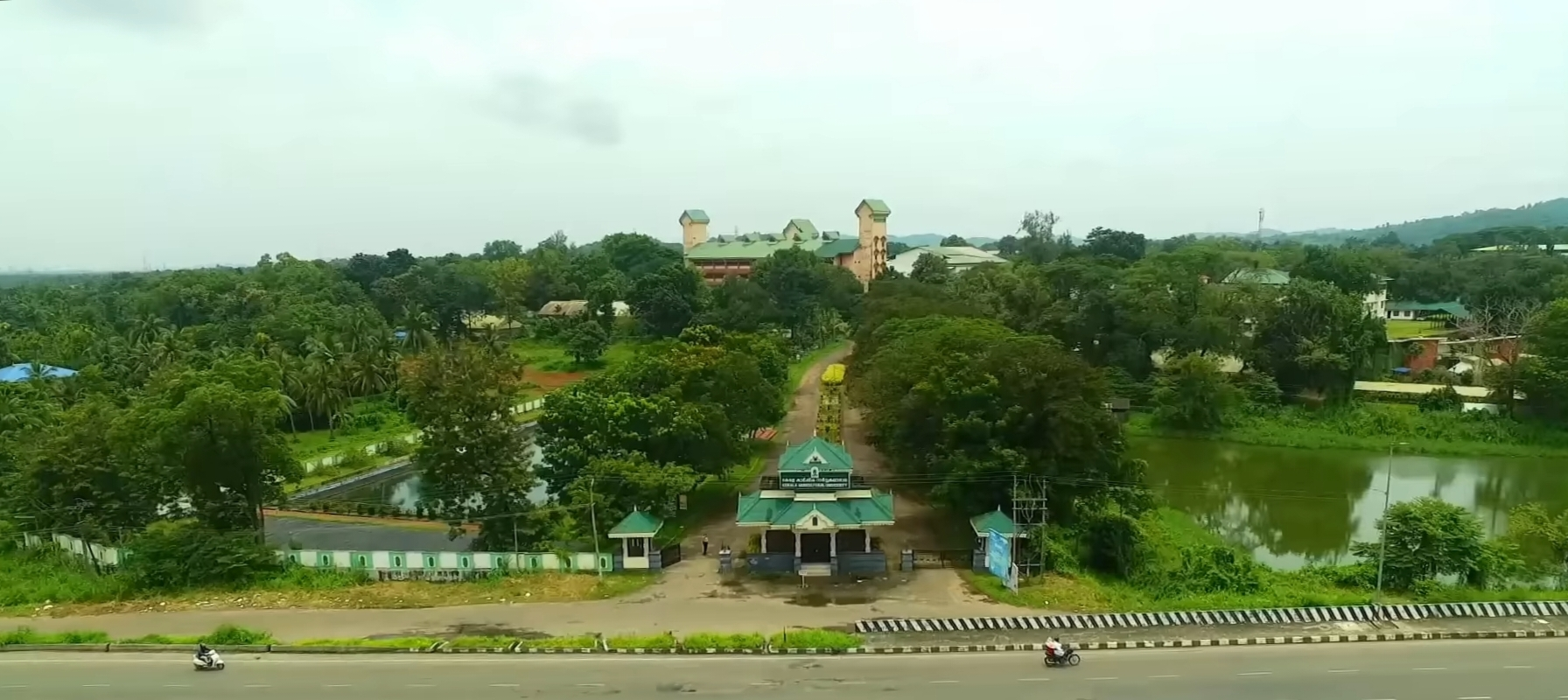
The KAU is the primary and the principal instrumentality of the Kerala State in providing human resources, and skills and technology, required for the sustainable development of its agriculture, defined broadly as encompassing all production activities based on land and water, including crop production, forestry and co-operatives by conducting, interfacing and integrating education, research and extension in these spheres of economic endeavour.

== History ==
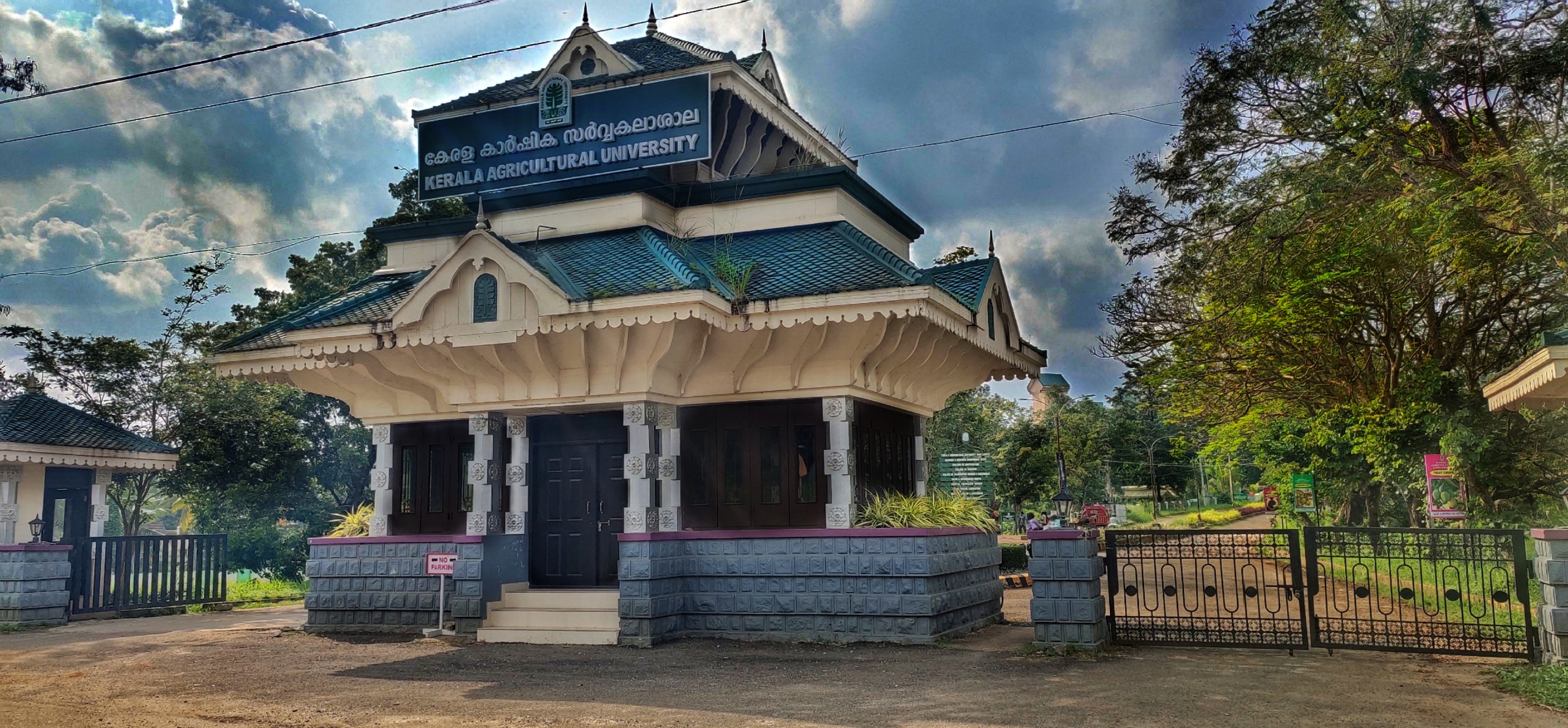
Entrance of Kerala Agricultural University Vellanikkara Mannuthy Thrissur

On the recommendation of the Kothari Commission (1964-1966), one Agricultural University was to be established in each state. Kerala Agricultural University (KAU) was established on 24 February 1971 by the Act 33 of 1971 and began functioning on 1 February 1972. In accordance with the KAU Act of 1971, the College of Agriculture, Vellayani and the College of Veterinary and Animal Sciences, Mannuthy were brought under Kerala Agricultural University, in addition, 21 agricultural and animal husbandry research stations were also transferred to KAU. In 2011, Kerala Agricultural University was trifurcated into Kerala Veterinary and Animal Sciences University (KVASU), Kerala University of Fisheries and Ocean Studies (KUFOS) and Kerala Agricultural University (KAU).

== Faculties ==
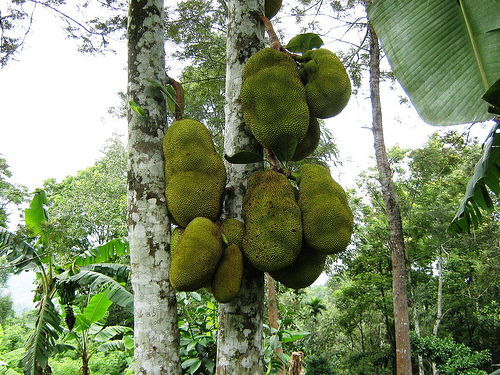
Regional Agricultural Research Center, Ambalavayal, Wayanad

For each degree, its respective faculty also offer specialized concentrations

=== Faculty of Agriculture ===
Degrees offered:

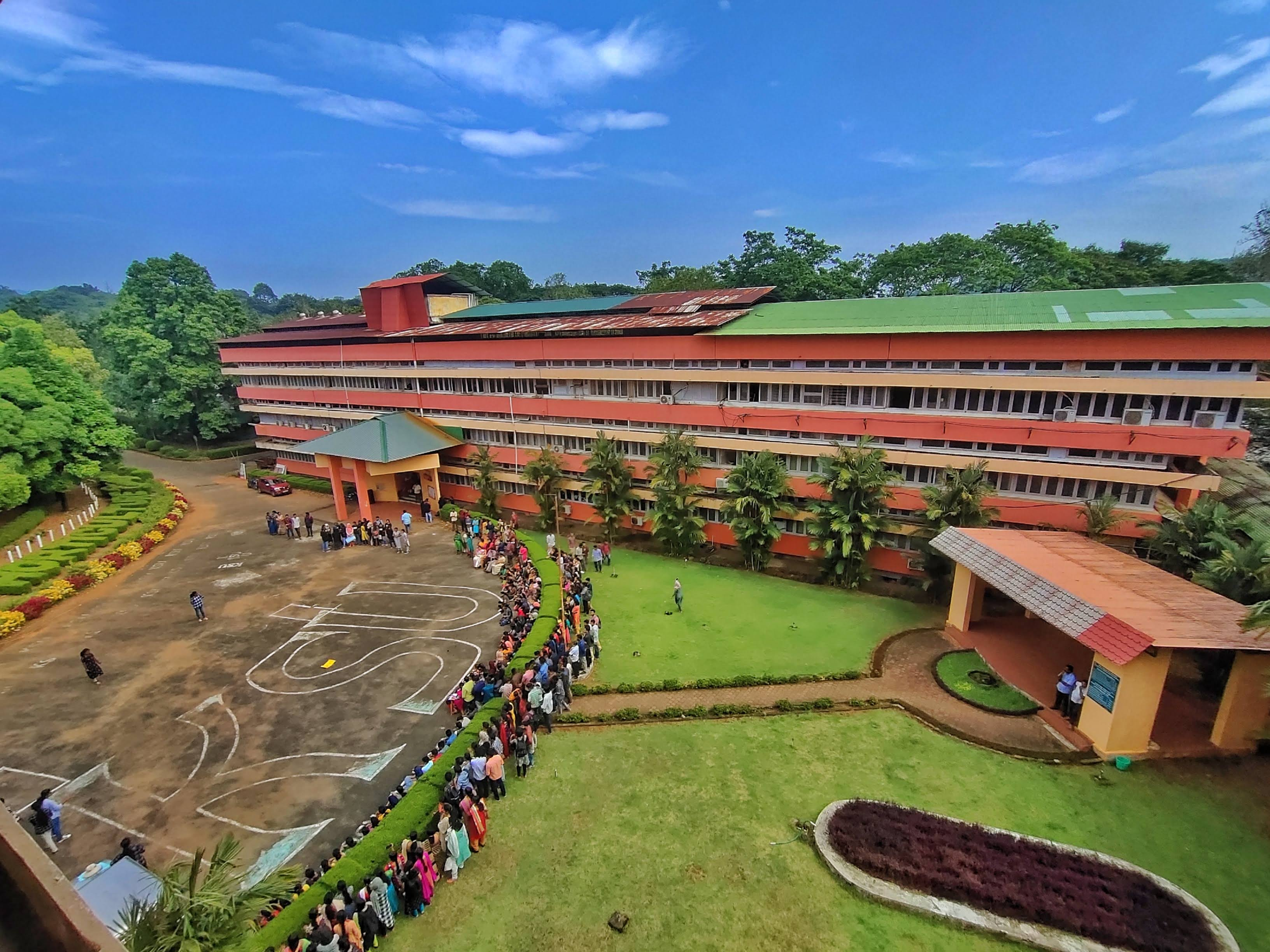
College of Agriculture, Vellanikkara, Thrissur.

- Agriculture: Diploma, BSc, MSc & PhD
- Biotechnology: B Tech
- Horticulture: MSc
- Food Science & Nutrition: MSc & PhD
- Agricultural Statistics: MSc
- Agricultural Biotechnology: MSc, IMSc & PhD
- Climate Change Adaptation: IMSc
- Co-operation & Banking: BSc, MSc & PhD
- Agri Business Management: MBA

=== Faculty of Forestry ===
Degrees offered:

- Forestry: BSc, MSc & PhD

=== Faculty of Agricultural Engineering & Technology ===
Degree offered:

- Agricultural Engineering: BTech, MTech, PhD
- Food Technology: BTech

=== Faculty of Fisheries ===
Delinked from KAU in 2010 to form separate University-KUFOS

The Governor of Kerala and Chancellor of Kerala Agricultural University (KAU) has accorded assent to the proposal to establish a full-fledged Faculty of Forestry at Vellanikkara. Forestry will be the third faculty under KAU after Agriculture and Agricultural Engineering. Two other faculties, viz. Veterinary and Fisheries were delinked from KAU in 2010 to form separate Universities.

== Institutions ==
The institutions under Kerala Agricultural University are.

- College of Agriculture KAU Campus Vellanikkara, Thrissur (CoA Vellanikkara)
- College of Agriculture Vellayani, Thiruvananthapuram (CoA Vellayani)
- College of Agriculture Padannakkad, Kasaragod (CoA Padannakkad)
- College of Agriculture Ambalavayal, Wayanad (CoA Ambalavayal)
- College of Forestry KAU Campus Vellanikkara, Thrissur (CoF Vellanikkara)
- College of Co-operation, Banking & Management KAU Campus Vellanikkara, Thrissur (CoCBM Vellanikkara)
- College of Climate Change & Environmental Science KAU Campus Vellanikkara, Thrissur (CoCCES Vellanikkara)
- Kelappaji College of Agricultural Engineering & Technology Thavanur, Malappuram (KCoAET Thavanur)
- Regional Agricultural Research Station Pattambi, Palakkad (RARS Pattambi)

=== Research Stations ===
- Pepper Research Station Panniyur, Kannur (PRS Panniyur)
- Regional Agricultural Research Station Pilicode, Kasaragod (RARS Pilicode)
- Cardamom Research Station, Pampadumpara, Idukki (CRS Pambadumpara)
- Regional Agricultural Research Station Ambalavayal, Wayanad (RARS Ambalavayal)
- Agronomic Research Station, Chalakudy, Thrissur
- Agricultural Research Station, Mannuthy, Thrissur
- Aromatic and Medicinal Plants Research Station, Odakkali, Ernakulam
- Regional Agricultural Research Station, Pattambi, Palakkad
- Banana Research Station, Kannara, Thrissur
- Cashew Research Station Madakkathara, Thrissur
- Cashew Research Station Anakkayam, Malappuram
- Pineapple Research Station Vazhakulam, Muvattupuzha, Ernakulam
- Plant Propagation and Nursery Management Unit KAU Campus, Thrissur
- ADS Karumady, Alappuzha
- Regional Agricultural Research Station Kumarakom, Kottayam
- Rice Research Station Vyttila, Kochi
- Rice Research Station, Moncombu, Alappuzha
- SRS Pulikeezhu, Pathanamthitta
- Onattukara Regional Agricultural Research Station Kayamkulam, Alappuzha
- CSRC Karamana, Thiruvananthapuram
- CRS Balaramapuram, Thiruvananthapuram
- FSRS Sadanandapuram, Kottarakkara, Kollam
- Regional Agricultural Research Station Vellayani, Thiruvananthapuram
- SCRC Konni, Pathanamthitta
- Fruit Crops Research Station, Vellanikkara, Thrissur

=== Training & Extension Centres ===
- ATIC Mannuthy, Thrissur
- CC Mannuthy, Thrissur
- CTI Mannuthy, Thrissur
- ISC Mannuthy, Thrissur
- KVK Sadananthapuram, Kollam
- KVK Pattambi, Palakkad
- KVK Ambalavayal, Wayanad
- KVK KAU Campus, Thrissur
- KVK Kumarakom, Kottayam
- KVK Taliparamba, Kannur
- KVK Tavanur, Malappuram
- AISC, Vengeri, Kozhikkode
- ETC, Manjeswar

== Notable alumni ==
- Jacob Thomas, former DGP of Kerala State
- Joe Paul, Indian Lyricist and Music Composer
- Anuja Akathoottu, Researcher, Scientist
- Dr. Shobha Sivasankar, Indian geneticist at IAEA & FAO
- P. B. Nooh, IAS
- Dr. D. Sajith Babu, IAS
