= List of educational institutions in Wayanad district =

== Universities ==
- KVASU, Pookode
- Kannur University Mananthavady Campus, Mananthavady

== Professional colleges ==
- DM WIMS Medical College, Naseera Nagar, Meppadi
- DM WIMS Nursing College, Naseera Nagar, Meppadi
- DM WIMS College of Pharmacy, Naseera Nagar, Meppadi
- Government Engineering College, Wayanad, Mananthavady
- Oriental School of Hotel Management, Lakkidi, Kalpetta
- College of Veterinary and Animal Sciences, Pookode, Kalpetta
- Oriental College of Hotel Management and Culinary Arts, Vythiri, Kalpetta
- College of Dairy Science and Technology, Pookode, Kalpetta
- Oriental Institute for Management Studies, Vythiri, Kalpetta
- Centre for Computer Science and Information Technology of Calicut University, Muttil, Kalpetta
- Centre for PG Studies in Social Work of Calicut University, Sultan Bathery
- Government Polytechnic College, Meenangadi
- Government Polytechnic College, Meppadi, Kalpetta
- Government Polytechnic College, Dwaraka, Mananthavady
- Vinayaka College of Nursing, Sultan Bathery
- KMM Government ITI, Kalpetta
- Government ITI for Women, Nenmeni, Sultan Bathery

== Arts and Science Colleges ==
- St. Mary's College, Sultan Bathery
- NMSM Government College, Kalpetta
- WMO Arts & Science College, Muttil, Kalpetta
- Government College, Mananthavady
- Pazhassi Raja College, Pulpally
- Mary Matha Arts & Science College, Mananthavady
- Don Bosco College, Sultan Bathery
- Green Mount Arts & Science College, Padinjarethara, Kalpetta
- PM Charitable Trust, Arts & Science College, Meppadi, Kalpetta
- SNDP Yogam Arts & Science College, Pulpally
- Alphonsa Arts & Science College, Sultan Bathery
- CM College of Arts and Science Nadavayal
- WMO Arts & Science College, Koolivayal, Mananthavady
- PKKM College of Applied Science (under IHRD), Mananthavady
- Model College of Applied Science (under IHRD), Meenangadi
- Jayasree Arts & Science College, Kalluvayal, Pulpally
- St. Mary's College, Meenangadi
- WMO Imam Gazzali College, Panamaram

== Schools ==
=== Federal Schools ===
- Kendriya Vidyalaya, Kalpetta
- Jawahar Navodaya Vidyalaya, Wayanad

=== Government Schools ===
- G H S S, Padinjarathara Padinjarathara
- G H S S, Kakkavayal Kakkavayal
- G H S S, Kartikulam Kartikulam
- G H S S, Koleri Koleri
- G H S S, Moolankavu Moolankavu
- G H S S, Panamkandy Karani
- G H S S, Thrissileri Thrissileri
- G H S S, Vaduvanchal Vaduvanchal
- AMMR H S S, Nalloornadu Nalloornadu
- G H S S, Cheeral Cheeral
- G H S S, Kaniyambetta Kaniyambetta
- G H S S, Meenangadi Meenangadi
- G H S S, Meppadi Meppadi
- G H S S, Panamaram Panamaram
- G H S S Thalapuzha Thalapuzha
- G H S S Thariode Thariode
- G H S S Valad Valad
- G M H S S Vellamunda Vellamunda
- G H S Pariyaram Kalpetta

=== Govt. Vocational Higher Secondary Schools ===
- G V H S S Ambalavayal Ambalavayal
- G V H S S Kalpetta Kalpetta
- G V H S S Mananthavadi Mananthavadi
- G V H S S Sultan Bathery Sultan Bathery

=== Aided Higher Secondary Schools ===
- St. THOMAS HS NADAVAYAL (Estd in 1957)
- Jayasree HSS Kalluvayal Kalanadikolly
- Sacret Heart HSS Dwaraka Nalloornadu
- SKMJ HSS Kalpetta Kalpetta
- SN HSS Poothadi Poothadi
- St. Catherine's HSS Payyampally Payyampally
- St. Joseph's HSS Kallodi Edavaka
- St. Joseph's HSS Meppadi Meppadi
- St. Mary's College HSS Bathery Kuppadi
- St. Mary's HSS Mullenkolly Mullenkolly
- Vijaya HSS Pulpally Pulpally
- WO HSS Pinangode Vengapally

=== Aided Vocational Higher Secondary Schools ===
- Devi Vilasam V H S S Veliyambam Veliyambam
- WO V H S S Muttil Muttil

=== Unaided Higher Secondary Schools ===
- De Paul Public School Kalpetta
- MGM EM HSS Mananthavay Mananthavady
- NSS English Medium HSS Kalpetta Kalpetta
- St. Peters & St. Pauls HSS Meenangadi Meenangadi
- St. Joseph's Higher Secondary School, Sultan Bathery
