= Education in Kalpetta =

Education in Kalpetta includes every level from elementary schools to universities.

== University ==
- Kerala Veterinary and Animal Sciences University, Pookode (14 km from Kalpetta)

== Professional education ==
1. College of Veterinary and Animal Sciences at Pookode (14 km from Kalpetta)
2. Oriental School of Hotel Management located at Lakkidi (15 km from Kalpetta)
3. Oriental College of Hotel Management and Culinary Arts at Vythiri (8 km from Kalpetta)
4. DM WIMS Medical College located at Meppadi (15 km) is the only Medical College in Wayanad district
5. College of Dairy Science and Technology, Pookode offers B.Tech. degree course in Dairy Science & Technology
6. Oriental Institute for Management Studies, Vythiri
7. College of Engineering, Thalapuzha, Wayanad
8. DM WIMS Nursing College located at Meppadi
9. Centre for Computer Science and Information Technology of Calicut University at Muttil offers MCA (Master of Computer Application) course
10. B.Ed. Centre of Calicut University is situated at Kaniyambetta (10 km from Kalpetta)
11. Fatima Mata Nursing School, Kalpetta
12. Government Polytechnic College, Meppadi
13. KMM Government ITI, Kalpetta
14. Face Psycho Clinic and Training Centre (functioning inside Shanthi Pain & Palliative Care Society building) offers Calicut University's Diploma Course in Psychological Counseling

== Arts and science colleges ==
1. NMSM Government College, Kalpetta (Neelikandy Moideen Sahib Memorial)
2. WMO Arts & Science College, Muttil
3. Green Mount Arts & Science College, Padinjarethara
4. PM Charitable Trust, Arts & Science College, Meppadi

== Schools ==
1. Kendriya Vidyalaya, Kalpetta
2. WMO English Academy, Muttil
3. SKMJ Higher Secondary School, Kalpetta
4. NSS English Medium School, Kalpetta
5. De Paul Public School, Kalpetta
6. MCF Public School, Kalpetta
7. St Joseph's Convent School, Kalpetta
8. Government Higher Secondary School, Munderi, Kalpetta
9. HIM UP School, Kalpetta
10. Government LP School, Kalpetta
11. SDM LP School, Kalpetta
12. Al Falah English Medium School, Kalpetta
13. Kristhuraja Public School, Vellaramkunnu
14. KeyPees International School, Ootty Road, Kunnumbetta
