= Education in Wayanad =

Educational Organizations in Wayanad are located mainly in Kalpetta and Sultan Bathery.

== Education in Sulthan Bathery ==
Many educational institutions including schools, colleges, industrial training centers and teacher training institutes exist in Sulthan Bathery. Wayanad is a single Education District with one Deputy Director of Education, one District Educational Officer (DEO) and three Assistant Educational Officers (AEO). Sulthan Bathery taluk is under one AEO. Wayanad District Institute of Education and Training (DIET) is located at Sulthan Bathery. It is one of the three DIETs established in Kerala in the first phase in 1989. Apart from providing teacher education, its activities include academic research and innovations, academic monitoring of schools and material production.

== School Education ==
Many government, aided and unaided schools exist in Sulthan Bathery. They come under different boards of education such as Kerala State Education Board and Central Board of Secondary Education. Some of the schools which follow the state syllabus are listed below:

== List of Schools ==
=== Schools ===
St. Joseph's Higher Secondary School, Sultan Bathery

Established in 1977, this private, co-educational institution is affiliated with the Kerala State Education Board. It is recognized as the first certified English-medium school in Wayanad and offers classes from Grade 1 to 12. The school features computer-aided learning, a library, and sports facilities.

St. Mary's College Higher Secondary School, Kuppadi

An aided, co-educational institution affiliated with the Kerala State Education Board, managed by the Malankara Orthodox Syrian Church. It provides education for Grades 8 to 12 and emphasizes academic excellence.

Government High School, Kuppadi

One of the oldest government schools in the region, it is co-educational and affiliated with the Kerala State Education Board. The school offers classes from Grade 5 to 10 and promotes co-curricular engagement.

Ideal English School, Sultan Bathery

A private, co-educational CBSE-affiliated school offering education from Kindergarten to Grade 12. It focuses on modern teaching methodologies and overall student development, supported by modern infrastructure.

McLeod's English School, Sultan Bathery

A CBSE-affiliated private school offering a balanced curriculum for Kindergarten through Grade 12. The school emphasizes strong foundational learning and a nurturing environment.

Green Hills Public School, Moolankavu

Located near Sultan Bathery, this private CBSE school is known for its serene campus and emphasis on academics and extracurricular activities. It serves students from Kindergarten to Grade 12.

WMO English School, Sultan Bathery

Managed by the Wayanad Muslim Orphanage, this CBSE-affiliated school provides Kindergarten to Grade 12 education, focusing on academic excellence and moral education. The school supports underprivileged students through scholarships.

Bhavan's Vidya Mandir, Vidyanagar

Affiliated with CBSE, this private co-educational institution is part of the Bharatiya Vidya Bhavan network. It integrates Indian culture and values into academics and offers various extracurricular activities.

Nirmala Matha Public School, Kuppadi

A CBSE-affiliated institution managed by the Malankara Orthodox Syrian Church, offering education from Kindergarten to Grade 12. It emphasizes character building and holistic education with modern infrastructure.

Sarvajana Government Vocational Higher Secondary School, Sultan Bathery

A government-run school affiliated with the Kerala State Education Board. It offers vocational courses for students in Grades 11 and 12, along with regular academics, aiming to develop practical job-oriented skills.

- Government High Schools
  - Sarvajana GVHSS, Sulthan Bathery
  - Moolankavu GHSS, Moolankavu
  - GVHS&THS, Sulthan Bathery
  - Government High School, Kuppady
- Private Aided High Schools
  - Assumption HS, Sulthan Bathery
  - St. Mary's College HSS, Kuppady
- Vijaya Higher Secondary School, Pulpally
- Private Unaided High Schools
  - St. Joseph's Higher Secondary School, Sulthan Bathery
  - WMO English High school, Sulthan Bathery
  - Ideal English School, Sulthan Bathery
  - Bhavans Vidya Mandir, Sulthan Bathery
  - Green hills public school Moolankavu
  - Nirmala Matha Public school, Kuppadi
  - MC Lords English School Poomala
  - Hill Blooms School, Mananthavady

== College Education ==
Compared to other districts of Kerala, institutions offering higher education are limited in Wayanad. One of the oldest colleges in Wayanad is St. Mary's College, Sulthan Bathery, established in 1965. This arts and science college is affiliated to University of Calicut. Another arts and science college located here is Don Bosco College. Pazhassi Raja College, Pulpally, established in 1982, is another major college located nearby. Government Engineering College located at Mananthavady is the nearest engineering college. It is affiliated to Kannur University.

Two nursing colleges located at Sulthan Bathery are Assumption School of Nursing and Vinayaka Hospital College of Nursing.

=== Colleges ===
St. Mary's College, Sultan Bathery

Established in 1965 by Rev. Fr. Mathai Nooranal of the Malankara Orthodox Syrian Church, it was the first higher education college in Wayanad. Located in Kuppadi hills, the college operates on a 32-acre campus and offers 11 undergraduate and 10 postgraduate programs, along with four research centers. It is affiliated with the University of Calicut.

Don Bosco College, Sultan Bathery

This self-financing arts and science college is managed by the Salesians of Don Bosco and affiliated with the University of Calicut. It offers a range of undergraduate and postgraduate programs.

Alphonsa Arts and Science College

Situated on Ooty Road, this college offers undergraduate programs in multiple disciplines. It is affiliated with the University of Calicut and known for its focus on quality education.

Mar Baselios College of Education

A teacher education college run by the Catholic Diocese of Bathery. It offers two-year Bachelor of Education (B.Ed.) and Diploma in Education (D.Ed./TTC) programs. The institution is self-financed and focuses on training future educators.

=== Vocational and Technical Institutions ===
Aitecc ITI

An Industrial Training Institute offering technical courses designed to develop industry-relevant skills among students. It plays a role in supporting youth employment through vocational education.

Government ITI, Sultan Bathery

Provides vocational training in multiple trades. This government institute enhances employability among students through practical training programs.

Government Polytechnic College, Sultan Bathery

Offers diploma-level education in engineering and applied sciences. It serves students pursuing careers in technical and industrial fields.

Government Polytechnic College, Meenangadi

Located nearby, this institution provides specialized diploma programs in various engineering disciplines.

Government Polytechnic College, Dwaraka, Mananthavady

Another polytechnic institution in Wayanad district, offering diploma courses in technical streams to students from the northern regions, including Sultan Bathery.

Vinayaka College of Nursing

This institution provides nursing education aligned with the healthcare industry’s needs. It offers programs that prepare students for careers in clinical and community health services.

== Other Educational Institutions ==
A few distance education centers also exist in the town of Sulthan Bathery. St. Mary's College IGNOU study center offers programs such as Post Graduate Diploma in Rural Development, Post Graduate Diploma in Environmental and Sustainable Development, Diploma in Tourism Studies etc. Another IGNOU study center is at Data Point Computer Academy. It offers programs such as Master of Computer Applications (MCA) and Certificate in Computing (CIC).

Many Teacher Training Colleges (TTC) too are present in Sulthan Bathery. Some of them are Mar Baselios Teacher Training Institute, Valummel Teacher Training Institute, Moolankave and St. George Teacher Training Institute, Pulpally.

Apart from these, some special schools for mentally challenged like St. Gregorios Special School for Mentally Challenged, Kottakkunnu and Mercy Home Sacred Heart Special School for Mentally Retarded exist in Sulthan Bathery. The former is managed by Malankara Orthodox Syrian Church Bathery diocese while the latter is under the District Educational Officer, Wayanad. Other unaided special schools include St. Rossolo's HS for the Deaf, Poomala and WO Blind and Deaf school, Muttil.

== Education in Kalpetta ==
=== University ===
1. Kerala Veterinary and Animal Sciences University, Pookode (14 km from Kalpetta)

== Professional Education ==
1. College of Veterinary and Animal Sciences at Pookode (14 km from Kalpetta)
2. Oriental School of Hotel Management located at Lakkidi (15 km from Kalpetta)
3. Oriental College of Hotel Management and Culinary Arts at Vythiri (8 km from Kalpetta)
4. DM WIMS Medical College located at Meppadi (15 km) is the only Medical College in Wayanad district
5. College of Dairy Science and Technology, Pookode offers B.Tech degree course in Dairy Science & Technology
6. Oriental Institute for Management Studies, Vythiri
7. College of Engineering, Thalapuzha, Wayanad
8. DM WIMS Nursing College located at Meppadi
9. Centre for Computer Science and Information Technology of Calicut University at Muttil offers MCA (Master of Computer Application) course
10. B.Ed Centre of Calicut University is situated at Kaniyambetta (10 km from Kalpetta)
11. Fatima Mata Nursing School, Kalpetta
12. Government Polytechnic College, Meppadi
13. KMM Government ITI, Kalpetta
14. Face Psycho Clinic and Training Centre (functioning inside Shanthi Pain & Palliative Care Society building) offers Calicut University's Diploma Course in Psychological Counseling

== Arts and Science Colleges ==
1. Pazhassiraja College, Pulpally 2.[NMSM Government College, Kalpetta]] 3. WMO Arts & Science College, Muttil 4. Green Mount Arts & Science College, Padinjarethara 5. PM Charitable Trust, Arts & Science College, Meppadi

== Schools ==
1. Kendriya Vidyalaya, Kalpetta
2. WMO English Academy, Muttil
3. SKMJ Higher Secondary School, Kalpetta
4. NSS English Medium School, Kalpetta
5. De Paul Public School, Kalpetta
6. MCF Public School, Kalpetta
7. St Joseph's Convent School, Kalpetta
8. Government Higher Secondary School, Munderi, Kalpetta
9. Al Falah English Medium School, Kalpetta
10. Kristhuraja Public School, Vellaramkunnu
11. KeyPees International School, Ootty Road, Kunnumbetta
12. Vijaya Higher Secondary School, Pulpally
13. Vijaya L.P School, Pulpally
