= College of Veterinary and Animal Sciences, Mannuthy =

Indian veterinary college

College of Veterinary and Animal Sciences
- Established: 1955
- Affiliations: Kerala Veterinary and Animal Sciences University
- Dean: Dr. Ally K.
- Location: Thrissur, Kerala, India; 10.5306°N 76.2589°E
- Website: http://www.kvasu.ac.in/

College of Veterinary and Animal Sciences is a veterinary college located at Mannuthy, Thrissur city of the Indian state of Kerala. The college is part of Kerala Veterinary and Animal Sciences University.

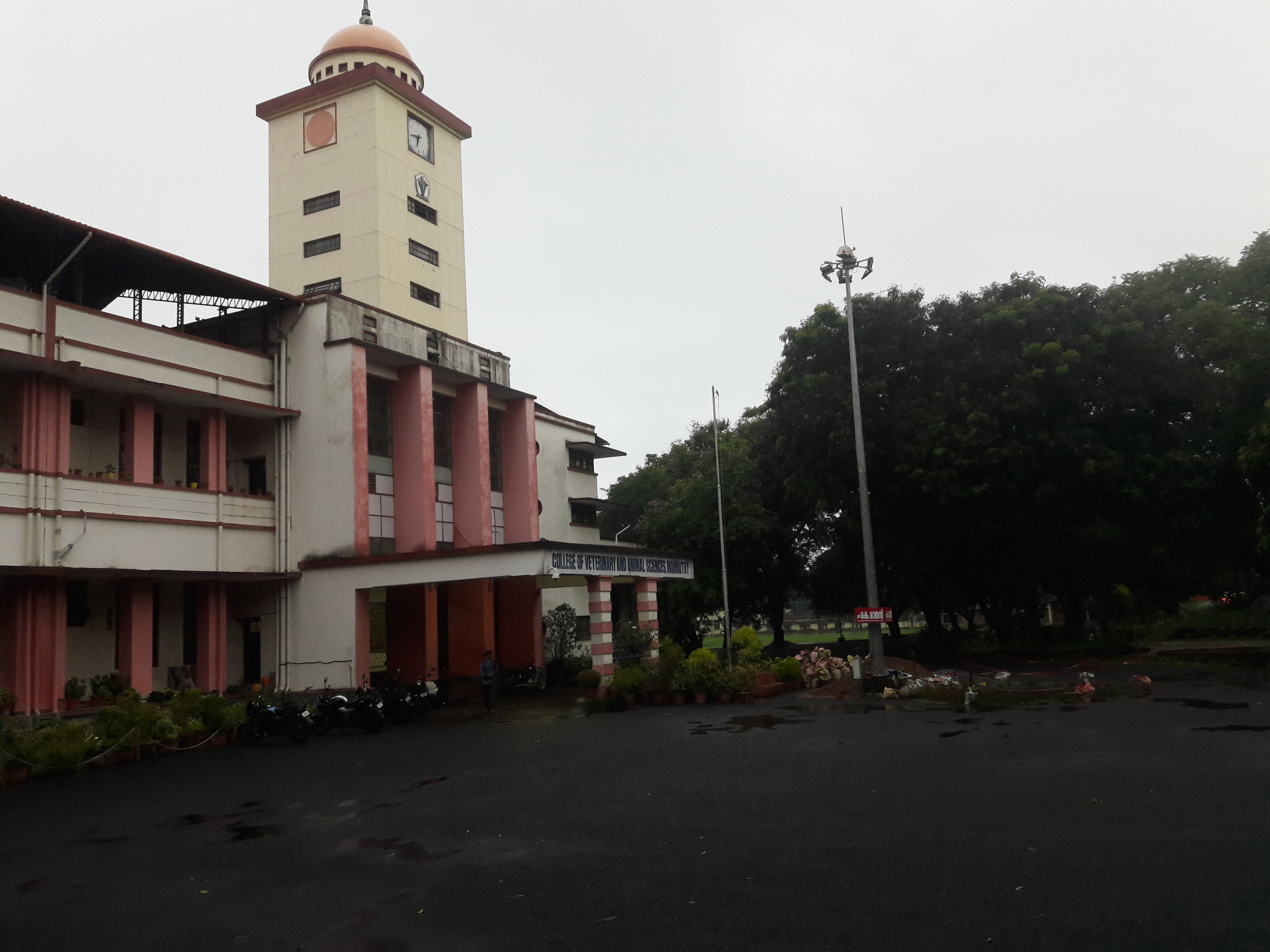

== History ==
The college came into existence in 1955 as Government Veterinary College. Initially, the college was affiliated to Kerala University. It switched to Calicut University in 1966. It was later renamed Kerala Veterinary College and Research Institute. When Kerala Agricultural University was formed in February 1972, the college was transferred to it and was renamed the College of Veterinary and Animal Sciences.

On 12 June 2010 a new university exclusively for veterinary science was created by ordinance on the campus of the College of Veterinary and Animal Sciences, Pookode, near Vythiri, in Wayanad district. According to the Ordinance, the proposed university would have the jurisdiction of the entire state.

The Mannuthy Veterinary College and its 400 acres of campus, the Pookode Veterinary College and its 90 acres of campus, the veterinary clinical complex of the Pookode Veterinary College, College of Dairy Science Technology, Mannuthy, Livestock Research Station in Palakkad and its 400 acres of campus, dairy farm at Kolahalamedu in Idukki, various farms in Mannuthy, the cattle infertility centre in Kozhikode and the Veterinary Hospital in Thrissur, cattle breeding farm at Thumboormuzhy, is handed over to the university. The Government of Kerala established India's first exclusive hospital for elephants there.

== Academic Courses Offered ==
- UG Courses
- PG Courses
- Doctorate Courses
- PG Certificate Courses
- PG Diploma Courses
- Diploma
- Technology Enabled Distance Learning
- Externship

== See also ==
- Kerala Agricultural University
- Kerala Veterinary and Animal Sciences University
