= Valal =

Vellamunda

Valal is a small village in Kottathara panchayath of Vythiri taluk, Wayanad district in Kerala, India. The majority of people are farmers. The village has a UP school namely AUPS Valal and an Aganwadi of ICDS Project, a primary health centre, a ration shop, a post box and library.
