= Pethia pookodensis =

Conservation status
- Critically Endangered (IUCN 3.1)

Scientific classification
- Kingdom: Animalia
- Phylum: Chordata
- Class: Actinopterygii
- Order: Cypriniformes
- Family: Cyprinidae
- Subfamily: Smiliogastrinae
- Genus: Pethia
- Species: P. pookodensis

Binomial name
- Pethia pookodensis (Mercy & Eapen, 2007)

Synonyms
- Puntius pookodensis Mercy & Eapen, 2007

Species of fish

Pethia pookodensis, the Pookode Lake barb, is a species of cyprinid fish found in Kerala, India where it is only known to occur in Pookode Lake in the Western Ghats. This species can reach a length of 4.3 centimetres (1.7 in) SL. The high level of tourism around the lake poses serious threats to its ecosystem.
