= Pookode =

- Village
- Pookode Lake

- Location in Kerala, India Pookode (India)
- Coordinates: 11°32′2″N 76°1′29″E
- Country: India
- State: Kerala
- District: Wayanad

Languages
  - Official: Malayalam, English
- Time zone: UTC+5:30 (IST)
- PIN: 673 576
- Telephone code: 914936
- Vehicle registration: KL-12
- Lok Sabha constituency: Wayanad
- Vidhan Sabha constituency: Kalpetta
- Nearest city: Kalpetta

Pookode is a village in Vythiri Taluk in Wayanad district of Kerala state in India. Pookode is known for Pookode Lake and as the headquarters of Kerala Veterinary and Animal Sciences University.

== Geography ==
Pookode is situated in the south west region of Wayanad district, about 14 km away from district headquarters Kalpetta. It lies on the Kozhikode-Mysore National Highway NH 766 (Old NH 212) between Kozhikode and Kalpetta. Pookode is 58 km from Kozhikode and is adjacent to the gateway of Wayanad, Lakkidi. Next to Pookode on the NH766 is Vythiri town.

== Transport ==
Pookode is well connected by road. Frequent buses are available from Kozhikode and Kalpetta.

Nearest railway station is Kozhikode at a distance of 58 km.

Calicut International Airport at Karipur is located 86 km away from Pookode.

== Education ==
The main campus of the Kerala Veterinary and Animal Sciences University is located at Pookode. Apart from the administrative offices of the university, two constituent colleges of the university function inside of this campus:

1. College of Veterinary and Animal Sciences, Pookode
2. College of Dairy Science and Technology, Pookode

The Jawahar Navodaya Vidyalaya of Wayanad is situated next to the campus of Veterinary University campus in Pookode.

Dr. B.R. Ambedkar Memorial Model Residential School is also situated near the Veterinary University campus.

== Gallery ==
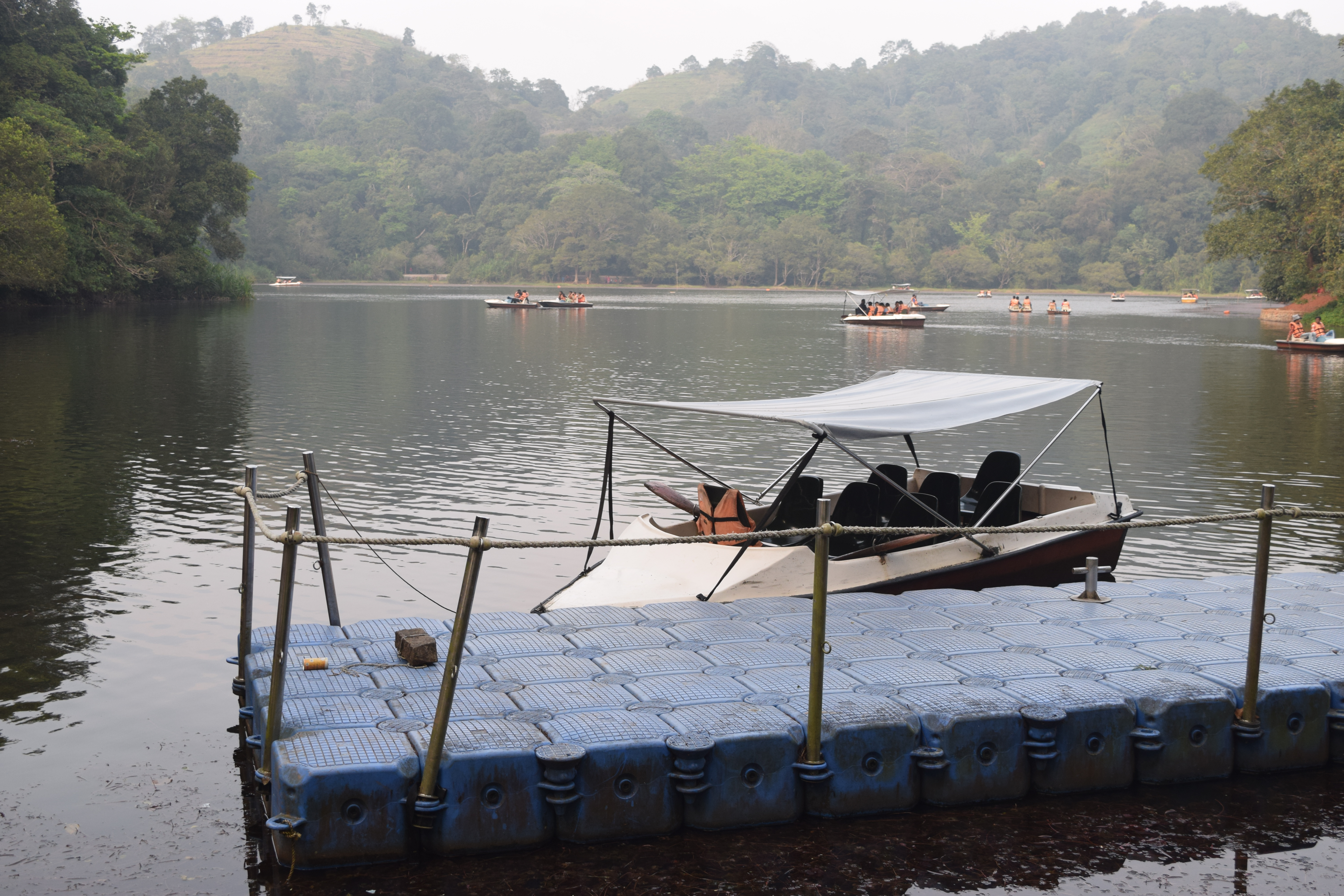
Pookode Lake Boating

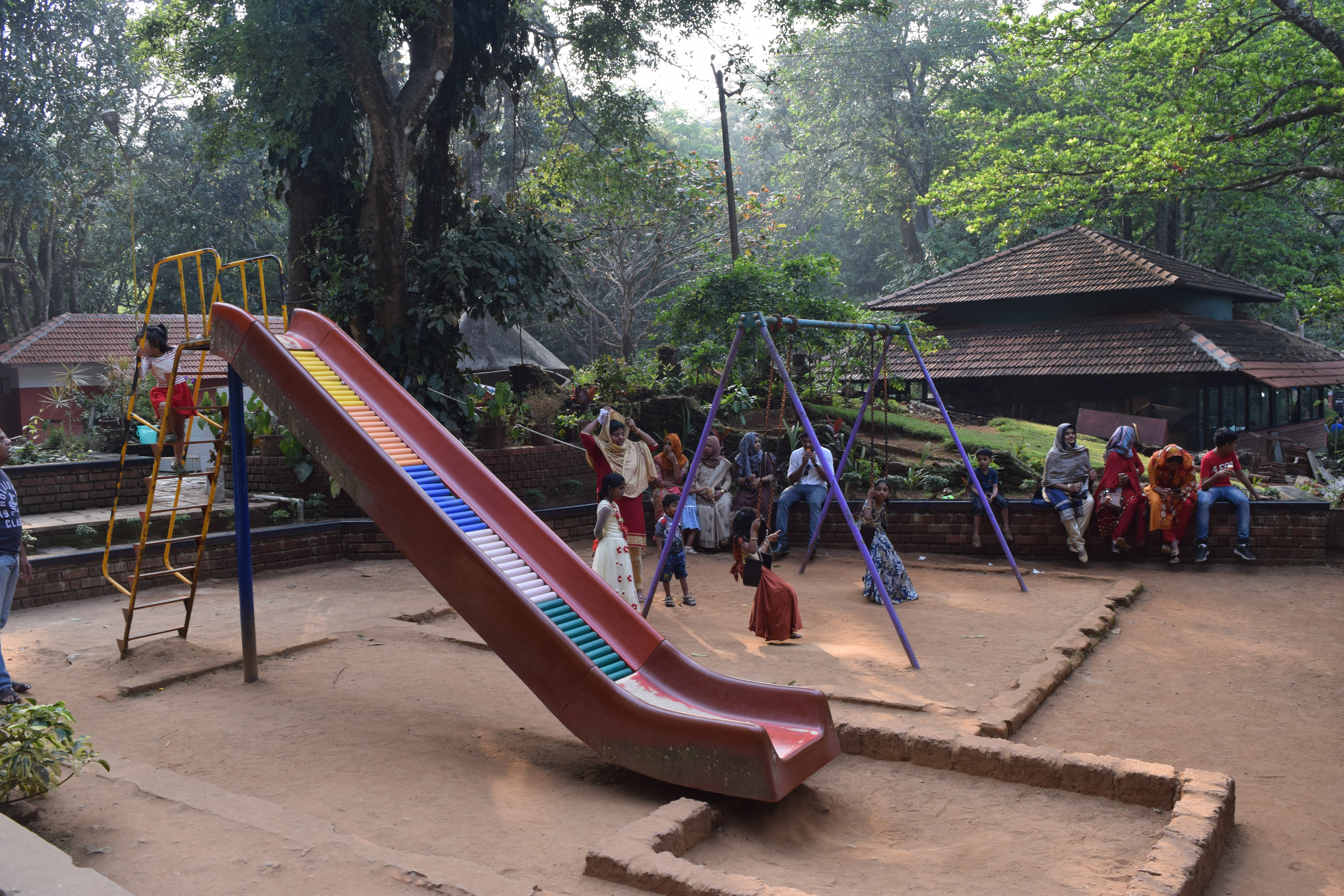
Children's Park near Pookode Lake

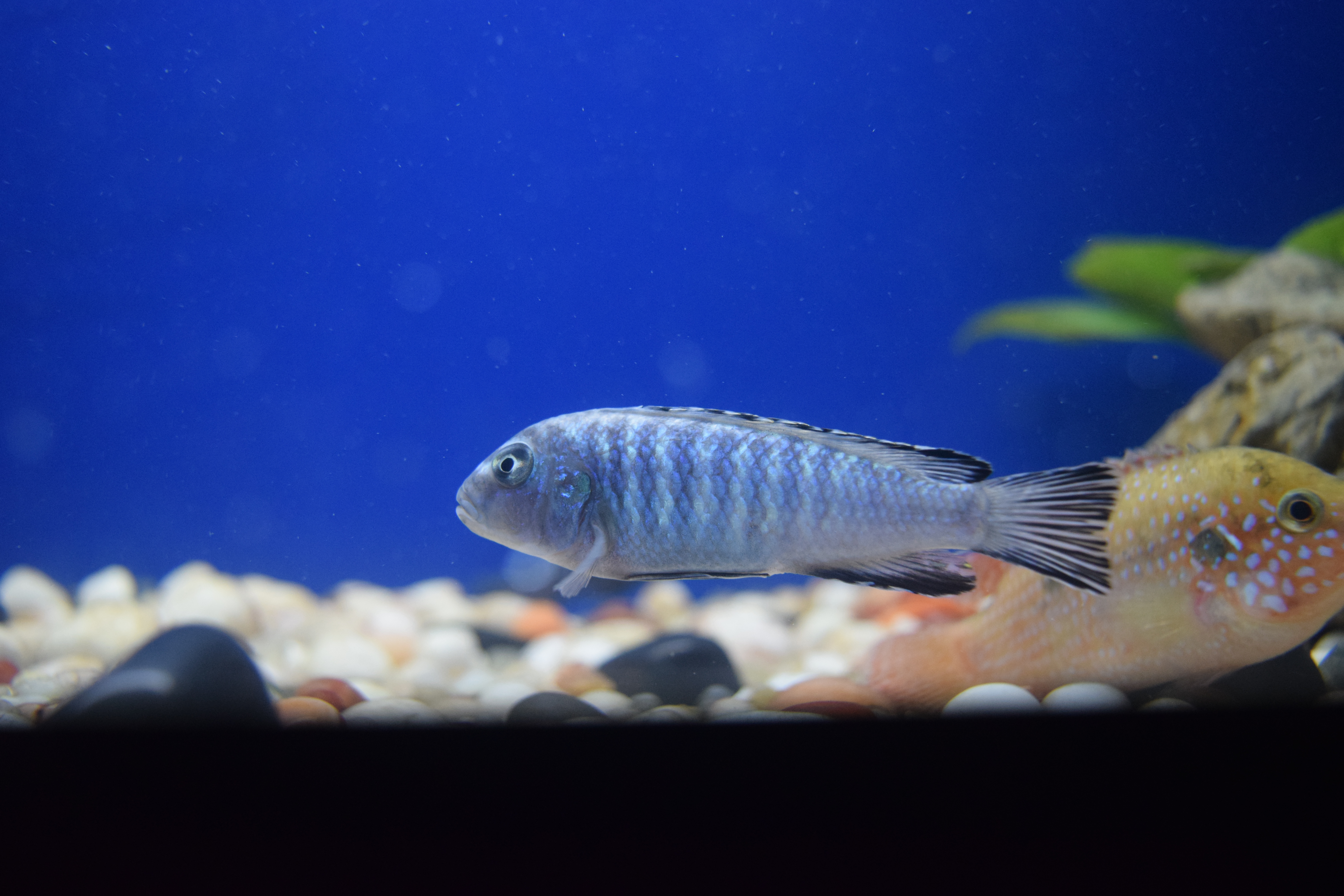
A view from Lake Aquarium

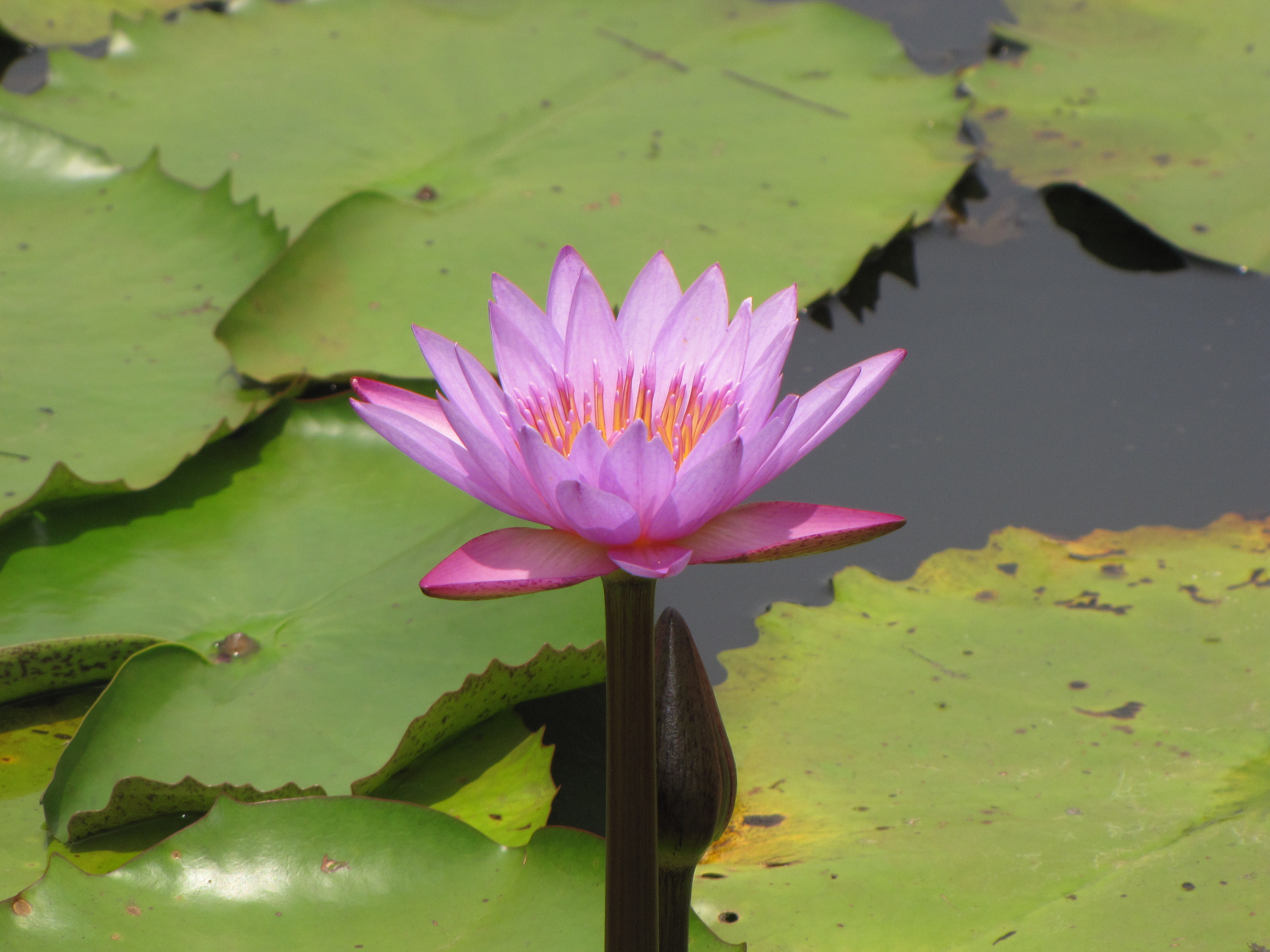
Water lilies at Pookode Lake

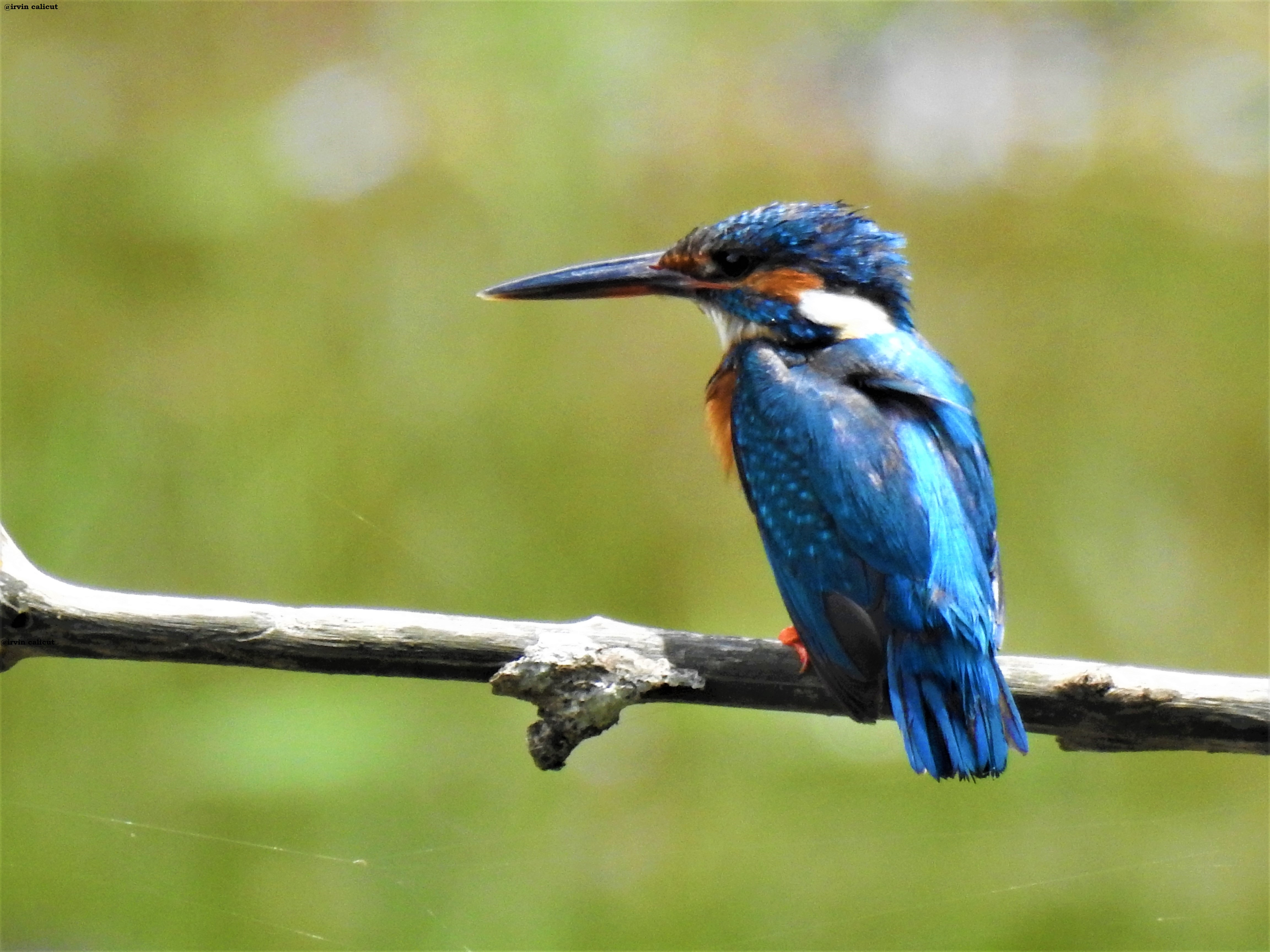
Kingfisher Attraction

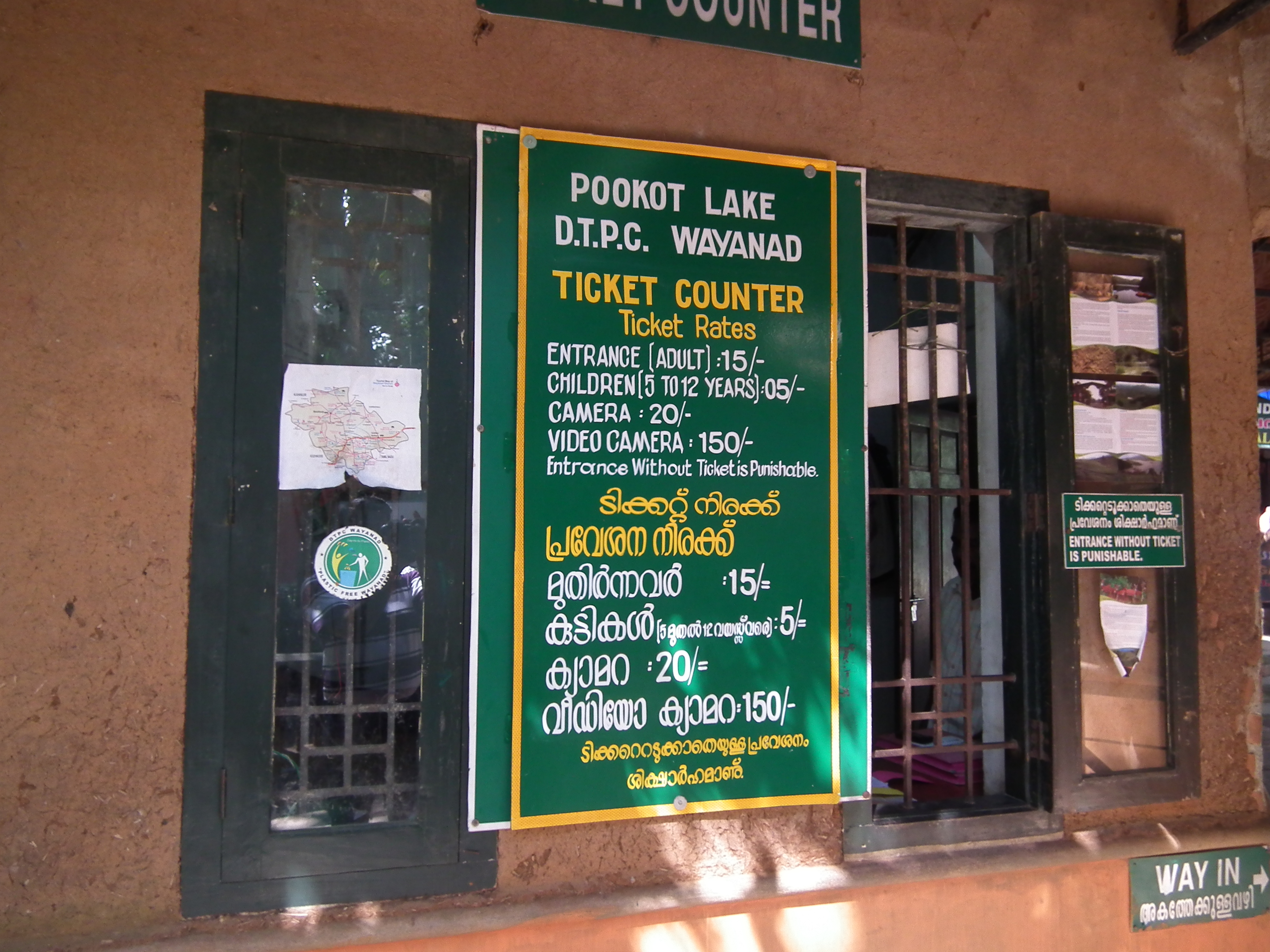
Ticket Counter
