= Lakkidi, Wayanad =

Village in Kerala, India

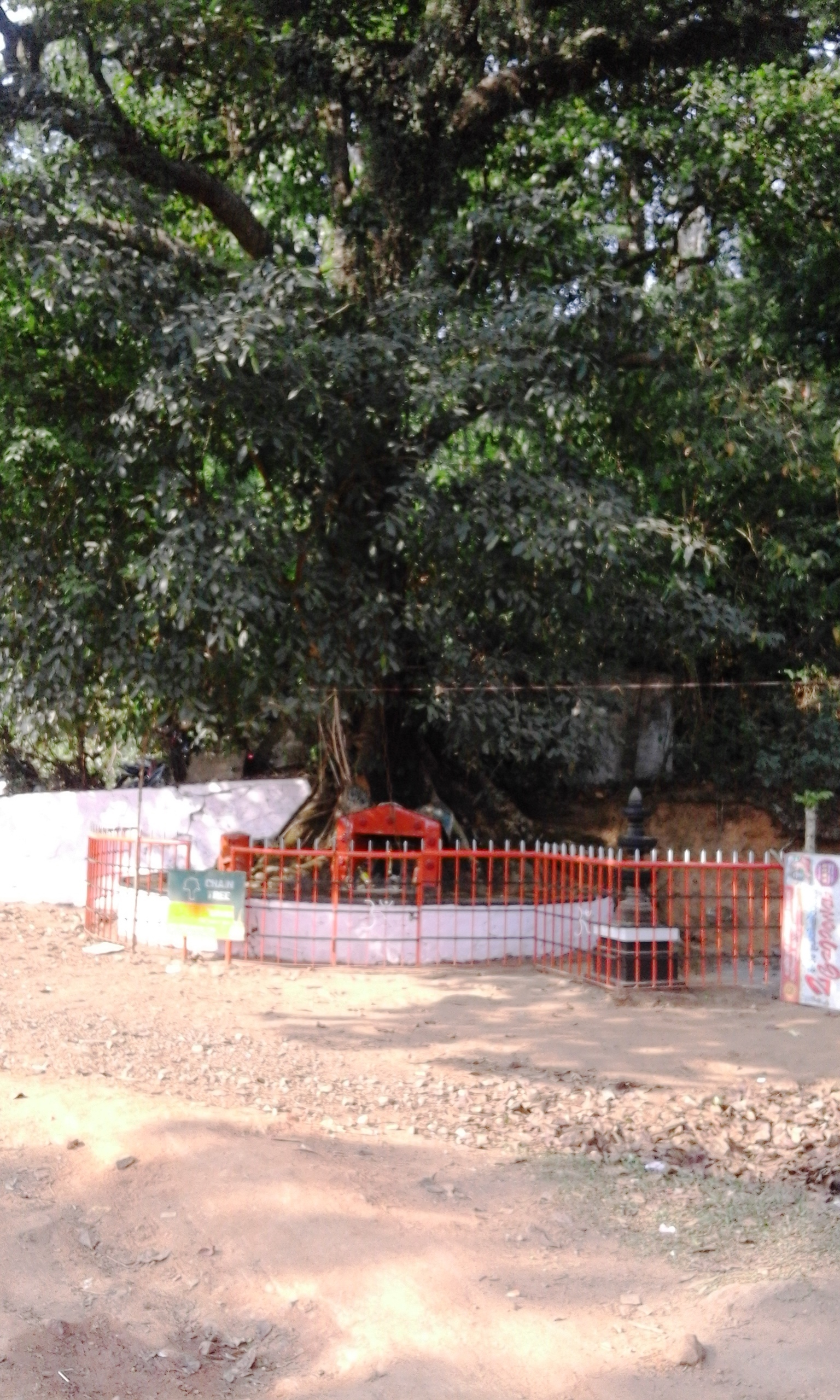
The Chain Tree at Lakkidi

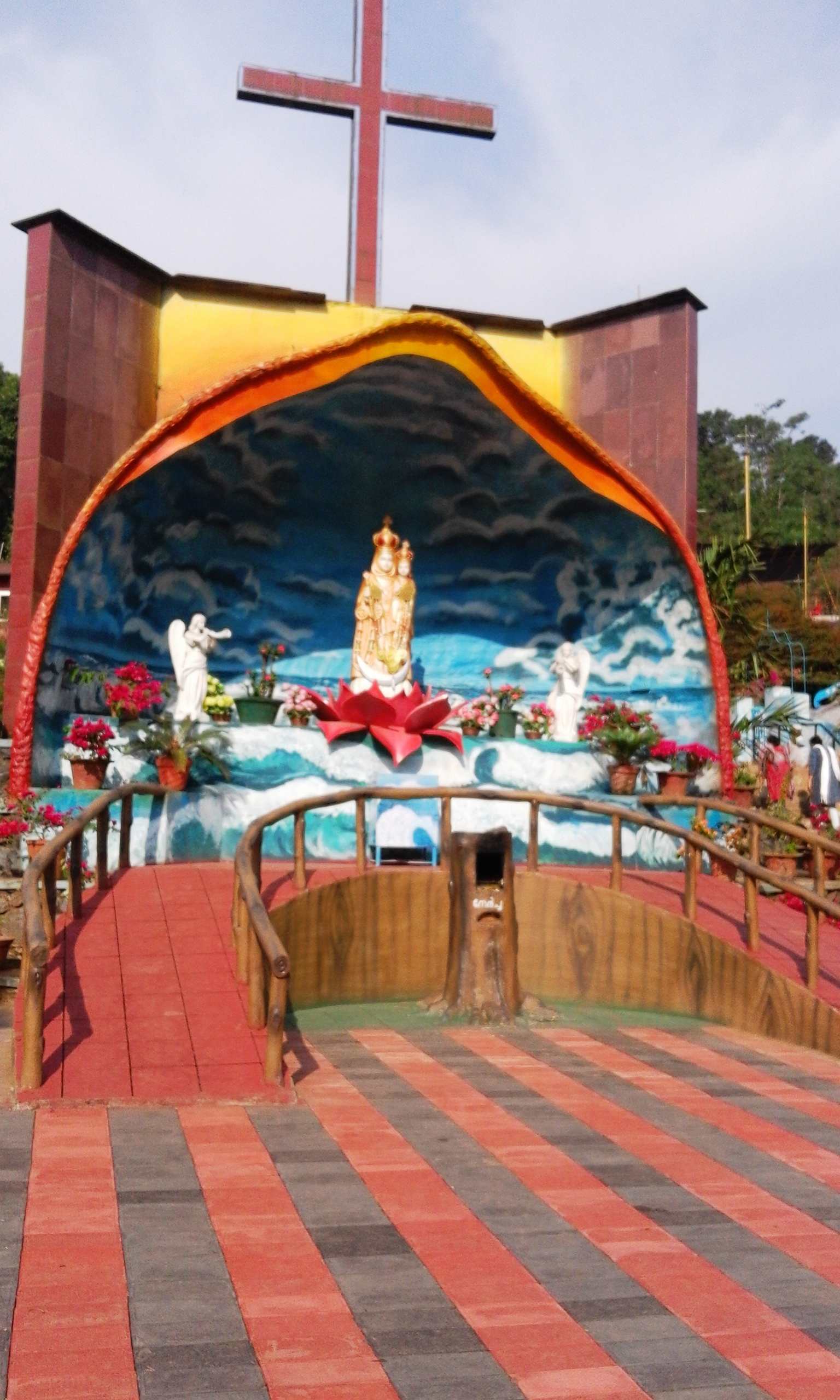
Lakkidi Church

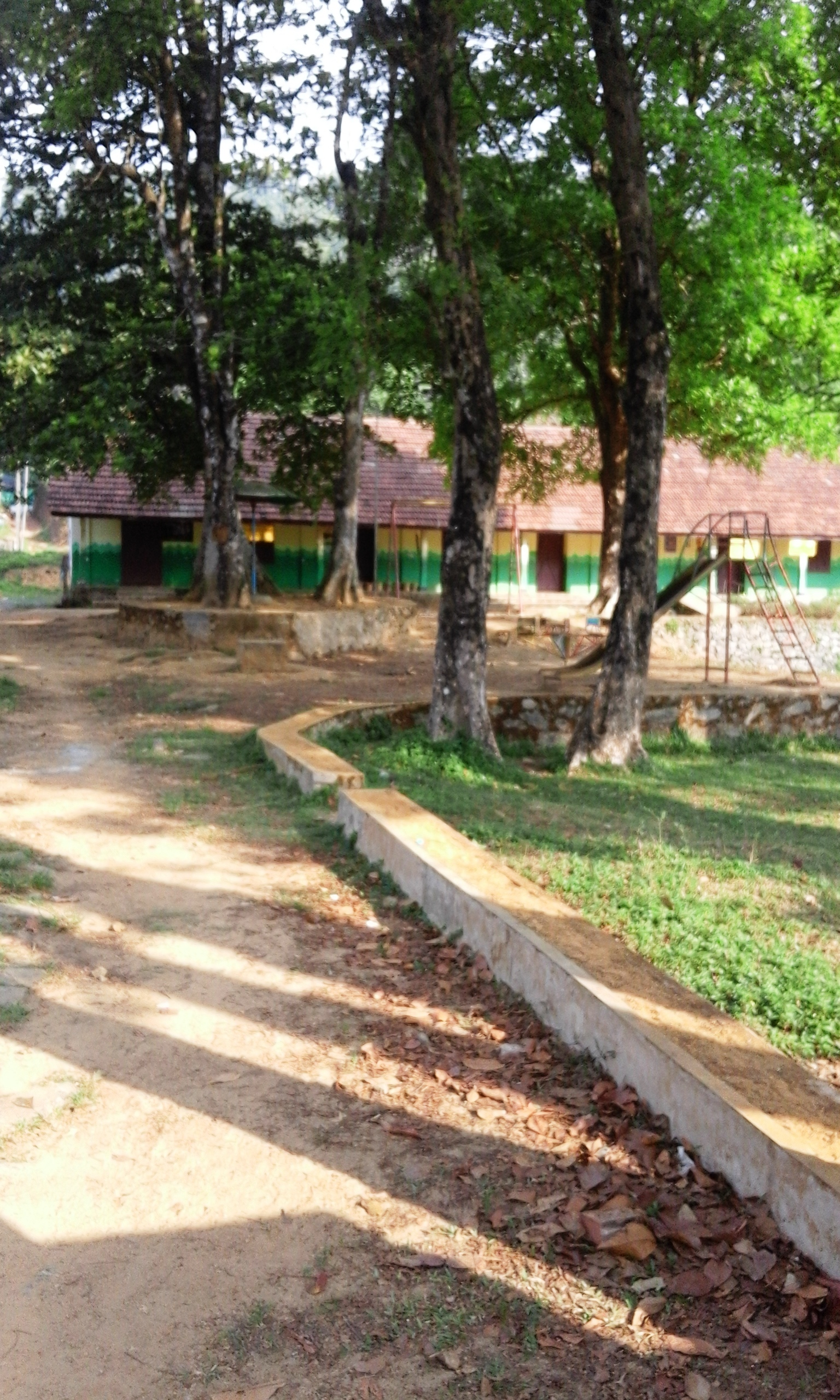
Lakkidi school

Lakkidi is a village and rain forest located in a gateway of the Wayanad district of the Indian state of Kerala. During British Raj, a horse track in Wayanad attracted European investors and traders. They cultivated Malabar pepper, spices, tea, and coffee. National Highway 766 connects Kozhikode in Kerala with Kollegal in Karnataka via Mysore, creating business opportunities in tourism and agriculture. Lakkidi is surrounded by a biodiverse environment and unspoiled nature which attracts visitors interested in bird-watching, trekking, and off-roading. Jawahar Navodaya Vidyalaya is situated there.

== Geography ==
Lakkidi is situated at one of the highest locations in Wayanad, 700 metres (2,300 ft) above mean sea level, above Thamarassery ghat pass. Vythiri is the nearest town, 5 km from Lakkidi. Chain tree, Pookot Lake and a mile-long viewing side-walk are within five km.

Pookot Lake is 3 km away from Lakkidi. It is a rain-fed lake spread across 15 acres. It is one of the few fresh-water reservoirs in Wayanad. It is surrounded by meadows and hills, and is a picnic spot. Annual rainfall here averages up to 600–650 cm causing seasonal floods downstream of rivers flowing east. Many species are found in this bio-reserve park including lion-tailed macaques, flying squirrels, buffalo, babblers, and rare water-birds like Indian Shag (Phalacrocorase fuscicollis), Little Cormorant (Phalacrocorax niger), Little Green Heron (Ardeola striatus), and Pond Heron (Ardeola grayii).

Lakkidi has rich soil that supports the farming of coffee, tea, orange and pepper, cardamom and ginger. It receives the highest mean annual rainfall in excess of 3000 mm in Wayanad and laterite, forest loamy and brown hydromorphic soil here retains moisture around the year.

== Karinthandan yatra ==
Karinthandan, the local chieftain of Paniyas, one of the tribes of Wayanad district, lived in the foothills of Lakkidi between 1700 and 1750 AD. A British engineer observed him waling uphill along a secret forest path, The engineer approached him to show the way through the thick forest towards the Kingdom of Mysore. This came to be known as the Thamarassery-Wayanad Ghat route. Once the engineer found his way, he killed the chieftain so that he could claim the recognition for finding this route. Years later, Karinthandan's ghost started haunting every passer-by appearing as a phantom figure and screaming threats, travellers were scared and met with fatal accidents and the whole region was haunted by the troubled spirit. Scared and desperate, the tribal people and traders asked a witch doctor to help them. He exorcised the spirit and cast a spell to get rid of its evil powers. He tied the imprisoned soul within a huge tree using an iron chain. This tree and chain are near the highway at Lakkidi, and have become a pilgrim spot and tourist attraction.

PEEP Wayanad, an NGO working there since 2005, organises an annual yatra (walkathon) to commemorate Karinthandan's martyrdom on the second Sunday of March. As a part of this yatra, essay competitions and sports events are held to encourage tribal youth to join the mainstream. PEEP is promoted by Kerala Vanavasi Vikasa Kendram. Its founders are Shri S. Ramanunni, Sri.M P Padmanabhan, Sri. E K Soman, Dr P Rajesh and Sri. T V Raghavan. PEEP, along with Paniya folk, has urged the government to install a statue of Karinthandan near the 'chain tree' and name the ghat road as Karinthandan memorial ghat road.

== Climate ==
Rains start in May and end in December. Due to the rainfall and beauty, it is often called "Chirapunjee of Kerala". Average rainfall ranges from 600 to 650 cm or above. It experiences chilly climate throughout the year with mist and fog. It is said to be the coldest place in Wayanad district as well as one of the coldest in Kerala. It enjoys koppen highland climate. Generally, monsoon comes with torrential rainfall and windy weather.

Average Rainfall
Month	Jan.	Feb.	Mar.	Apr.	May	Jun.	Jul.	Aug.	Sep.	Oct.	Nov.	Dec.
High temp	17	20	21	22	25	23	21	20	20	19	18	18
Low temp	6	10	13	15	17	16	15	14	12	11	10	8

Lakkidi experiences warm climate from March–May and cold climate from October to January.

== Transport ==
From Kozhikode: Thamarassery–Lakkidi Ghat road, part of NH 212, connects Kozhikkode and the rest of Kerala, south of Kozhikkode with Wayanad.
