= Pookode Lake =

Lake in Kerala, India

- Location within Kerala
- Location: Pookode, Wayanad District, Kerala
- Coordinates: 11°32′33″N 76°01′38″E
- Basin countries: India
- Surface area: 13 acres (5.3 ha)
- Average depth: 40 metres (130 ft)
- Surface elevation: 2,100 metres (6,900 ft)
- Website: http://wayanadtourism.org/explore

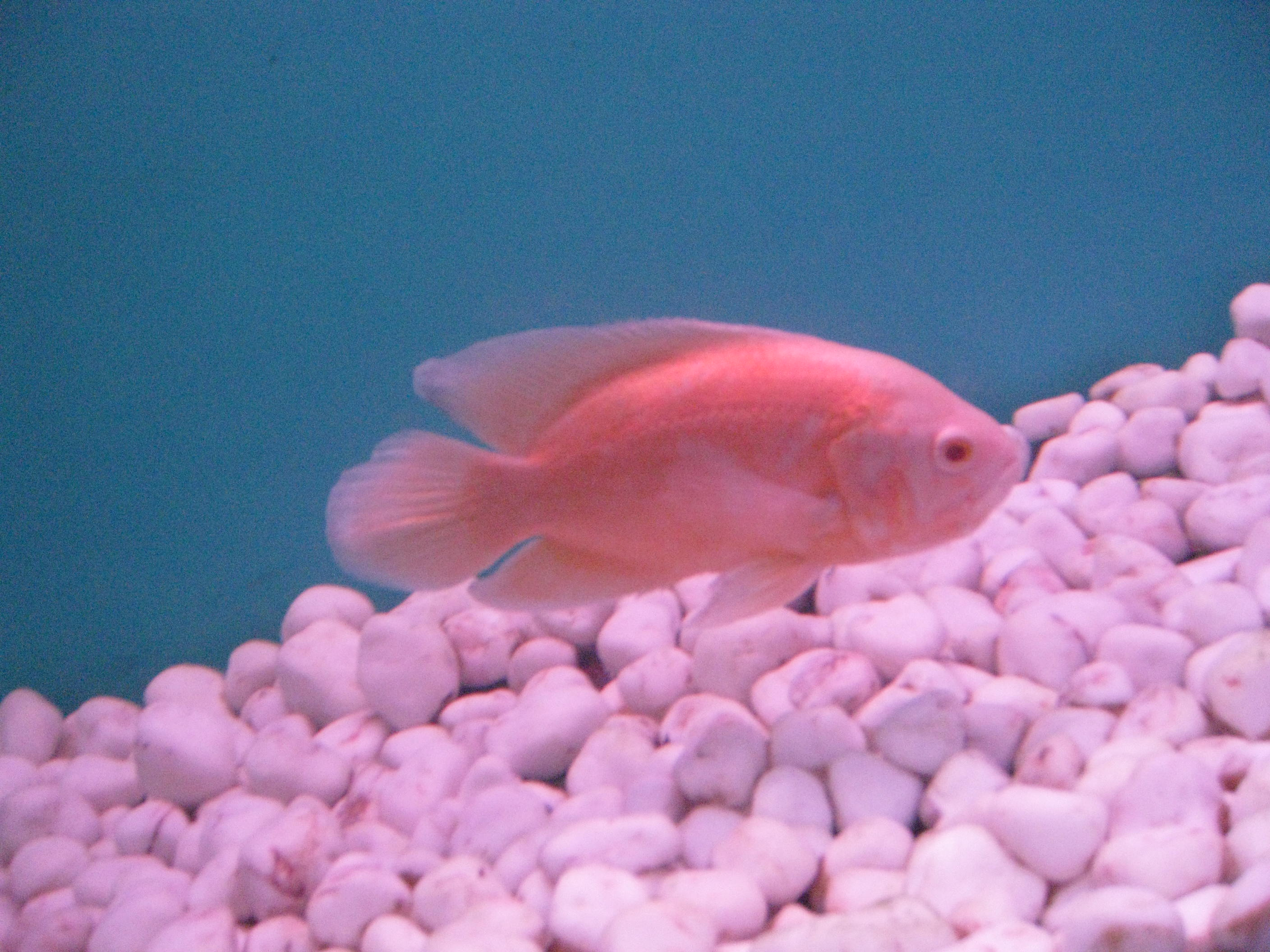
Hatchery at Pookode Lake

Pookode Lake is a scenic freshwater lake in the Wayanad district in Kerala, South India. A major tourist destination in the district, Pookode is a natural freshwater lake nestling amid evergreen forests and mountain slopes at an elevation of 770 meters above sea level. It is 15 km away from Kalpetta. It is the smallest and highest elevation freshwater lake in Kerala.

== Origin ==
Panamaram, the rivulet which ultimately becomes Kabani River, originates from Pookode Lake. It is spread across an area of 8.5 hectares and with a maximum depth of 6.5 metres. Lying 3 km south of Vythiri town, the lake is one of the most popular tourist spots in Wayanad.

== Features ==
The lake has the natural shape of India's map in aerial view. This perennial fresh water lake, nestled among wooded hills, is only one of its kind in Kerala. Pethia pookodensis, is a species of cyprinid fish known to occur only in Pookode Lake. The lake has abundance of blue lotus and fresh water fishes. Boating facilities are also there. The forests surrounding the lake hold many wild animals, birds and flies. There are groups of Blue water lily flowers scattered here and there in the lake. In the entrance there is a handicraft shop where you can buy everything like handmade soap, Ayurvedic medicinal products, crafts etc.

== Administration ==
The lake is under the South Wayanad forest division and run by District Tourism promotion council. Boating facilities, children's park, handicrafts and spices emporium and fresh water aquarium are among the tourist attractions here.

== Gallery ==
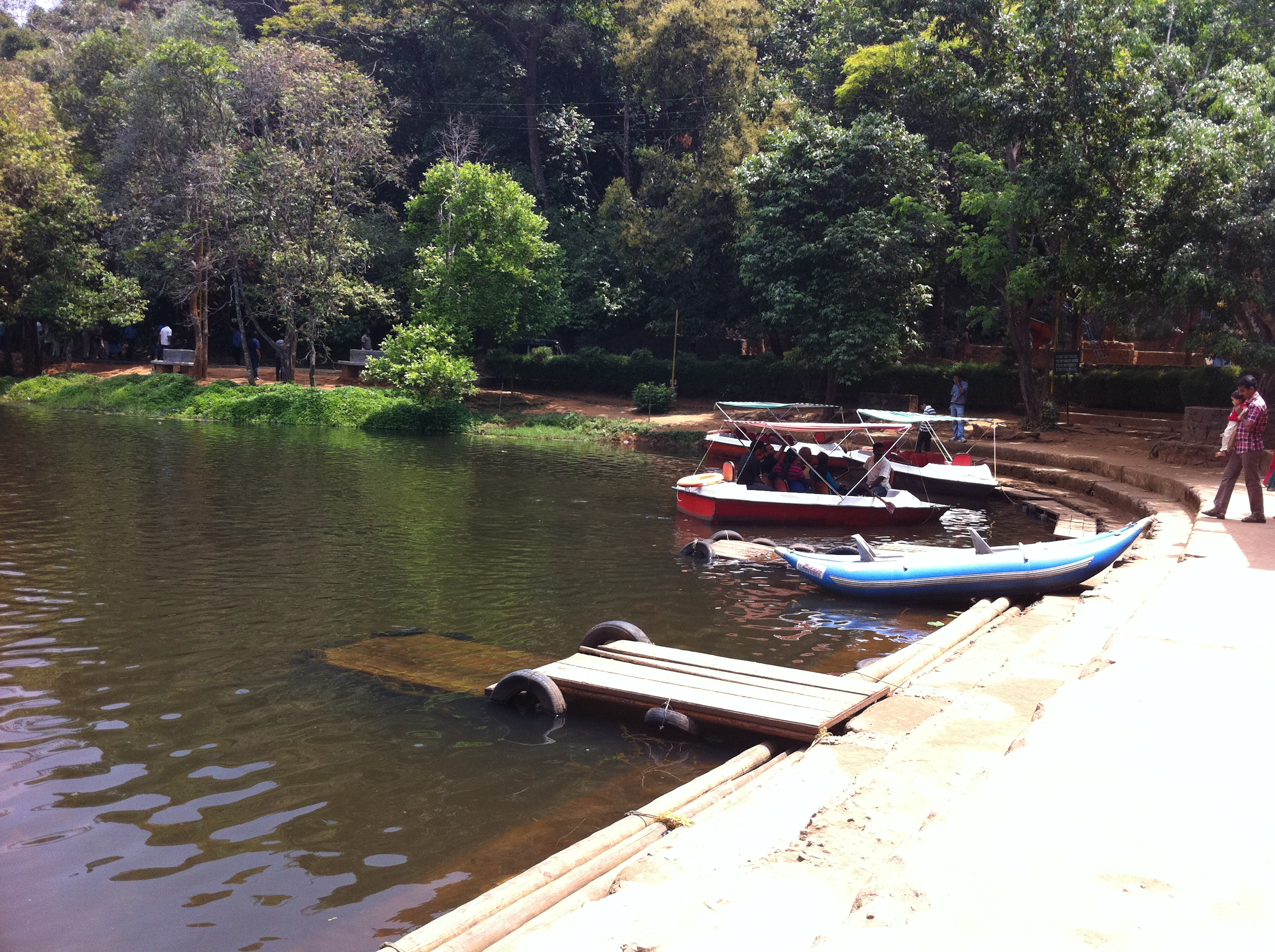
Boats on the lake

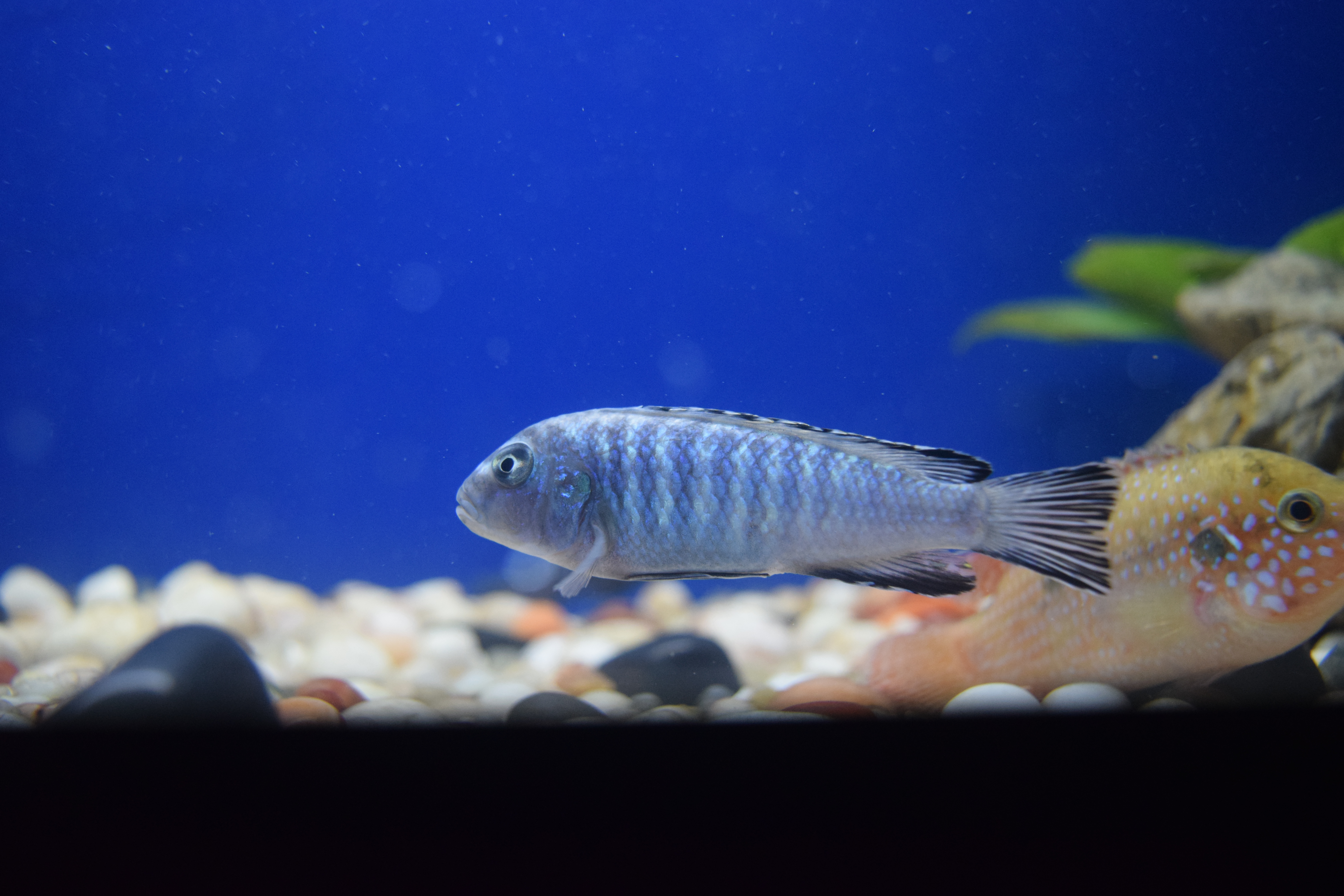
A view from lake aquarium

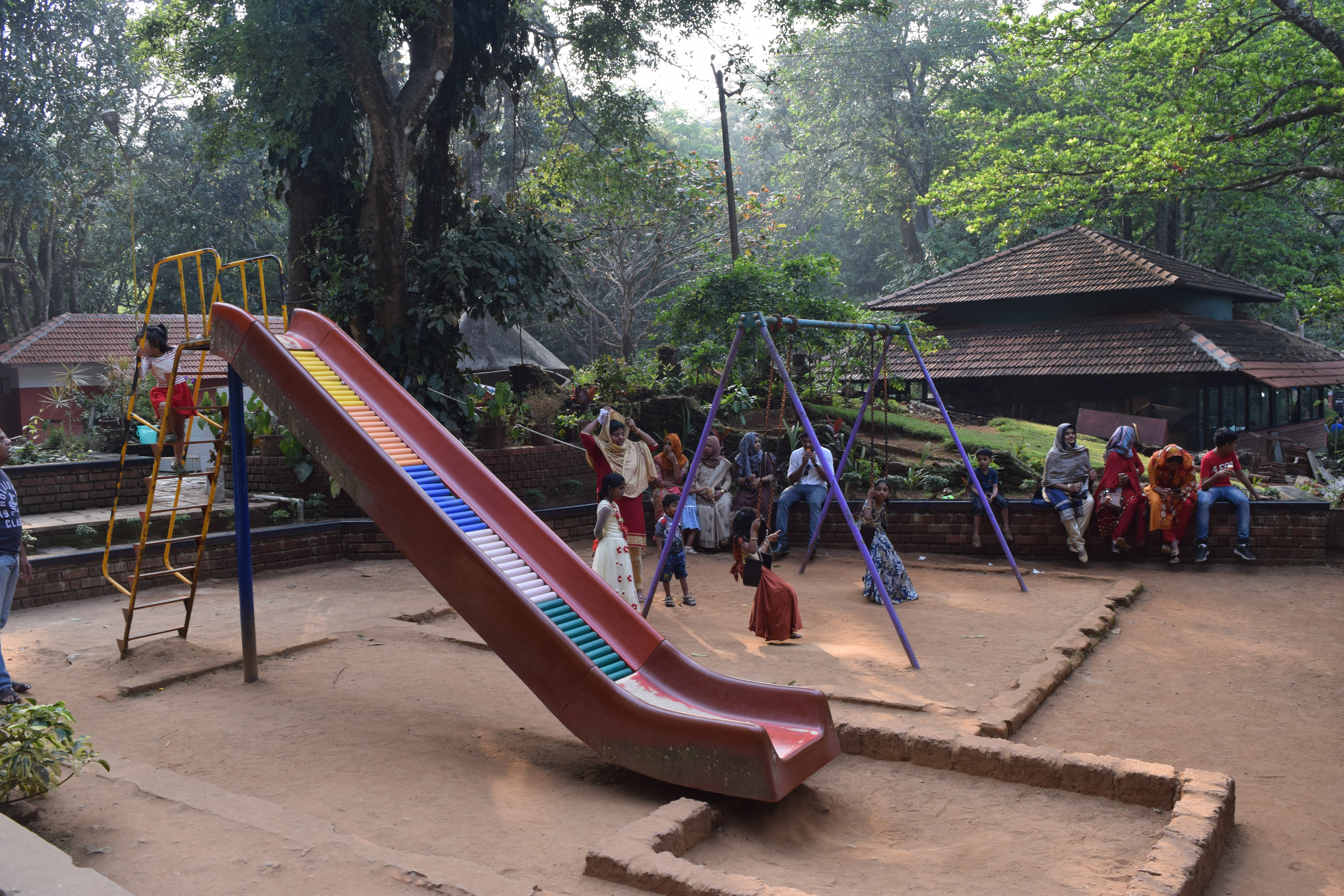
Children's park near Pookode Lake

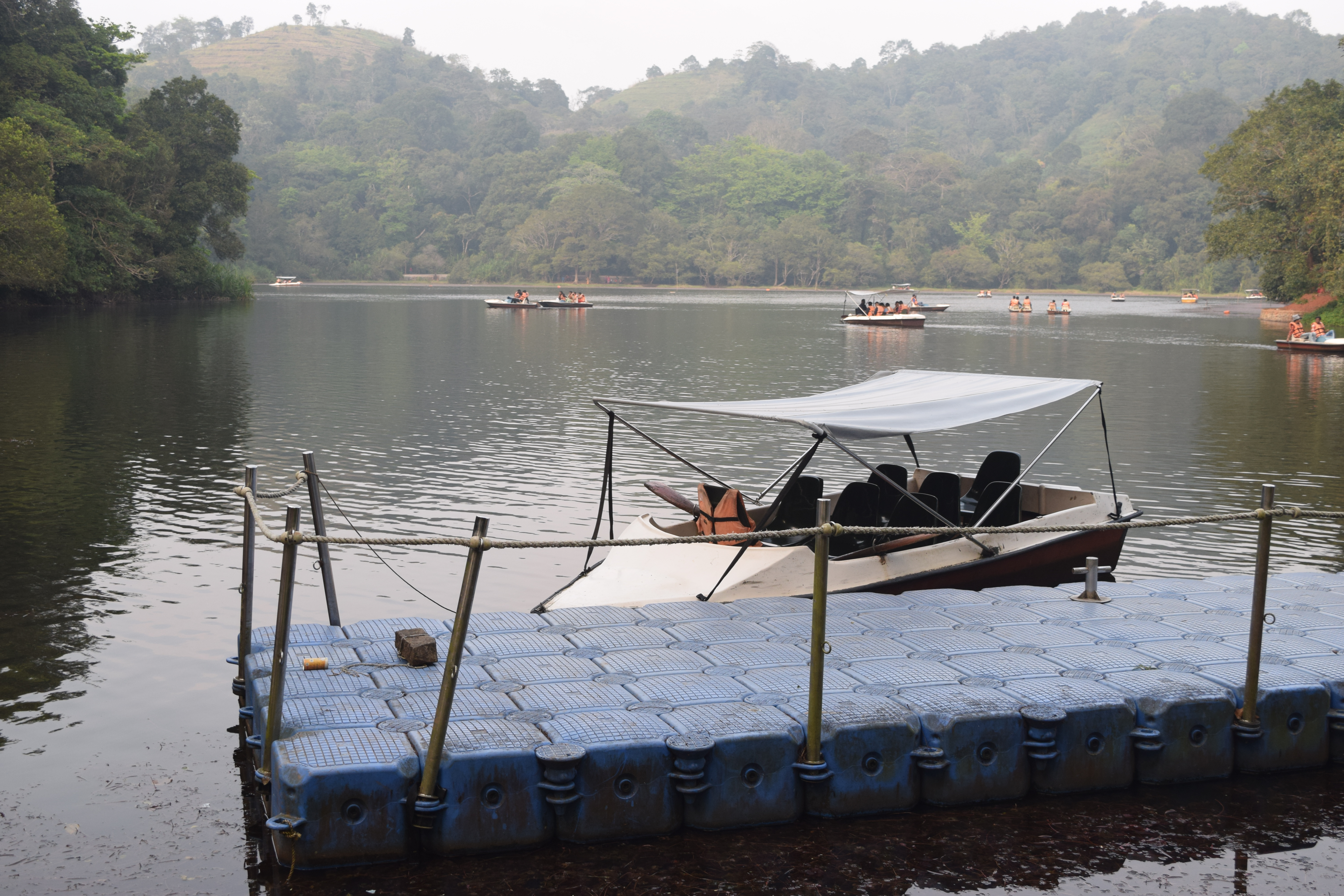
Pookode Lake boating

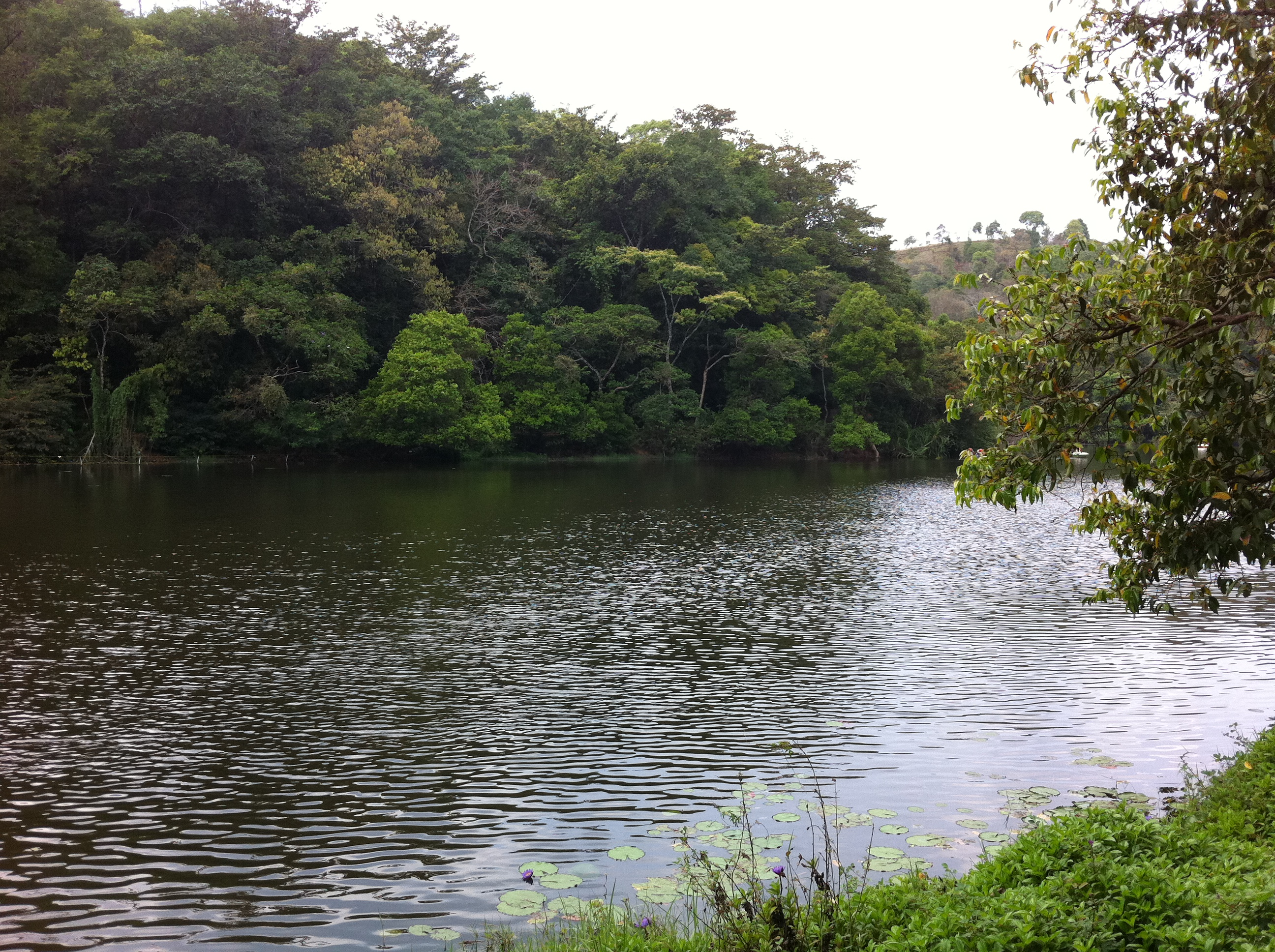
Lake view

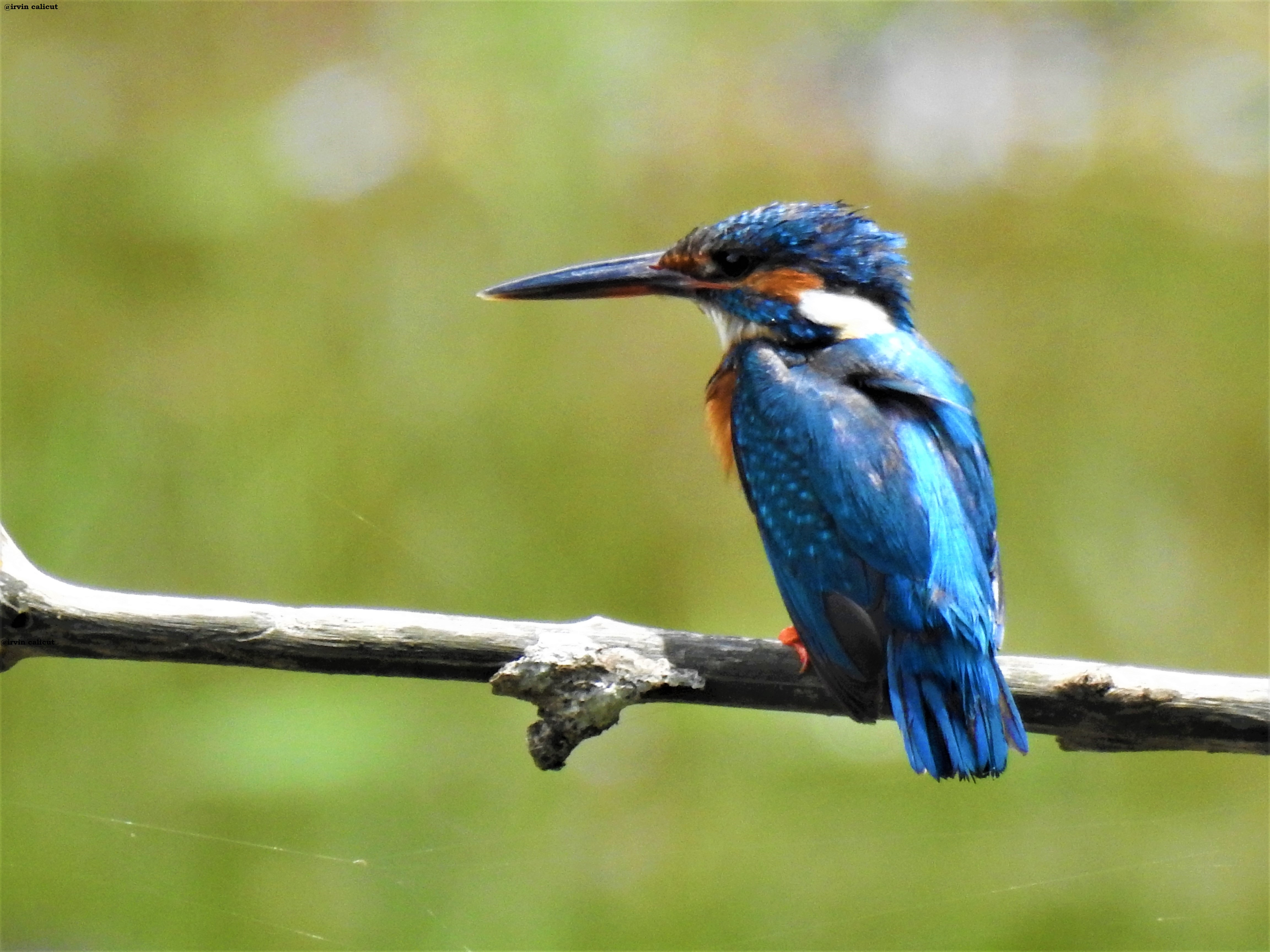
Kingfisher attraction

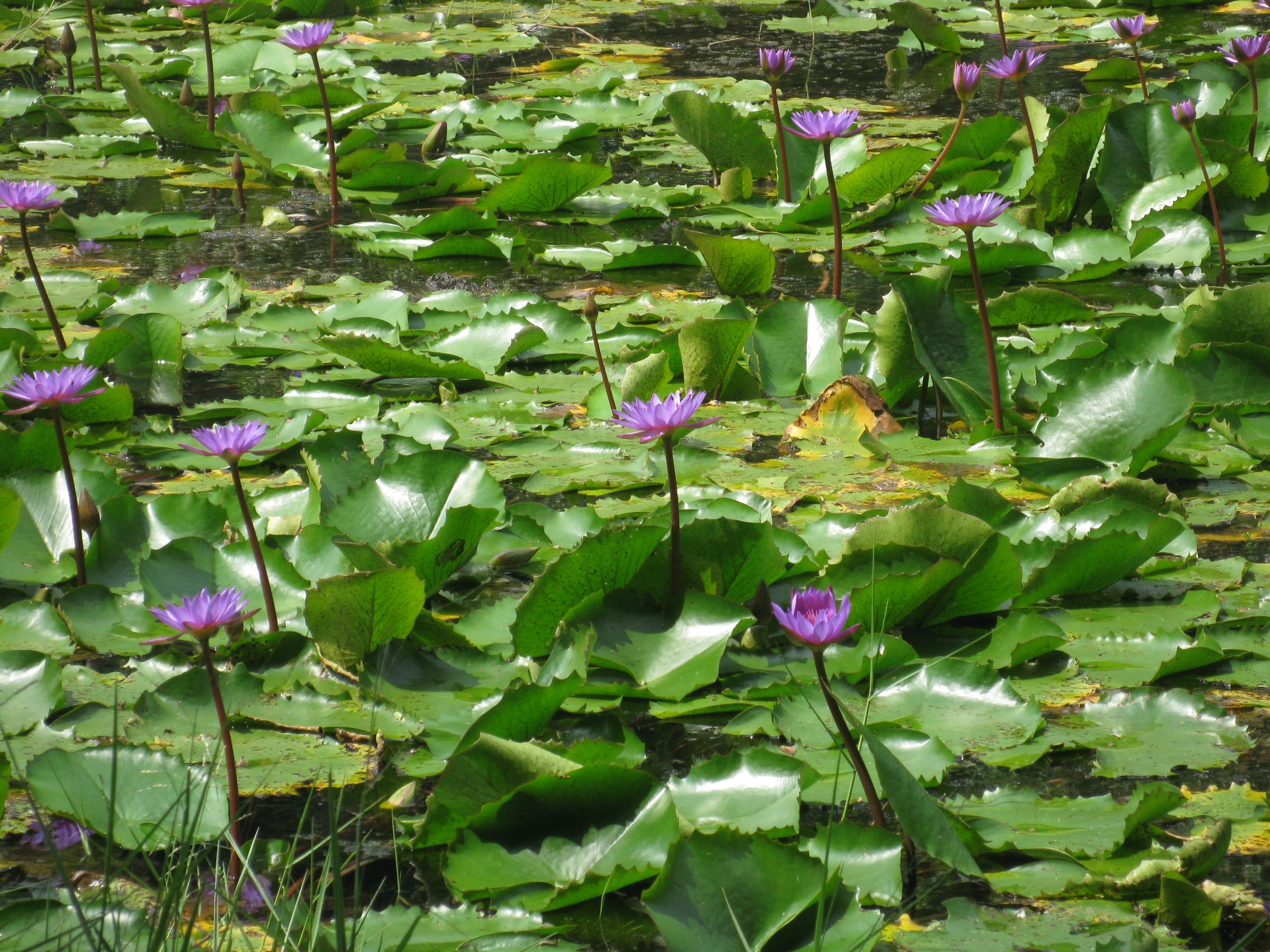
Water lilies at Pookode Lake

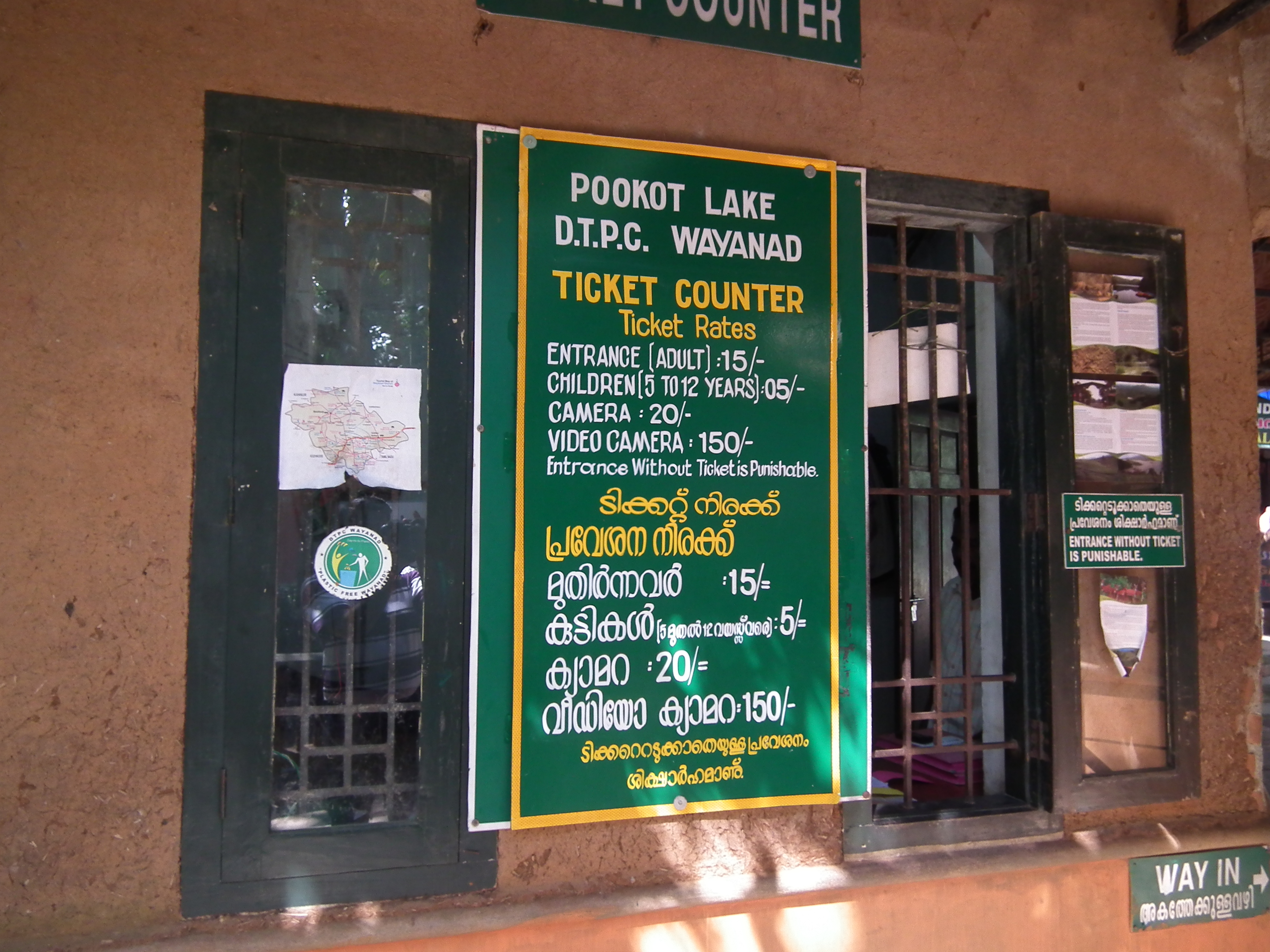
Ticket counter

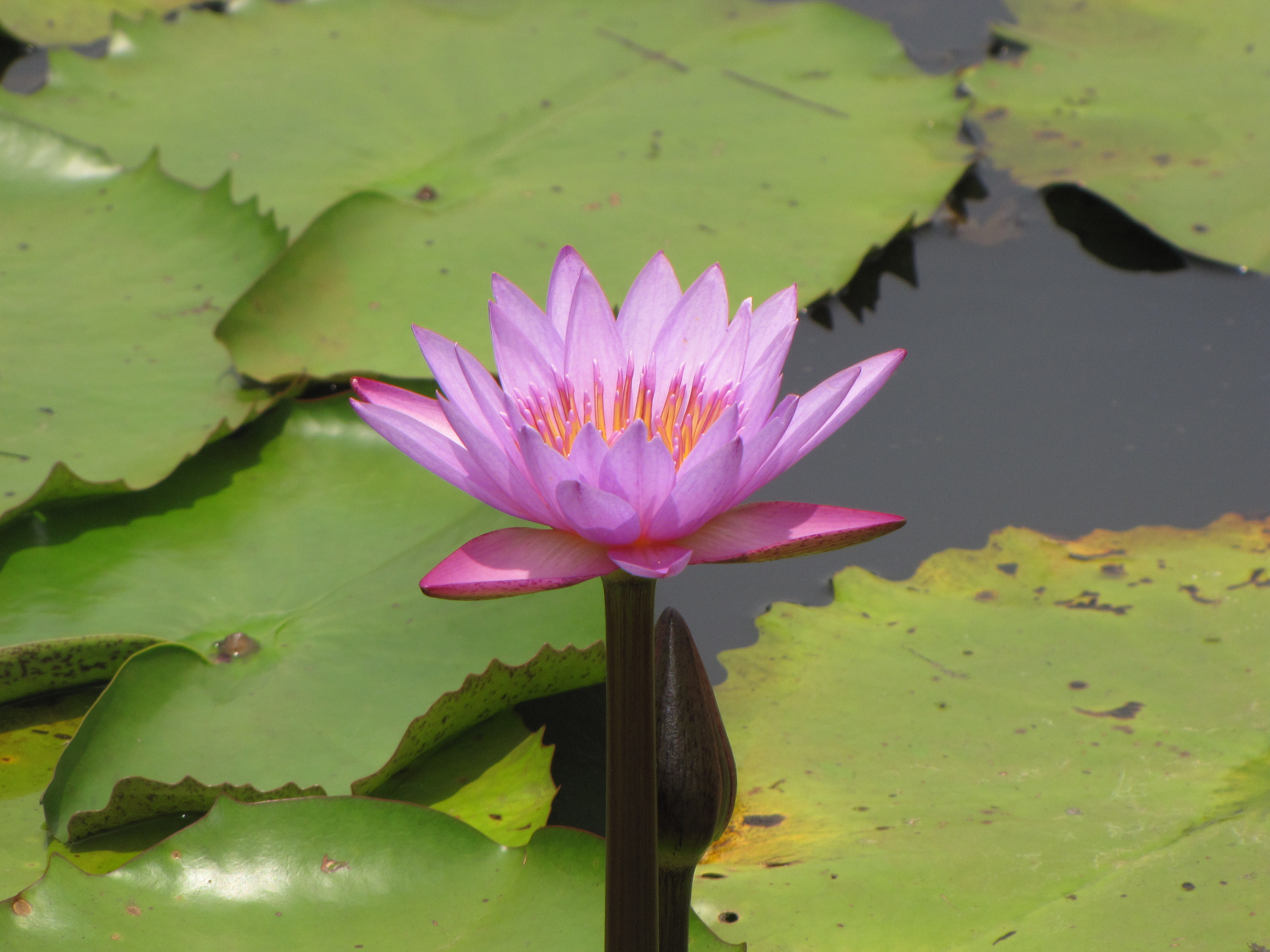
Water lilies at Pookode Lake

Video

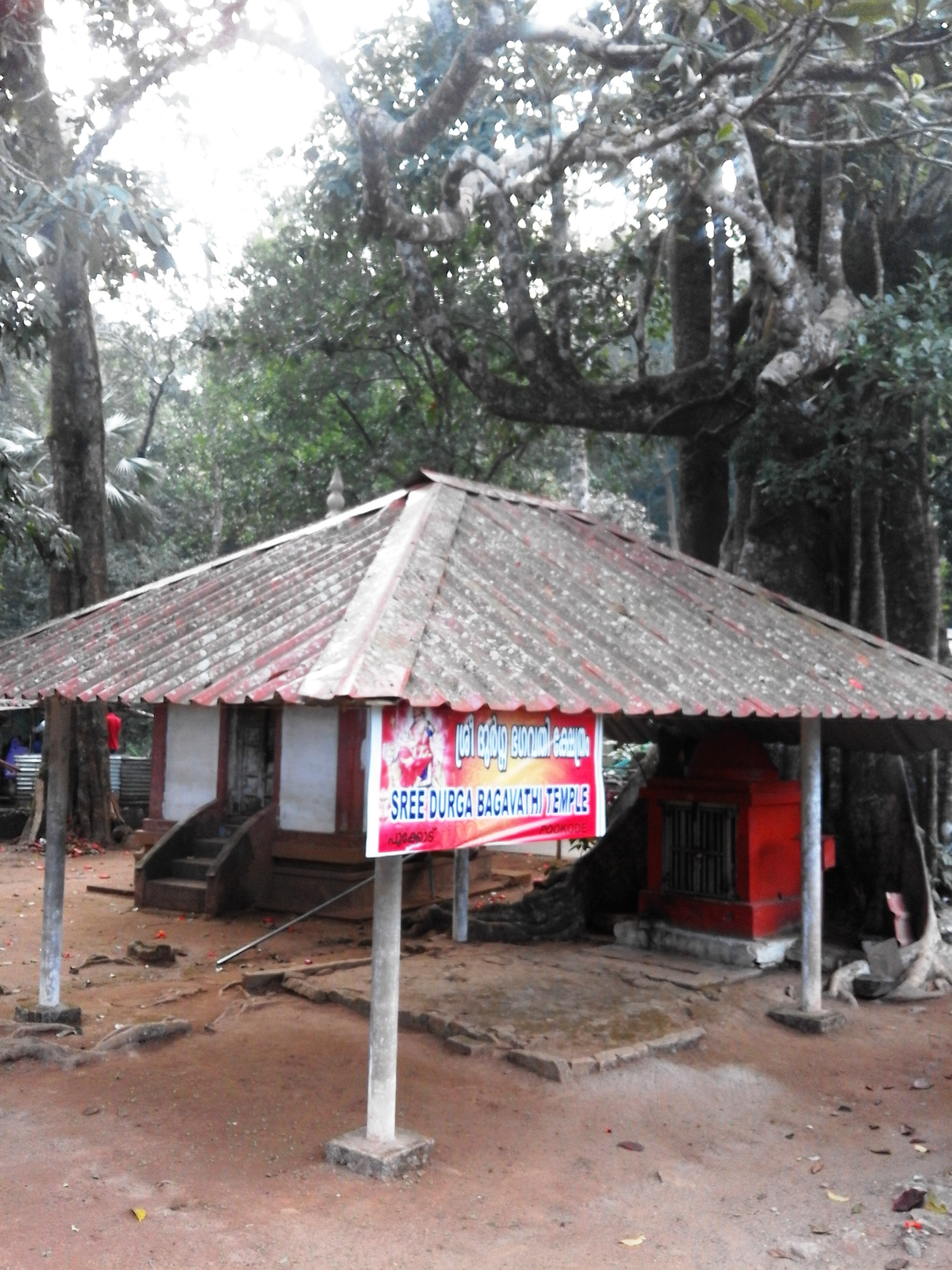
Temple on the lake

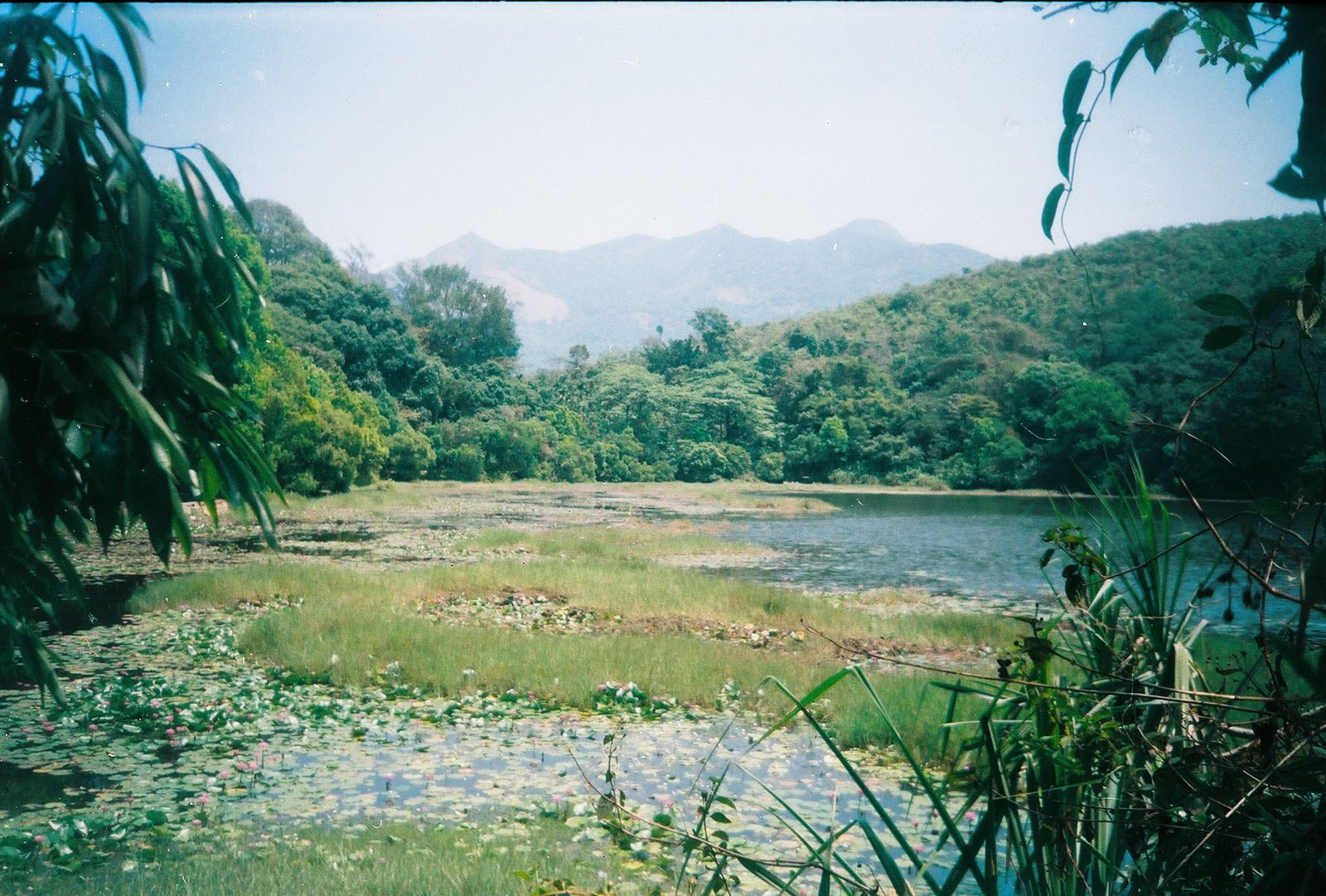
in the summer
