= Nenmeni =

- village
- Location in Kerala, India Nenmeni (India)
- Coordinates: 11°38′0″N 76°15′40″E
- Country: India
- State: Kerala
- District: Wayanad

Population (2011)
  - Total: 31,225

Languages
  - Official: Malayalam, Tamil, English
- Time zone: UTC+5:30 (IST)
- PIN: 6XXXXX
- ISO 3166 code: IN-KL
- Vehicle registration: KL-73

Nenmeni is a village near Bathery in Wayanad district in the state of Kerala, India.

== Demographics ==
As of 2011 India census, Nenmeni had a population of 31,225, with 15,262 males and 15,963 females.

== Gallery ==
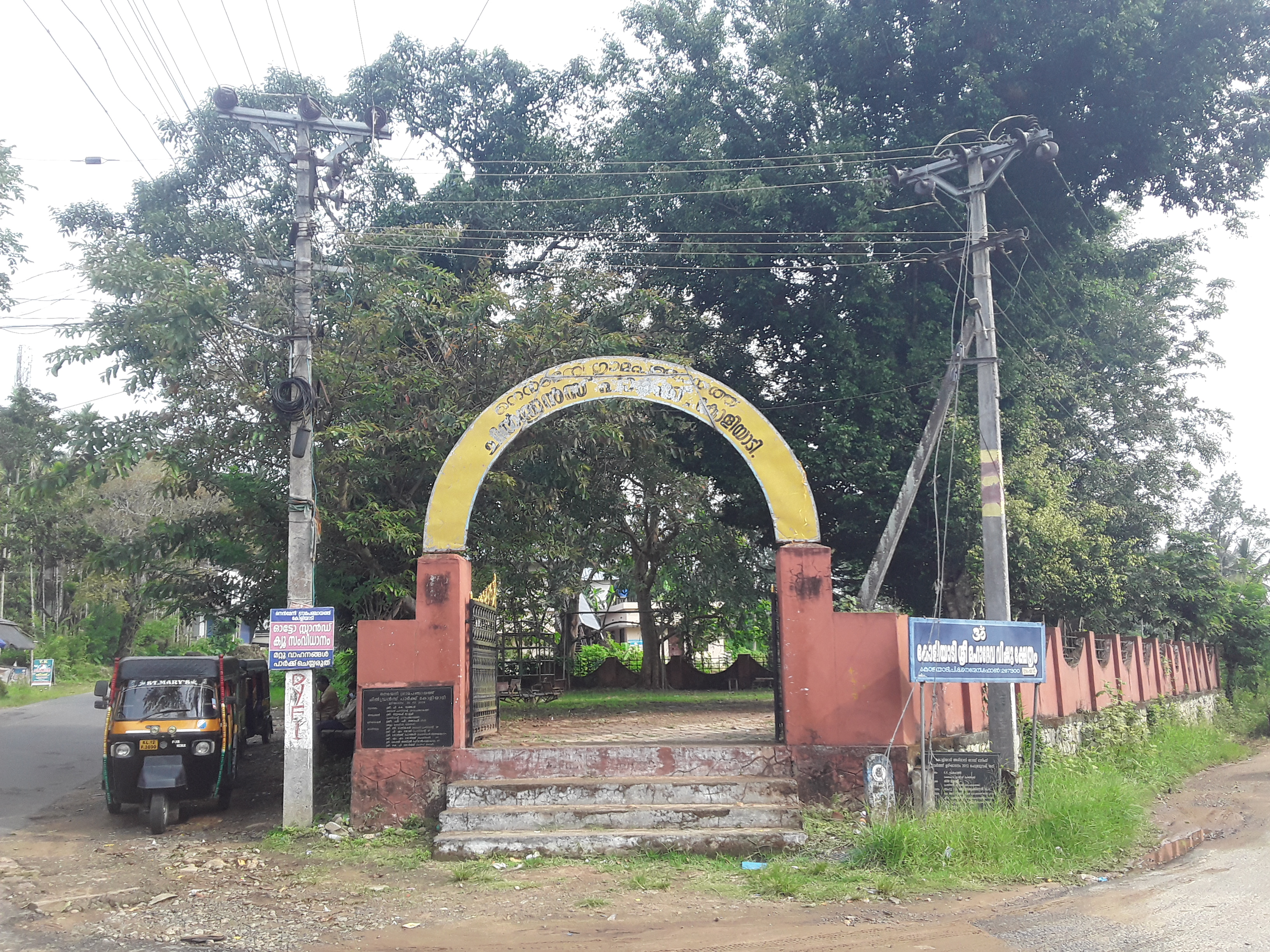
Koliyadi Park

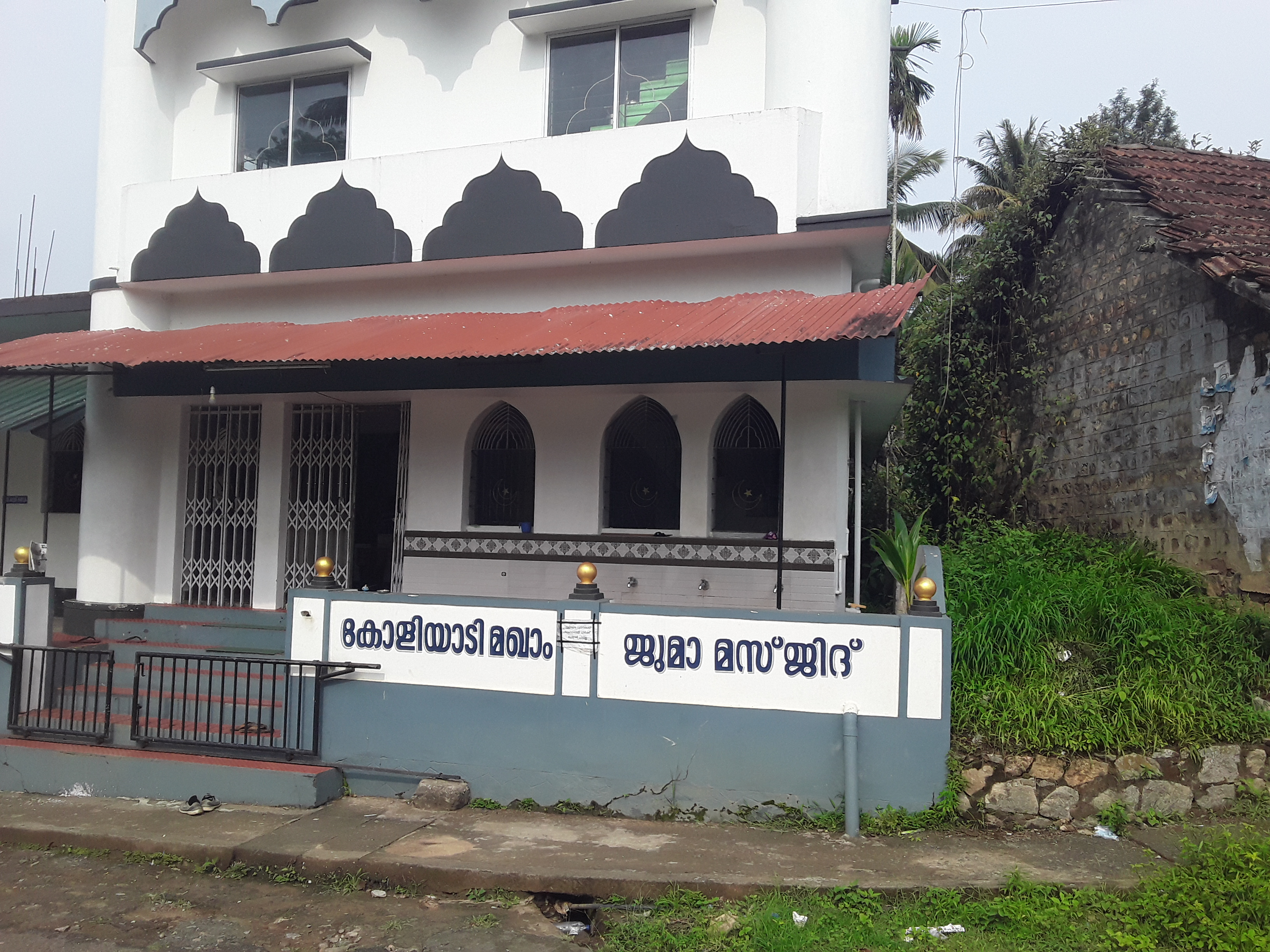
Koliyadi Dargah

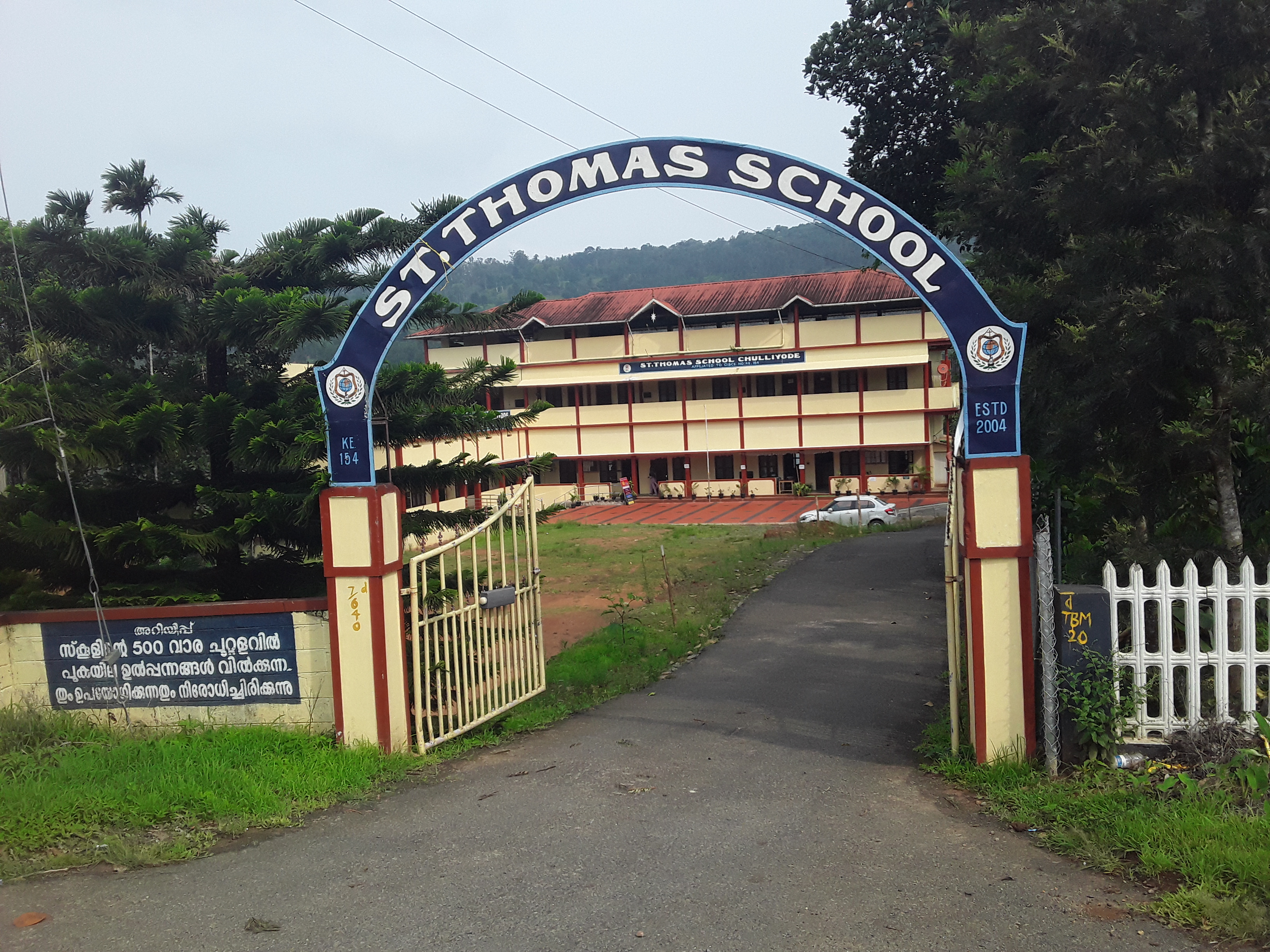
Chulliyode School
