= Kerala Veterinary and Animal Sciences University =

University in Kerala

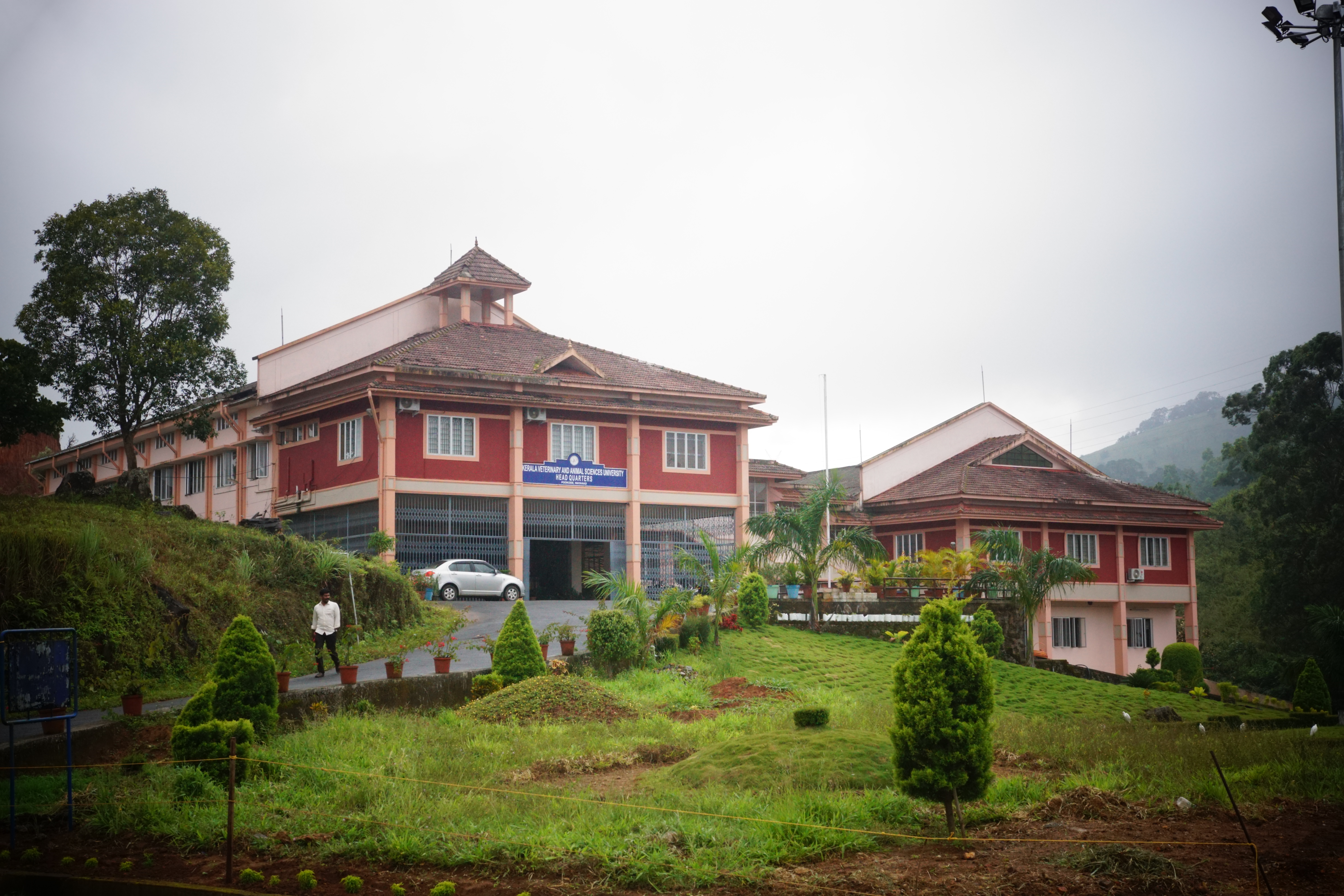
- Motto in English: Ideas in action
- Type: Public
- Established: 12 June 2010; 16 years ago
- Chancellor: Governor of Kerala
- Vice-Chancellor: Dr. Anil K. S.(in charge)
- Registrar: Dr. Sabin George (in charge)
- Location: Pookode, Wayanad, Kerala, India; 11.541753°N 76.020140°E
- Campus: Rural
- Website: kvasu.ac.in

Kerala Veterinary and Animal Sciences University (KVASU) is a university established by the Government of Kerala in December 2010 to further education, research and extension services in the field of Veterinary and Animal Sciences. The territorial jurisdiction of the university extends to the whole of the State of Kerala. Its headquarters is located at Pookode near Kalpetta in Wayanad District in Kerala State.

== Constituent colleges ==
There are eight constituent colleges of the university:

- College of Veterinary & Animal Sciences, Mannuthy, Thrissur (CVAS Mannuthy)
- College of Dairy Science & Technology, Kolahalamedu, Idukki (CDST Kolahalamedu)
- College of Dairy Science & Technology, Pookode, Wayanad (CDST Pookode)
- Dr. Verghese Kurien Institute of Dairy & Food Technology, Mannuthy, Thrissur (VKIDFT Mannuthy)
- College of Veterinary & Animal Sciences, Pookode, Wayanad (CVAS Pookode)
- College of Avian Sciences & Management, Thiruvazhamkunnu, Palakkad (CASM Thiruvazhamkunnu)
- College of Dairy Science & Technology, Kaimanam, Thiruvananthapuram (CDST Kaimanam)

Dr B Ashok, an alumnus of College of Veterinary and Animal Sciences at Mannuthy, is the first Vice-Chancellor of the university.

The foundation stone-laying ceremony of the administrative block of the university was held on 2 August 2010 by V.S. Achuthanandan, the then Chief Minister of Kerala.

== One-time grant of Rs.100 crore to KVASU ==
The newly formed Kerala Veterinary and Animal Sciences University has been allocated an amount of Rs. 100 crore in the Union Budget for 2011–12. This is a one-time grant for the development of the potential in veterinary and animal sciences research in the new university. The grant is to be used for developing eight research schools in the veterinary colleges at Mannuthy and Pookode and the dairy science college at Mannuthy: animal production biotechnology; bio-energy and farm waste management; zoonoses and public health; patho-biological sciences and ethno-pharmacology; new media and research; avian sciences; and instrumentation and engineering.

== Institutions under KVASU ==
1. College of Dairy Science and Technology, Kolahalamedu, Idukki
2. College of Dairy Science and Technology, Pookode, Wayanad
3. Verghese Kurien Institute of Dairy and Food Technology, Mannuthy.
4. College of Veterinary and Animal Sciences, Pookode, Wayanad.
5. College of Avian Sciences and Management, Thiruvazhamkunnu, Palakkad.
6. College of Dairy Science and Technology, BSNL RTTC, Kaimanam, Thiruvananthapuram.
7. College of Dairy Science & Technology, Kolahalamedu, Idukki.
8. College of Veterinary and Animal Sciences, Mannuthy, Thrissur.
9. Clinical Veterinary Complex, College of Veterinary and Animal Sciences, Pookode.
10. Instructional farms attached to College of Veterinary and Animal Sciences, Pookode.
11. Livestock Research Station, Thiruvazhamkunnu, Palakkad.
12. Avian Research Station, Thiruvazhamkunnu, Palakkad
13. Base Farm, Kolahalamedu, Idukki.
14. University Poultry and Duck Farm, Mannuthy.
15. Pig Breeding Farm, Mannuthy.
16. Goat and Sheep Farm, Mannuthy.
17. Regional Cattle Infertility Research Centre, Kozhikode.
18. University Livestock Farm and Fodder Research and Development Scheme, Mannuthy.
19. All India Co-ordinated Research Project on Poultry, Mannuthy.
20. Centre for Advanced Studies in Poultry Science, Mannuthy.
21. Centre for Advanced Studies in Animal Breeding and Genetics, Mannuthy.
22. Centre for Wildlife Studies, Pookode.
23. Meat Plant, Mannuthy.
24. Dairy Plant, Mannuthy.
25. Veterinary Hospital, Kokkalai, Thrissur.
26. Veterinary Hospital, Mannuthy.
27. Cattle Breeding Farm, Thumburmuzhy.
