= Vythiri =

- Town
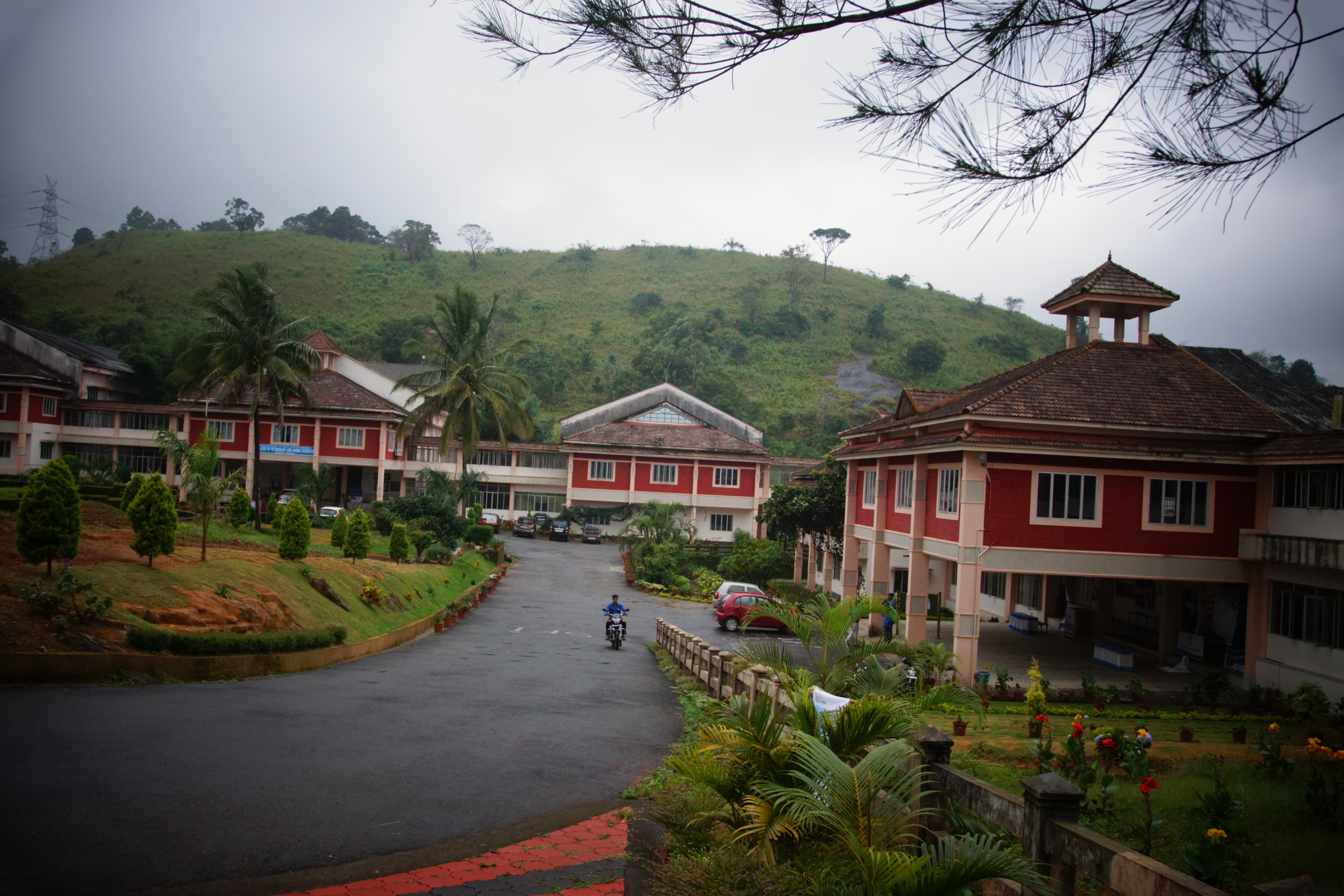
- Veterinary University

- Location in Kerala, India Vythiri (India)
- Coordinates: 11.54966°N 76.03638°E
- Country: India
- State: Kerala
- District: Wayanad

Languages
  - Official: Malayalam, English
- Time zone: UTC+5:30 (IST)

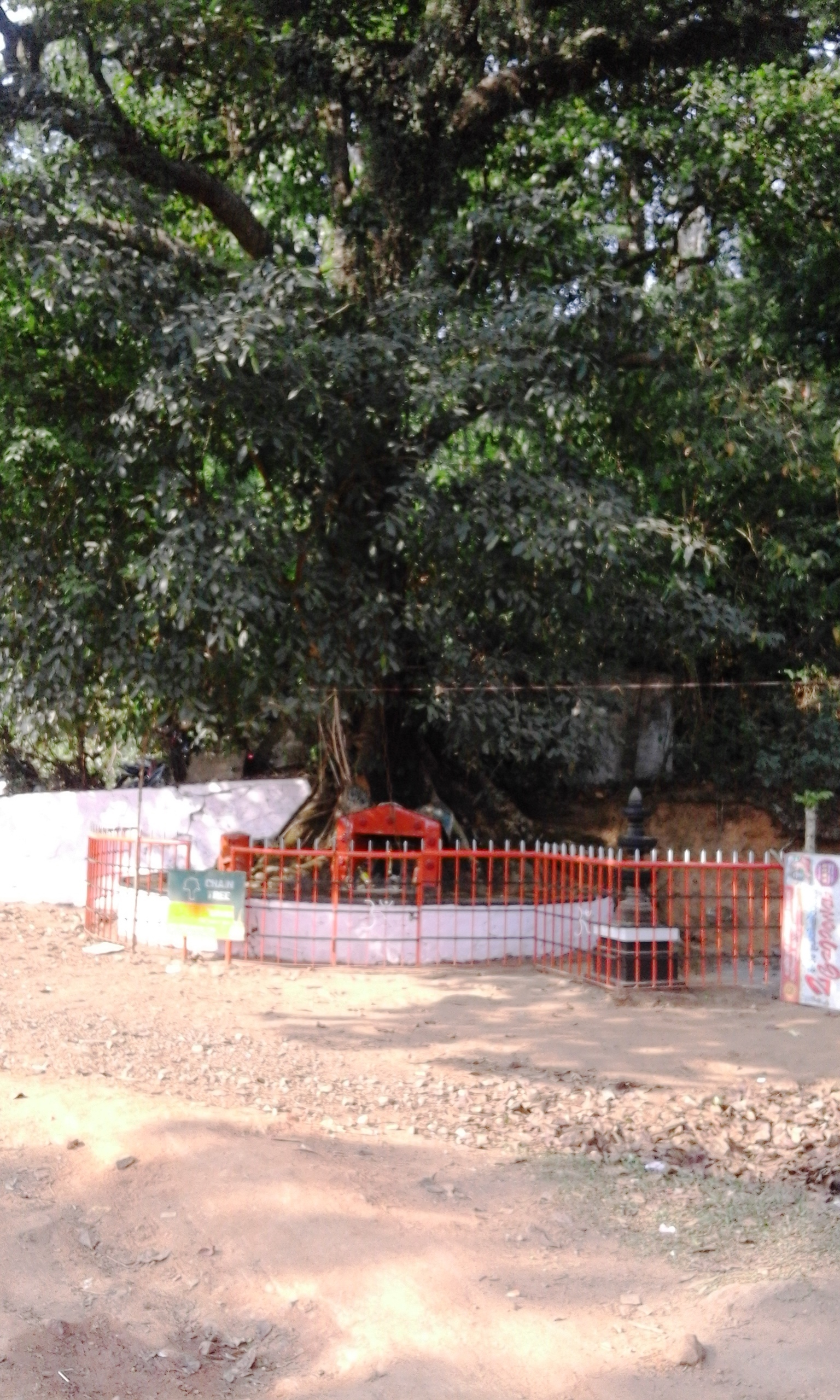
The legendary Chain Tree

Vythiri is a town and a taluk located in Wayanad district in the Indian state of Kerala. Along with Mananthavady and Sulthan Bathery, it is one of the three taluks in the district. Vythiri spans a total area of 2.084 sq. km. and is a tourist destination.

== Climate ==
Climate data for Vythiri, Kerala
Month	Jan	Feb	Mar	Apr	May	Jun	Jul	Aug	Sep	Oct	Nov	Dec	Year
Mean daily maximum °C (°F)	27.2 (81.0)	28.8 (83.8)	30.3 (86.5)	30.1 (86.2)	29.3 (84.7)	25.8 (78.4)	24.4 (75.9)	25.0 (77.0)	26.0 (78.8)	26.6 (79.9)	26.6 (79.9)	26.7 (80.1)	27.2 (81.0)
Mean daily minimum °C (°F)	16.9 (62.4)	18.0 (64.4)	19.7 (67.5)	20.8 (69.4)	20.9 (69.6)	19.8 (67.6)	19.4 (66.9)	19.5 (67.1)	19.3 (66.7)	19.5 (67.1)	18.7 (65.7)	17.3 (63.1)	19.2 (66.5)
Average precipitation mm (inches)	4 (0.2)	10 (0.4)	20 (0.8)	101 (4.0)	226 (8.9)	764 (30.1)	1,348 (53.1)	689 (27.1)	301 (11.9)	251 (9.9)	100 (3.9)	26 (1.0)	3,840 (151.3)
Source: Climate-Data.org

== Tourism ==
The all season attractive weather, greenery and the terrain of this place make Vythiri a major tourist destination in Kerala.

Tourist sites in the area include Lakkidi View Point, at 700 meters above sea level, which overlooks the area's peaks, streams, and the canopy of tropical forests. Pookode Lake, a scenic freshwater lake in the Wayanad district, is also a tourist attraction.

According to the local legend, an English engineer built the Ghat road to Vythiri on the basis of the information given by a tribal youth. After getting the necessary guidance, the English people killed the tribal guide. The spirit of the tribal youth got angry and caused many accidents on the road. So a priest took the initiative to chain the spirit to a tree in Vythiri. This "Chain Tree" is seen even today at Lakkidi. Some of the passing motorists even pay homage to the tree for allowing a safe passage.

The Honey Museum Wayanad, located in the area, offers a "glimpse into the world of bees and honey production". The museum features a tasting area where guests can sample a variety of honeys from around the world.

== Administration ==
The Vythiri taluk consists of 18 villages, including Lakkidi, Vythiri, Chundale, Padinjarathara, Meppadi, Kalpetta, and Kaniyambetta. The village of Vythiri acts as the administrative centre of Vythiri Taluk.

== Religion and worship ==
St. Mary's Orthodox Church, part of the Sultan Bathery Diocese of the Malankara Orthodox Syrian Church, is located in Vythiri. Sree Mariyaman Temple, located in the centre of Vythiri Town Vythiri Jumma Masjid, located in the centre part of Vythiri Town, St Joseph Church Catholic Church, part of the Archdiocese of Calicut situated in the town, this church is considered as the first Catholic church in Wayanad District St Mary's Catholic Church part of the Eparchy of Mananthavady located in Vythiri

== Altitude ==
Vythiri is 700 meters above the sea level and the weather is notably cooler than other parts of Wayanad. There are many resorts in Wayanad due to the climate of the area.

== Education ==
There is a university here specializing in veterinary science and there is a special college for catering management. Oriental school of hotel management.

== Transportation ==
Vythiri is 66 km by road from Kozhikode railway station and this road includes nine hairpin bends. The nearest major airport is at Calicut. The road to the east connects to Mysore and Bangalore. Night journey is not allowed on this sector as it goes through Bandipur national forest.

== Landslides at Vythiri taluk in 2024 ==
Landslides occurred near the villages of Punjirimattom, Mundakkai, Chooralmala, and Vellarimala in July 2024 due to heavy rains that triggered the collapse of hillsides. The landslides marked one of the deadliest natural disasters in Kerala's history, with reports of at least 400 deaths.

== Gallery ==
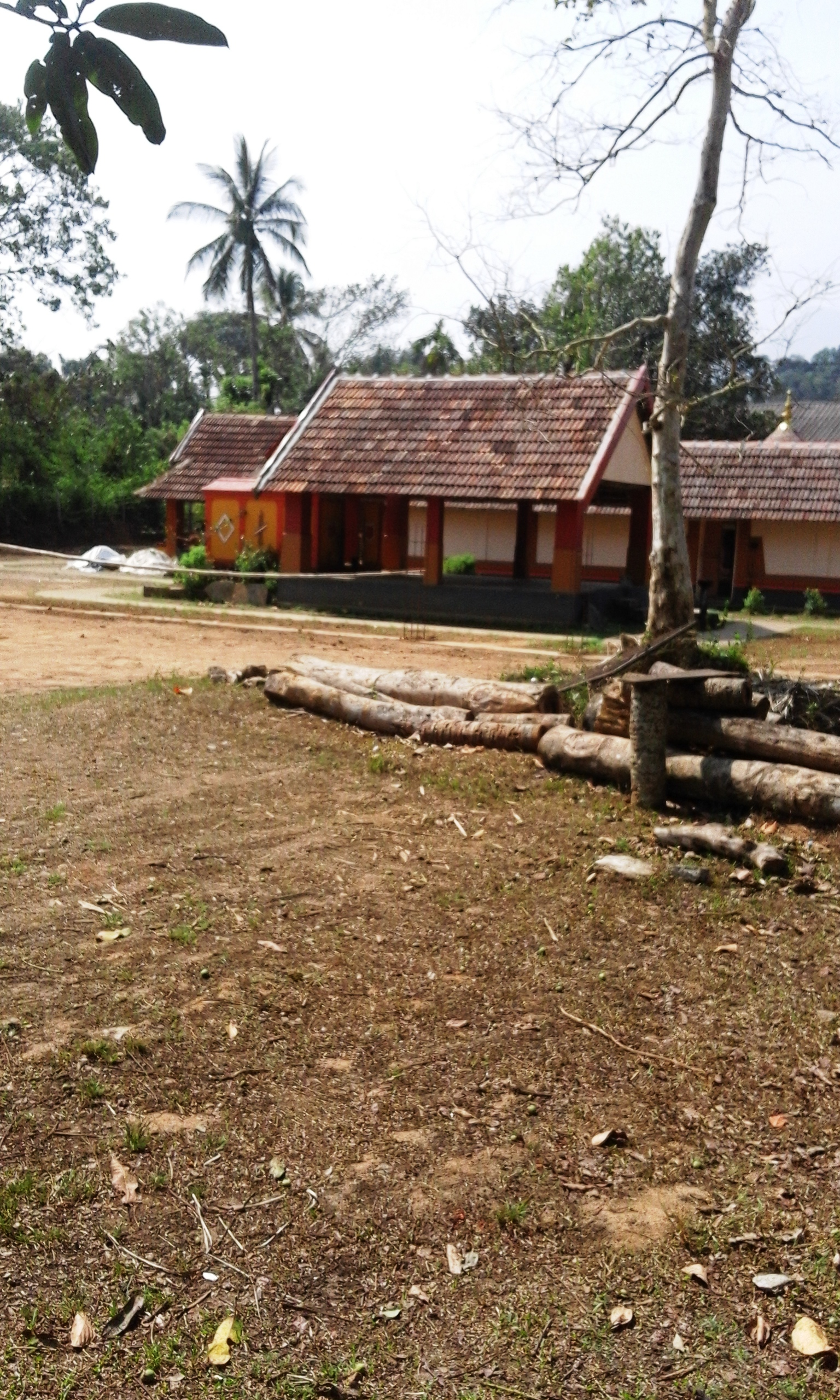
Madiyoor Mahavishnu Temple

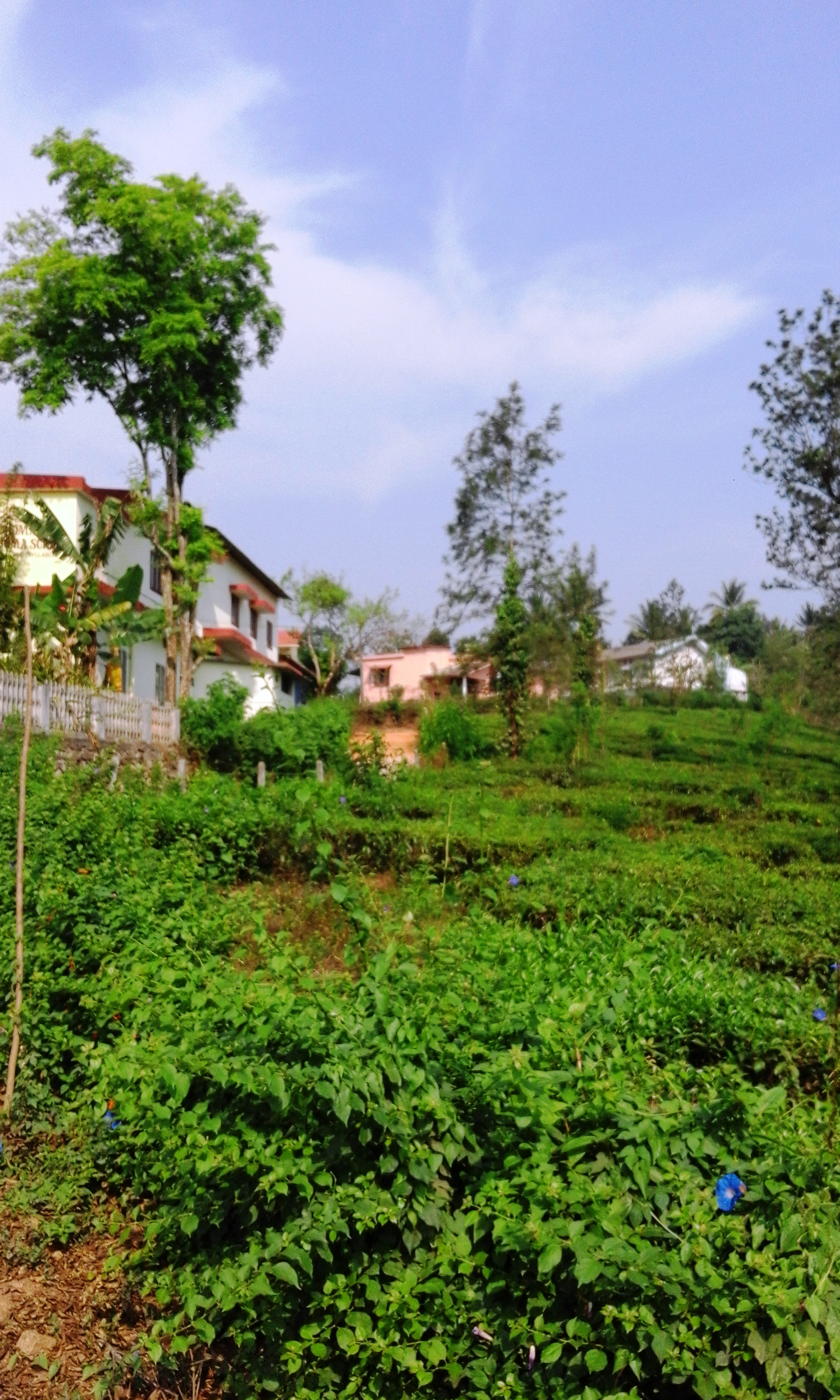
Marthomma School, Chundale

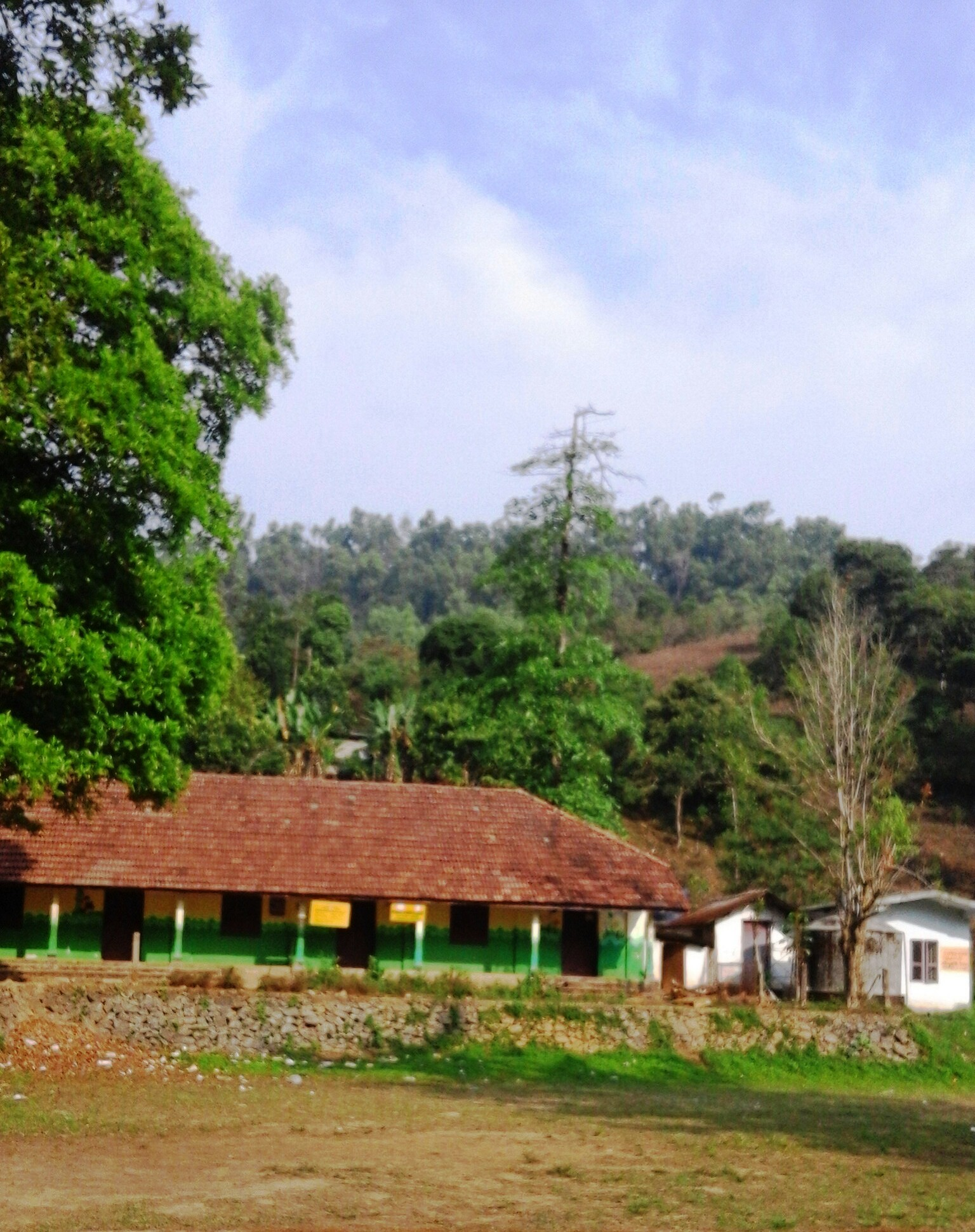
Lakkidi School

== See also ==
- Padinjarathara town
- Kalpetta town
