= Transportation in Wayanad =

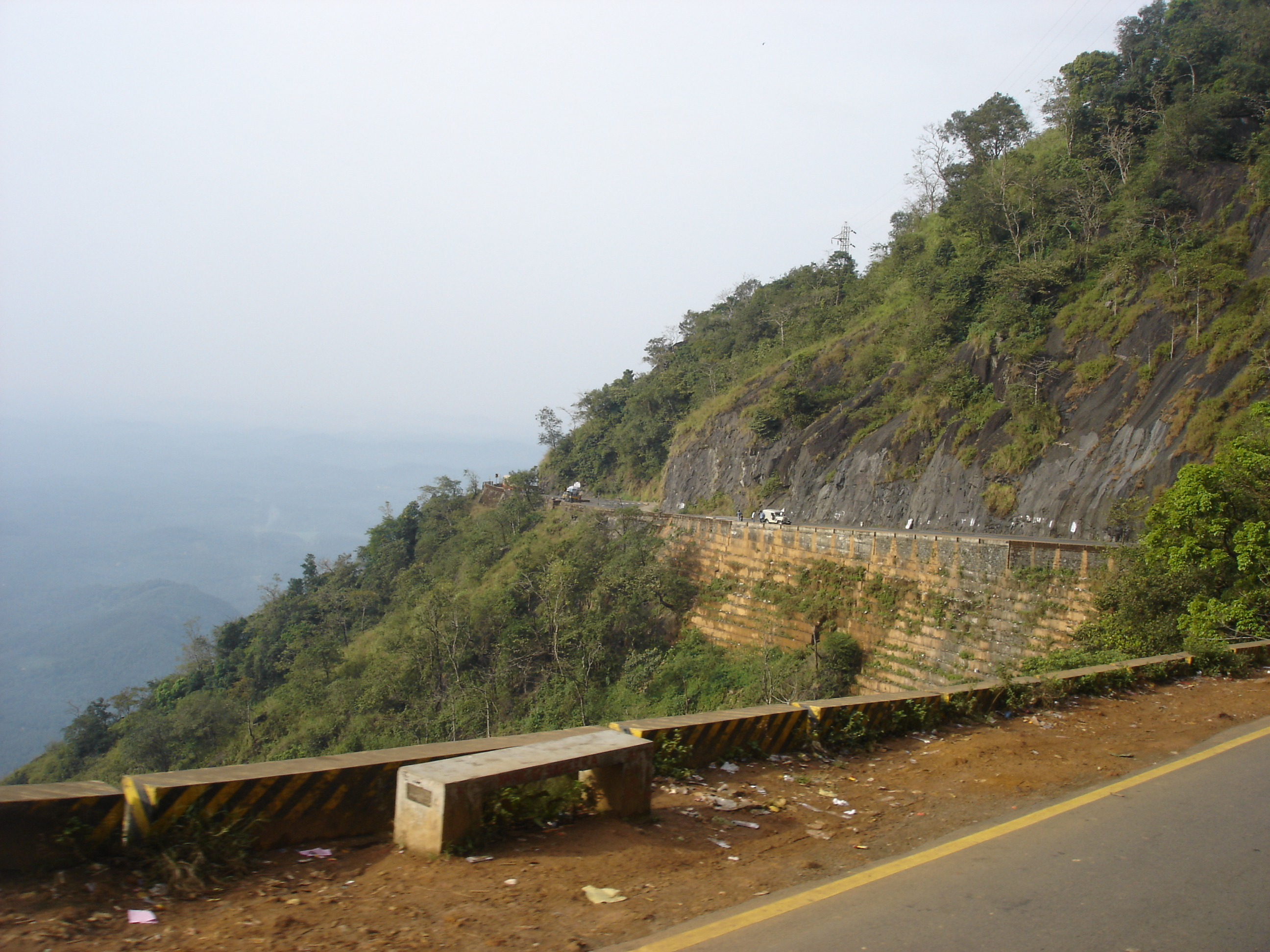
Wayanad Hill Road

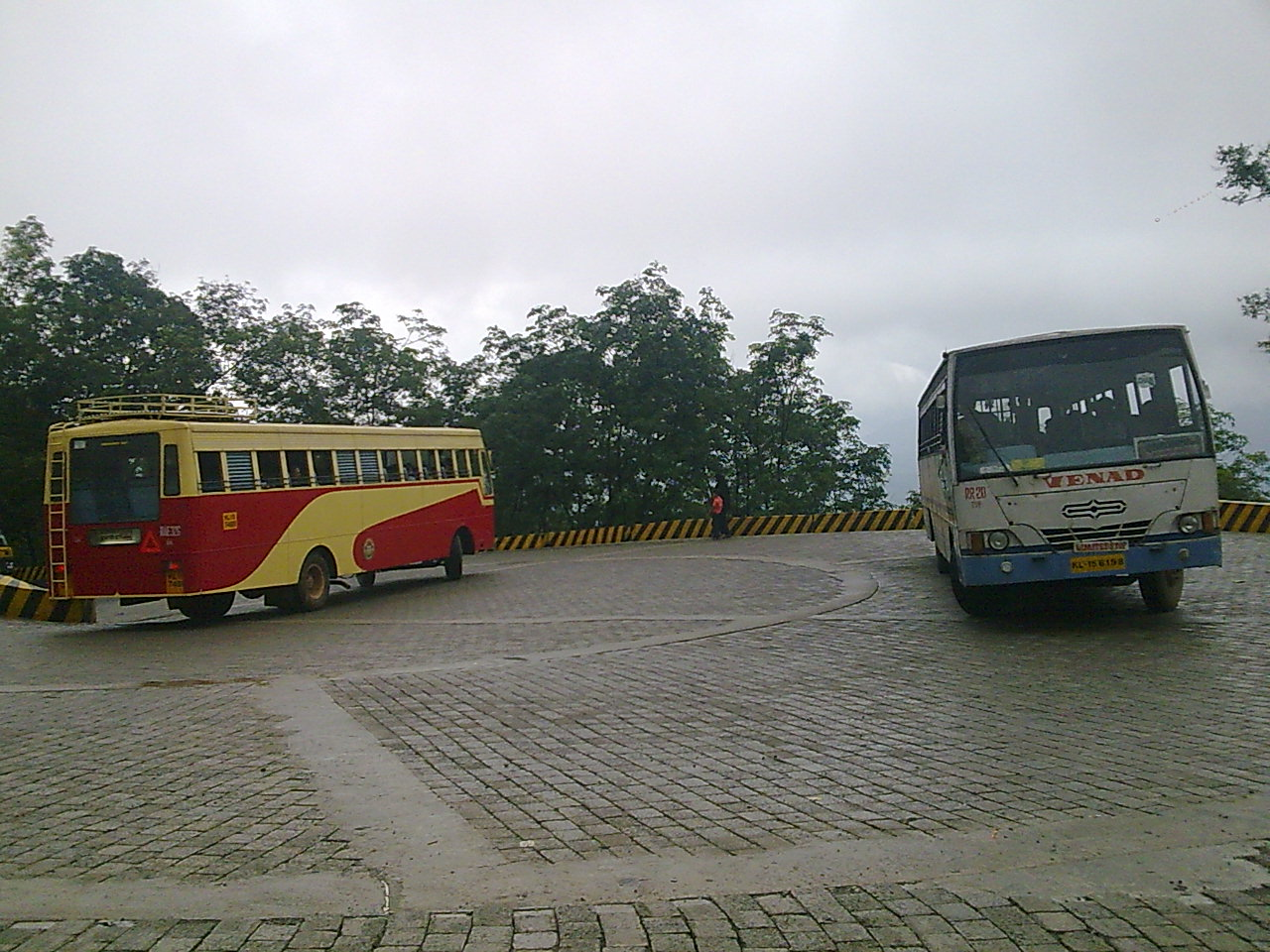
Hairpin Bend

The district capital of Wayanad is Kalpetta town. Kalpetta has very good road connectivity with the rest of Kerala and neighboring South Indian cities. National Highway 766 (India) NH766 connects Kalpetta with Kozhikode and Mysore. State Highways connect Kalpetta with Ooty in Tamil Nadu and Madikeri in Karnataka.

== Night Traffic Ban ==
En route to Mysore on NH 766, past Wayanad district boundary, which is also the Kerala state boundary, NH 766 passes through Bandipur National Park. There is a night traffic ban imposed on this stretch since 2009.

== Road routes ==
Kalpetta – Mysore (132 km): Sulthan Bathery – Gundlupet - Mysore(NH766)(Night travel not allowed)

Kalpetta – Mysore (115 km): Mananthavady – Bavali – Handpost (Heggadadevana kote) - Mysore(SH33) (Night travel not allowed) Bavali forest checkpost will be open only up to 6 PM.

Kalpetta – Mysore (159 km): Mananthavady - Kutta- Mysore (Night travel allowed) Road is bumpy.

Kalpetta - Kozhikode (99 km): Padinjarathara - Perambra

Kalpetta – Ooty (127 km) : Meppadi – Gudalur

Kalpetta – Madikeri (135 km): Mananthavady - Kutta

Kalpetta - Kannur (123 km) : Mananthavady - Koothuparamba

Kalpetta - Malappuram (99 km) : Thamarassery - Areekkode - Manjeri

Kalpetta - Kozhikode (72 km) : Vythiri - Thamarassery

The authorities has announced new National Highway connecting Mysore with Malappuram via Gonikoppa, Kutta, Mananthavadi & Kalpetta.

== Kalpetta ==
Kalpetta has very good road connectivity with the rest of Kerala and neighboring South Indian cities. NH 766 connects Kalpetta with Kozhikode and Mysore. State Highways connect Kalpetta with Ooty in Tamil Nadu and Madikeri in Karnataka.

=== Highways ===
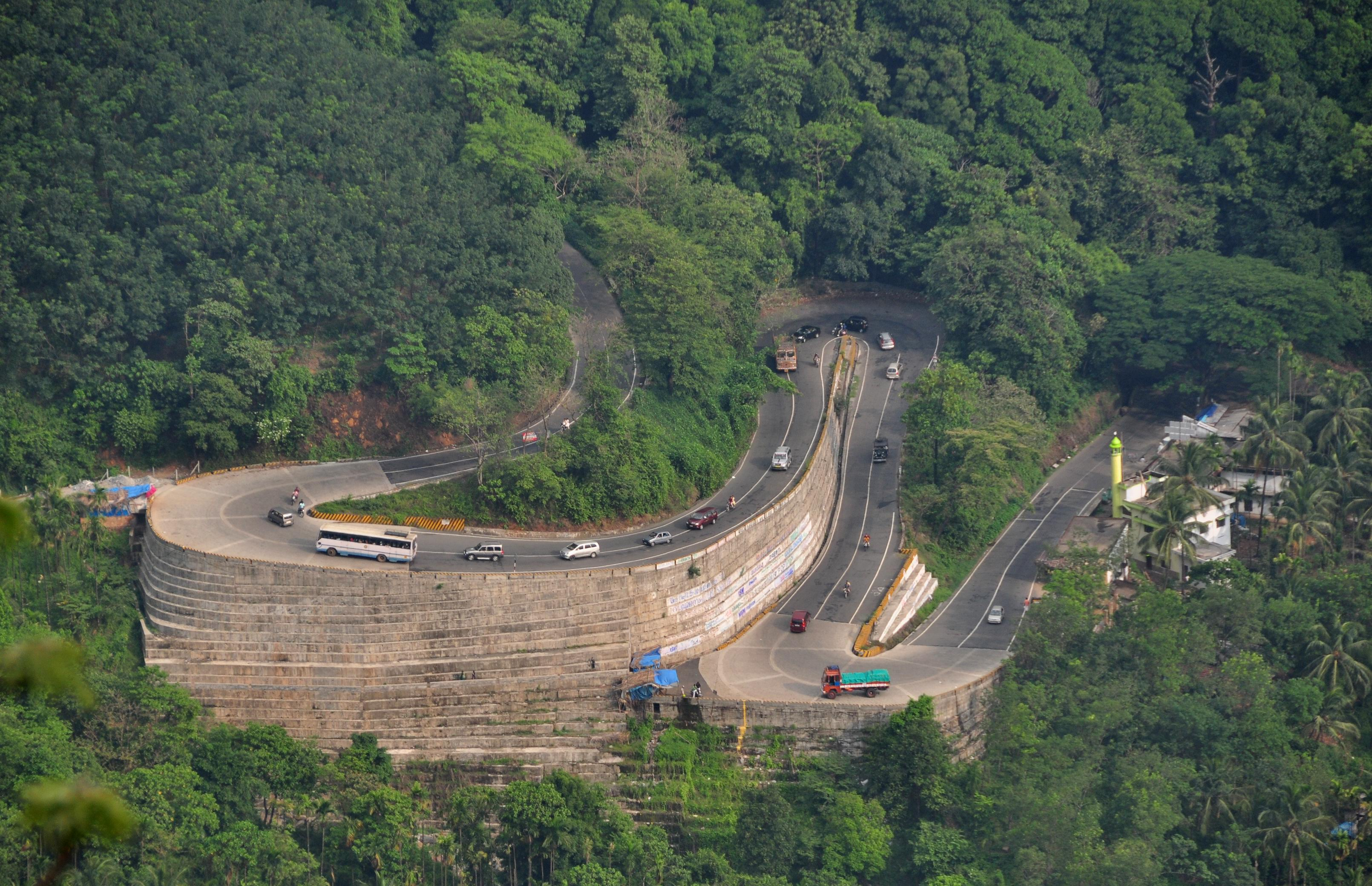
Wayanad Ghat Road (Mountain Pass) on NH 766

All national and state highways passing through Wayanad District intersect at Kalpetta, making it a strategic location and the "Gateway of Wayanad":

- National Highway NH 766 connects Kalpetta with Kozhikode in Kerala and Mysore in Karnataka. This highway is the primary access to Wayanad from the major cities of Kerala (Kozhikode, Kochi and Thiruvananthapuram) as well as Karnataka (Bangalore and Mysore).
- State Highway SH 29 connects to the road to Gudalur and Ooty at the "Kerala - Tamil Nadu state border". This highway was originally Kozhikode - Vythiri - Kerala State border however the section Kozhikode - Chundale is now part of NH766. This highway now starts at Chundale, 6 km away from Kalpetta town-center.
- State Highway SH 54 is an alternate road connecting Kalpetta with Kozhikode. This highway starts at Kalpetta and proceeds to Kozhikode through Padinjarathara, Poozhithode, Peruvannamuzhi, Perambra and Pavangad, Kozhikode. Note that the section Padinjarethara to Poozhithode is not yet laid as the environmental clearance to build the road through the forest is pending. This road is known as "Padinjarathara Road" at Kalpetta.
- State Highway SH 59 Hill Highway (Kerala) - This proposed highway connects both ends of Kerala state, passing through entire hilly regions of the state. This highway will pass through Kalpetta, connecting Mananthavady to the North and Meppadi and Nilambur to the South. (The section Meppadi to Nilambur is to be built).

=== Night Traffic Ban on NH 766 at Bandipur National Park ===
En route to Mysore on NH 766, past Wayanad district boundary, which is also the Kerala state boundary, NH 766 passes through Bandipur National Park. There is a night traffic ban imposed on this stretch since 2009.

== Mananthavady ==
Mainly five Ghat roads are used for reaching Mananthavady from coastal towns and lower hilly towns of Kerala:

1. From Thalassery: Nedumpoil-Periya Ghat road, which connects Kasargod, Kannur, Thalassery and Kuthuparamba with Wayanad
2. From Kozhikode: Thamarassery-Lakkidi Ghat road, part of NH 766, which connects Kozhikode and the rest of Kerala, south of Kozhikode with Wayanad
3. From Vatakara: Kuttiady-Pakramthalam Ghat road, which connects Thalassery, Vatakara, Nadapuram, Kuttiady and Thottilpalam with Wayanad
4. From Iritty: Kottiyoor-Ambayathode-Palchuram-Boys Town Ghat road, which connects lower hilly towns and villages of Kannur and Kasargod districts with Wayanad. The towns are Panathur, Vellarikundu, Chittarikkal, Udayagiri, Cherupuzha, Alakode, Sreekandapuram, Payyavoor, Iritty, Peravoor, Kelakam, Kottiyoor, etc.
5. From Nilambur: Vazhikkadavu-Nadukani Ghat road, which connects Nilambur, Palakkad, Thrissur and Malappuram, with Wayanad.

== See also ==
- Kozhikode–Wayanad Tunnel Road
