= Tourist attractions in Kalpetta =

== Mahatma Gandhi Museum ==
The Gandhi Memorial Museum and Library in Kalpetta is a boarding house near the Jain Temple where Gandhiji took rest during his visit. The museum is located at Puliyarmala, about 4 km from Kalpetta town-center.

== Puliyarmala Jain Temple ==
Anantnath Swami Temple at Puliyarmala is one of the very few present-day Jain temples in Kerala.

== M S Swaminathan Research Foundation ==
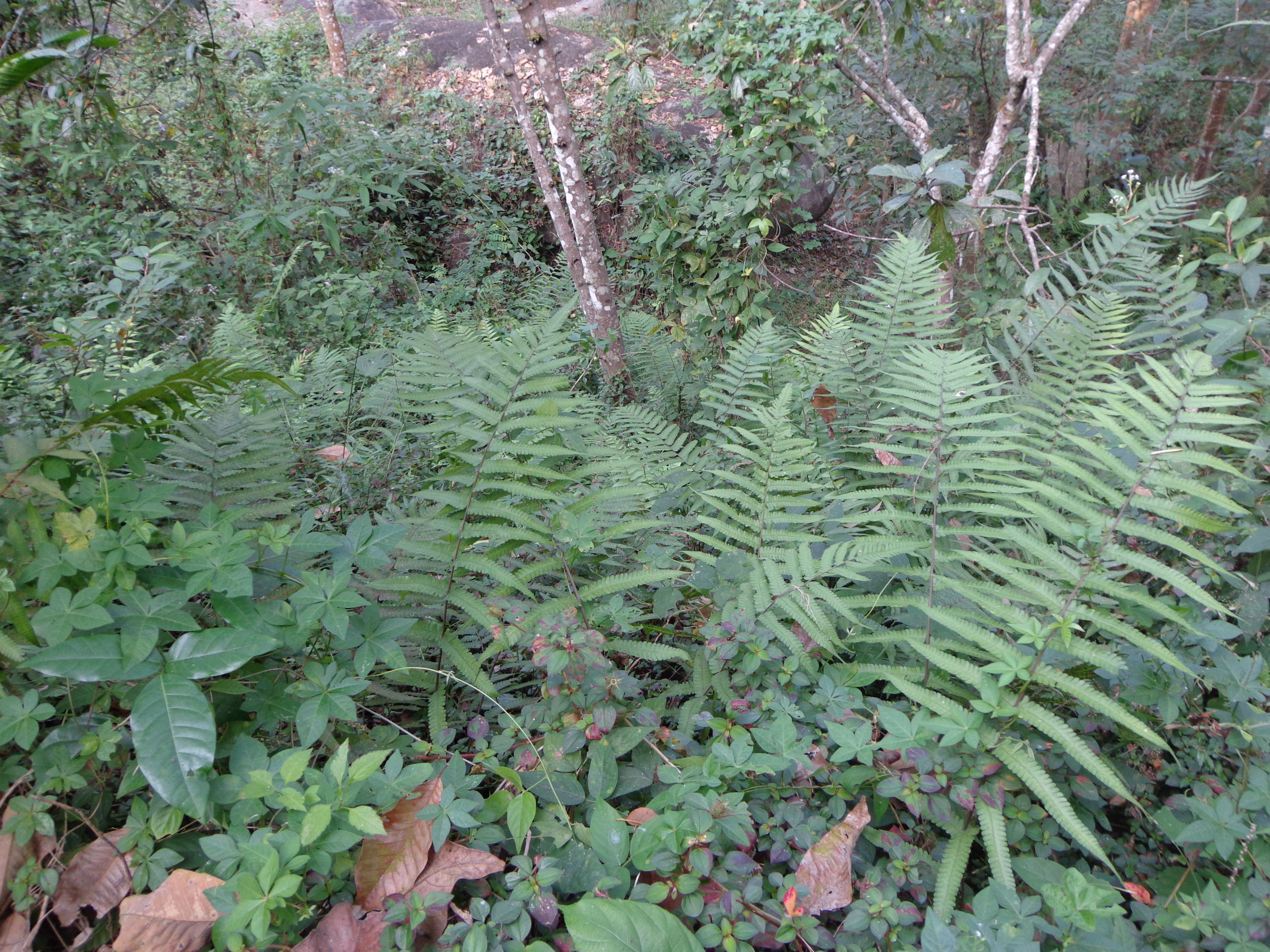
Botanical Garden at the M S Swaminathan Research Foundation Regional Center at Kalpetta

A regional centre of M.S. Swaminathan Research Foundation (MSSRF) is located at Puthoorvayal, about 3 km from Kalpetta town-centre. The centre was established to promote community conservation systems of rural and tribal people through research, extension and advocacy. Centre works in partnership with rural and farming communities for sustainable agricultural and rural development. Operational area of the centre is confined to the Western Ghats regions in Kerala. The Botanic Garden and Butterfly Garden at the centre attracts a lot of visitors and students. Many rare and endangered species as well as plants local to the Western Ghats can be found in the Botanic Garden.

== Regional Coffee Research Station (RCRS) ==
The Regional Coffee Research Station, Wayanad is situated near Chundale within Kalpetta municipal limits. This establishment is under the Coffee Board of India. The primary objective of this station is to develop appropriate technologies to suit the region where robusta is the dominant crop. Kerala is reckoned as the second largest coffee producing state in the country with robusta variety of coffee, and majority of coffee production of Kerala is from Wayanad. The station covers an area of 116 hectares (290 acres) with 30 hectares (74 acres) of farm with an adequate laboratory support for research.

The RCRS is a sub-center of Central Coffee Research Institute based at Chikmagalur district of Karnataka.

== Myladippara Trekking Centre ==
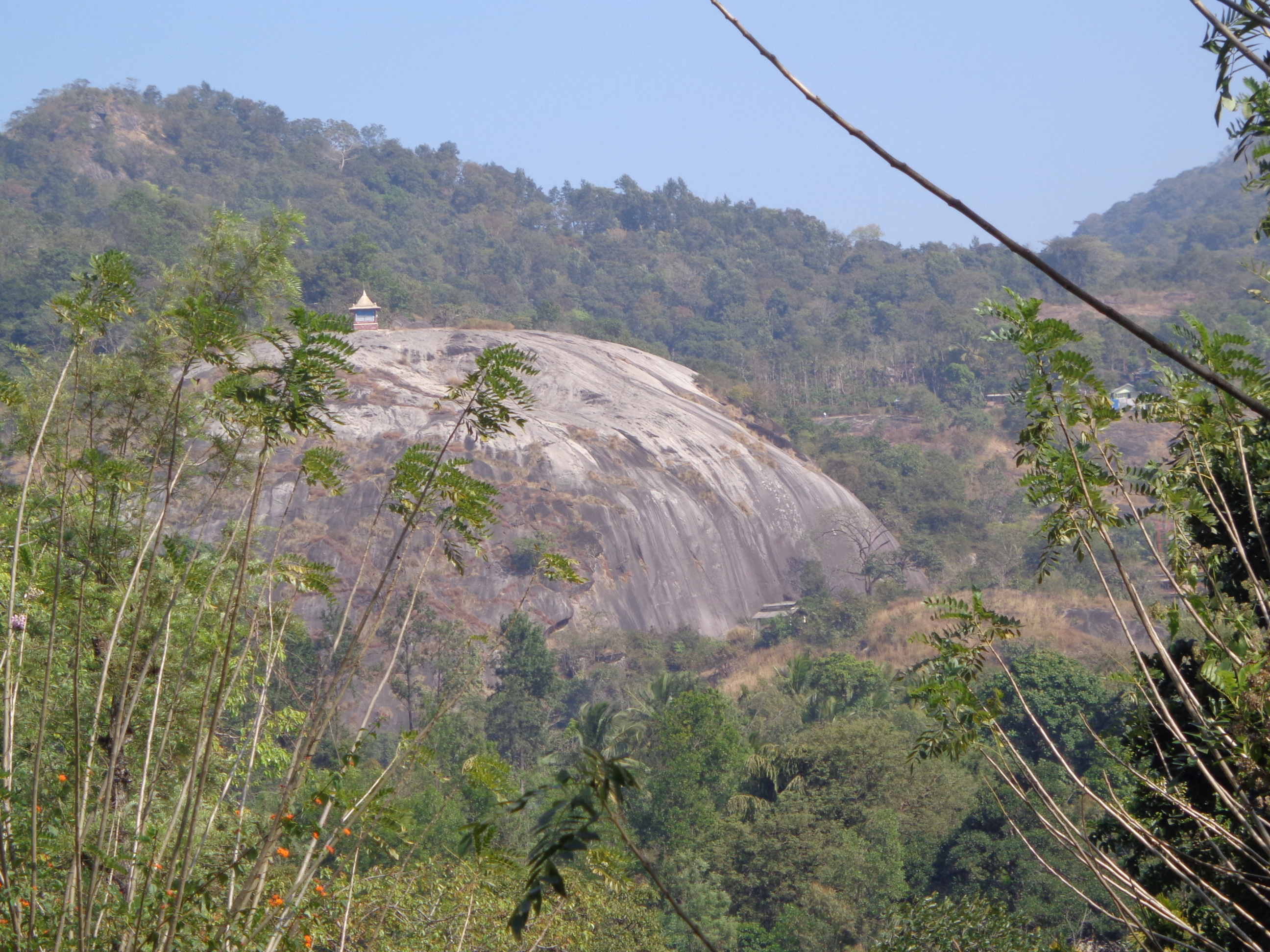
Myladippara

Myladippara is a cliff located to the east of Civil Station, adjacent to the new NH bypass road. Trek to the Myladippara offers a charming experience.

== Popular attractions in Kalpetta ==
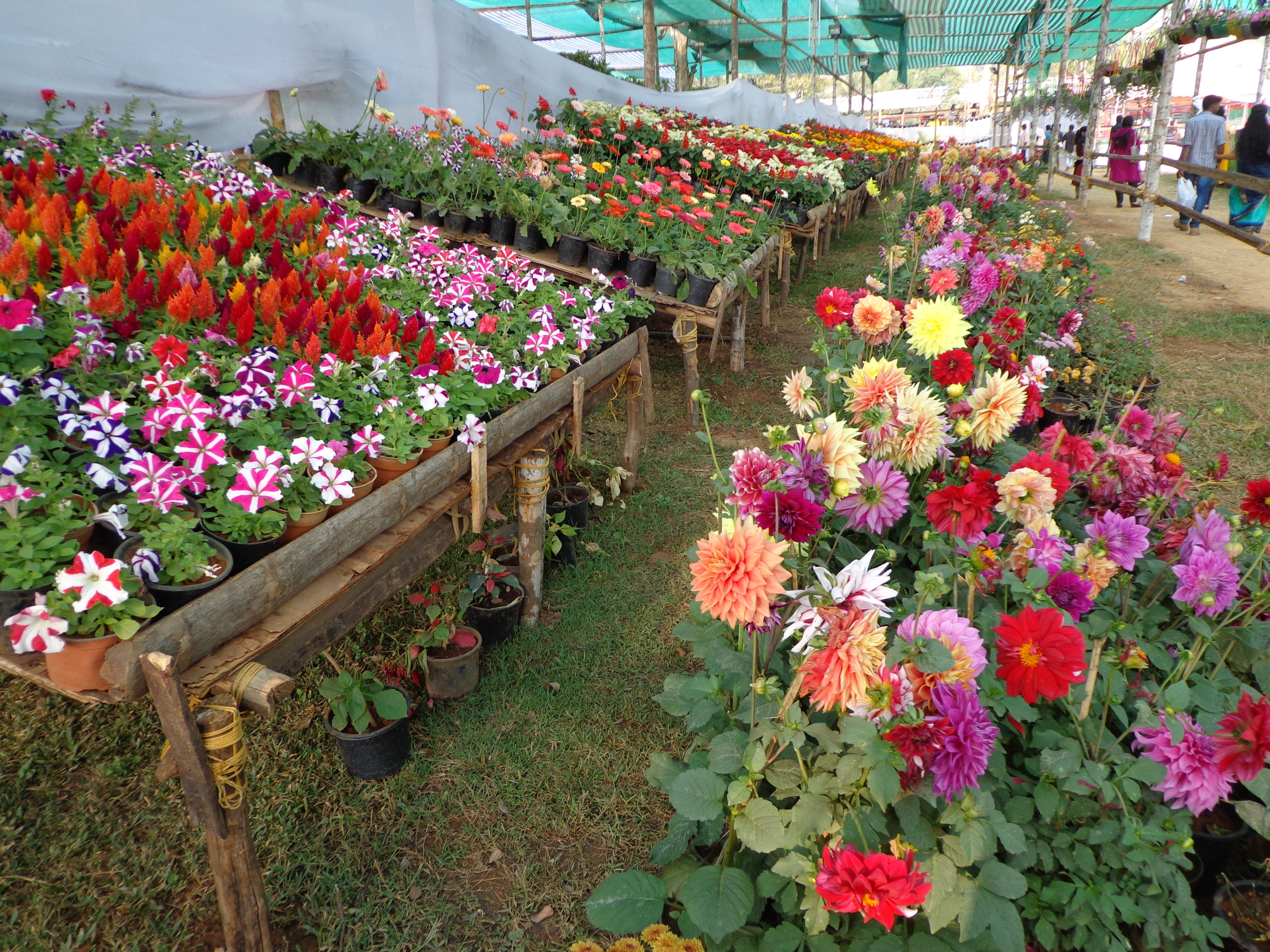
Wayanad Flower Show held at Kalpetta every December/January is a keenly awaited annual event

There are many attractions near Kalpetta. Below is the list of attractions grouped by the road direction from Kalpetta:

Towards Vythiri:

- Pookode Lake - 10 km
- Wayanad Ghat Road View Point - 16 km
- Chain Tree - 16

== Towards Padinjarethara ==
- Banasura Sagar Dam - 24 km - considered the largest earthen dam in India
- Philately and numismatics museum - adjacent to Banasura Sagar dam
- Karalad Lake - 16 km

== Towards Meppadi ==
- Soochipara Falls, also known as Sentinel Rock Falls - 20 km
- Meenmutty Falls - 25 km - 2 km jungle hike to spectacular waterfall
- Kanthanpara Falls - 22 km
- Chembra Peak - 17 km - a 2100-meter peak, the highest in the area
- Neelimala View Point -near Meenmutty Falls - 27 km
- Sunrise Valley - a great place to watch the rising and setting sun set amidst dramatic mountain scenery - 22 km

== Towards Sulthan Bathery ==
- Karapuzha Dam - 17 km
- Edakkal Caves - 28 km
- Chethalayam Falls - 37 km
- Muthanga Wildlife Sanctuary - 42 km
- Wayanad Heritage Museum, Ambalavayal - 25 km
- Uravu - an NGO that works in the area of indigenous sciences and technology. They run a successful bamboo crafts design and production centre along with a bamboo nursery - 12 km
- Sulthan Bathery Jain Temple - 24
- RARS (Regional Agricultural Research Station) - 25 km
- Phantom Rock - 26 km

== Towards Mananthavady ==
- Kuruva Islands - 40 km
- Tholpetty Wildlife Sanctuary - 59
- Pakshipathalam - 71 km
- Pazhassi Raja's Tomb - 35 km
- Thirunelli Temple - 64 km
- Papanasini, Thirunelli - 64 km
- Pallikkunnu Church - 19 km
- Korome Mosque - 47 km
- Jain Temples (Ruined) at Punchavayal and Puthenangadi (near Panamaram) - 20 km
- Valliyoorkav Bhagavathi Temple - 24 km
- Seetha Lava-Kusha Temple - 50 km
- Thrissilery Shiva Temple - 50 km
- Brahmagiri - a 1608-meter peak (Actually, situated with in borders of Karnataka State) - 61 km
- Paingatteri Agraharam -a settlement of Tamil Brahmins organised in the classic architectural typology of row houses - 28 km
