= State Highway 29 (Kerala) =

Highway in Kerala, India

State Highway 29
- Kozhikode - Vythiri - Gudallur Road
- SH 29 highlighted in red

Route information
- Maintained by Kerala Public Works Department
- Length: 30 km (19 mi)

Major junctions
- West end: NH 766 in Chundale
- East end: SH 12 at TN border near Vaduvanchal

Location
- Country: India
- State: Kerala
- Districts: Wayanad

Highway system
- Roads in India; Expressways; National; State; Asian; State Highways in Kerala
← SH 28	→ SH 30

State Highway 29 (SH 29) is a state highway in Kerala, India that starts at junction of NH 766 at Chundale near Kalpetta and ends in Kerala State Boundary with Tamil Nadu. This highway was originally Kozhikode - Vythiri - State Border and was 97 km long. After the section of the highway from Kozhikode until Chundale became part of NH 212, this highway is now 31.0 km long.

This highway now passes through only Wayanad district.

== Route ==
NH 212 - Chundale - Meppadi - Vaduvanchal - Choladi - State Boundary - Road to Gudalur & Ooty

== See also ==
- Roads in Kerala
- List of state highways in Kerala
