= St. Jude's Church, Chundale =

St.Jude’s Church, Chundale
- St Jude’s Shrine Chundale
- Chundale Pally
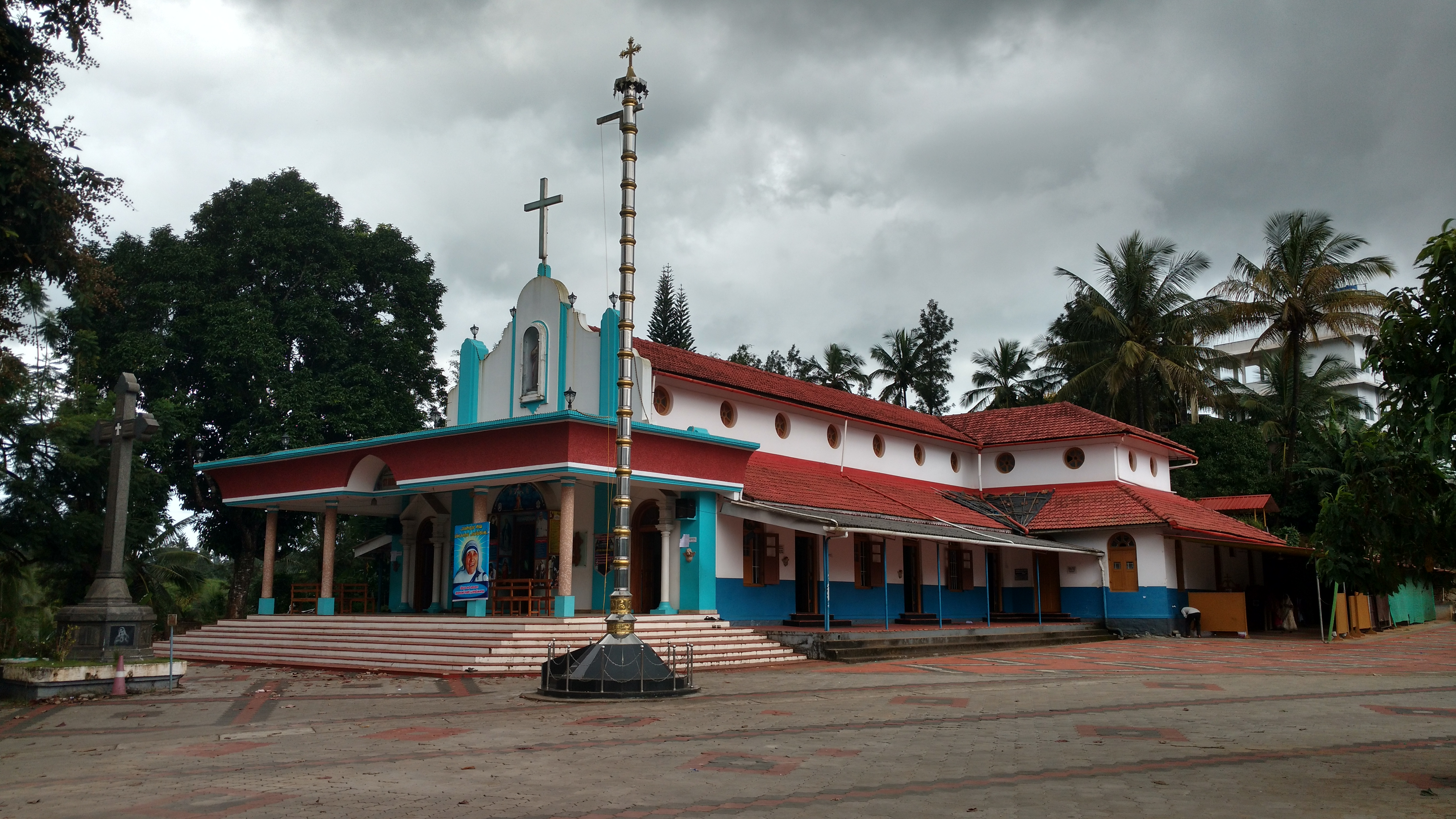

- Location in Kerala, India
- 11°34′31″N 76°03′37″E
- Country: India
- Denomination: Latin Catholic Church
- Tradition: Eastern Catholic Churches

History
- Founded: 1925
- Founder: Fr Victor de Rozario
- Dedication: St.Jude Thaddaeus
- Dedicated: 1925

Architecture
- Architect: Mr. T. M. D’Cruz
- Completed: 1953

Administration
- Diocese: Roman Catholic Diocese of Calicut

Clergy
- Bishop: Most. Rev. Dr. Varghese Chakkalakal

St.Jude’s Church, Chundale is a Roman Catholic Church located at Chundale, Wayanad, Kerala under the Diocese of Calicut. This Shrine is a pilgrim centre of North Kerala. The walls of the church are decorated by the paintings of Brother Angelo Bignami, with incidents of traditions believed to be performed by St Jude.

== Feasts ==
The Annual Feast of St.Jude is celebrated on the Second Sunday of January Every Year.
