= Vaduvanchal =

- village
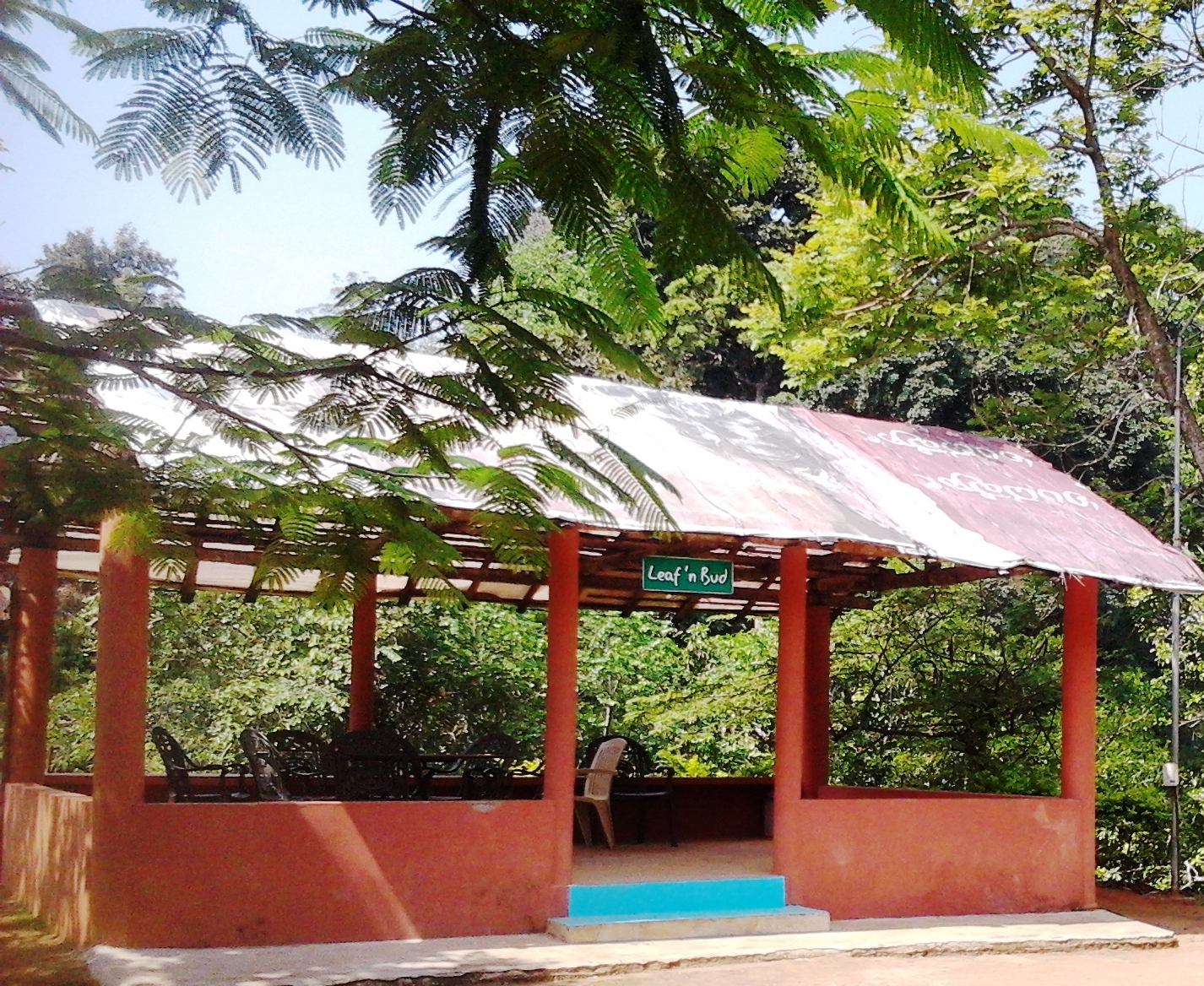
- Meenmutty Falls

- Location in Kerala, India Vaduvanchal (India)
- Coordinates: 11°32′59″N 76°13′44″E
- Country: India
- State: Kerala
- District: Wayanad

Government
  - Body: Panchayat

Languages
  - Official: Malayalam
- Time zone: UTC+5:30 (IST)
- PIN: 673581
- Telephone code: 04936
- Vehicle registration: KL-73
- Nearest city: Sulthan Bathery
- Lok Sabha constituency: Wayanad
- Civic agency: Panchayat

Vaduvanchal is a small town in Wayanad district in the state of Kerala, India. It is situated in the Kozhikode-Ooty road. The town is part of the Muppainad Panchayat.

== Tourism ==
The region is full of plantations, primarily tea, coffee and rubber. The Meenmutty waterfalls and Sunrise Valley are near to the town. There are several homestays and resorts in the region, due to its proximity to tourist destinations.

== See also ==
- Chundale town
- Kalpetta town
- Mango Orange village
- Meppadi town
