= Meppadi =

- Town
- Meppadi
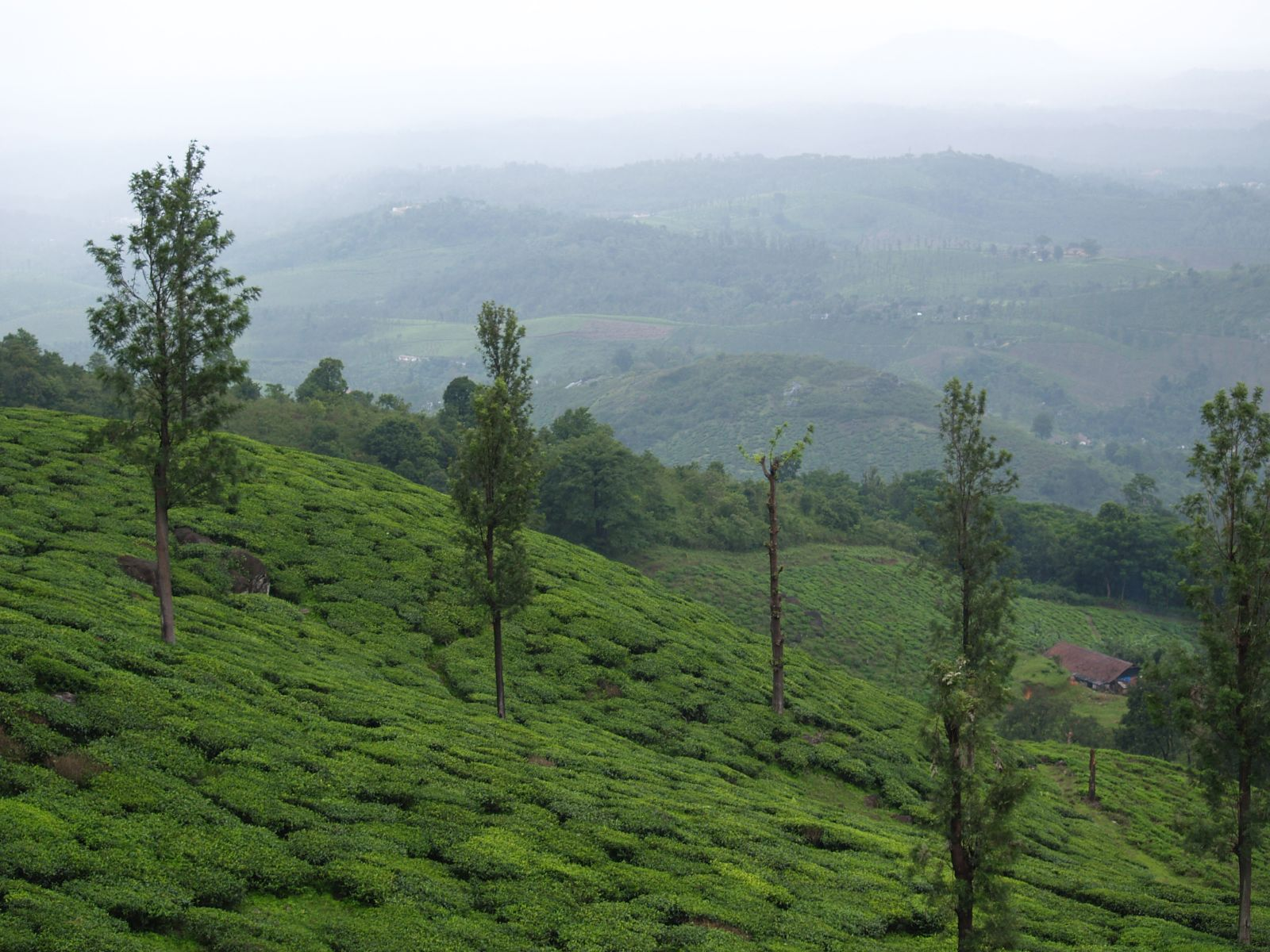

- Location within Kerala
- Coordinates: 11.55786°N 76.13199°E
- Country: India
- State: Kerala

Government
  - Type: Panchayat Raj
  - Body: Meppadi Grama Panchayat
- Time zone: UTC+5:30 (IST)

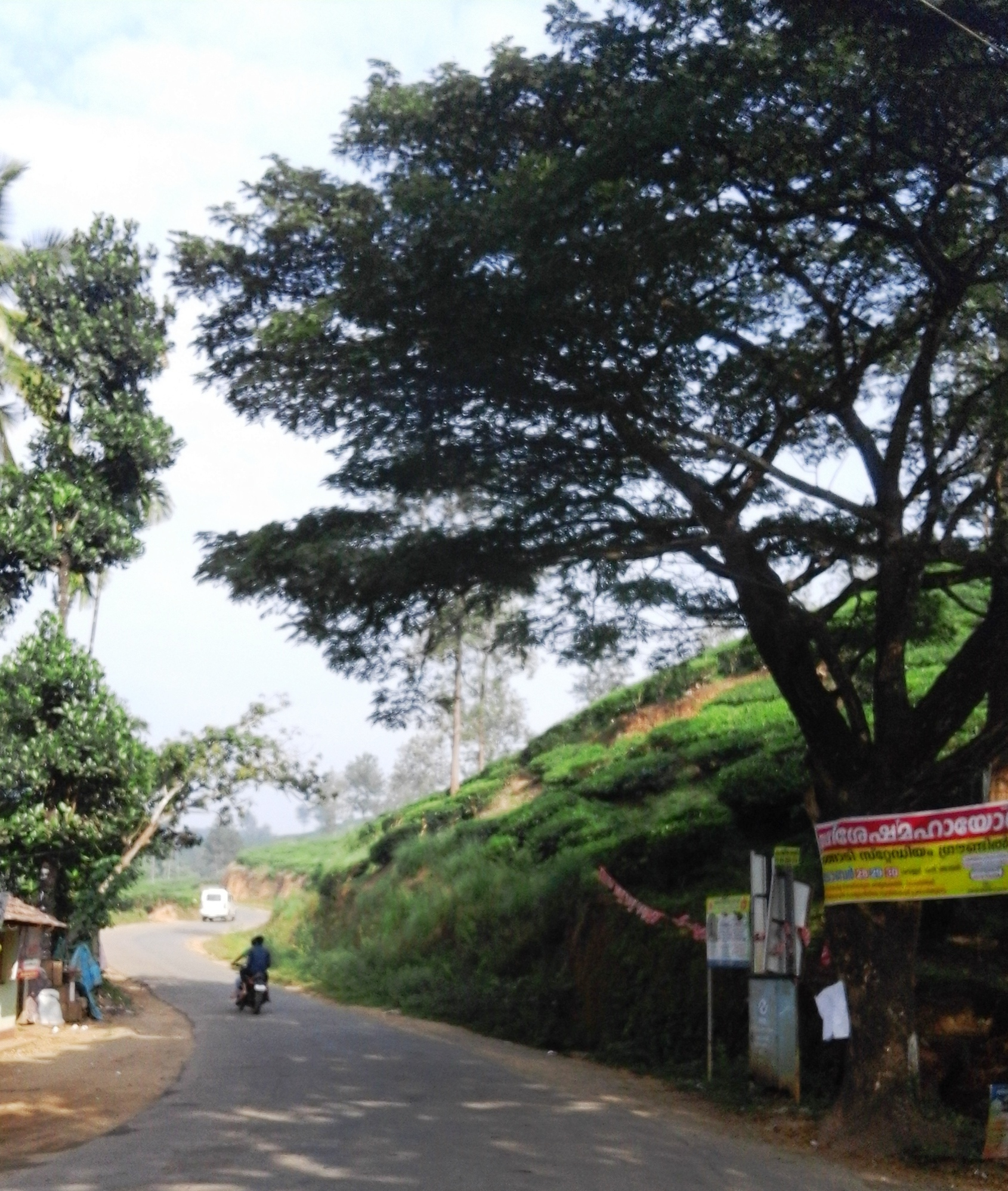
Onnam Mile, Meppadi

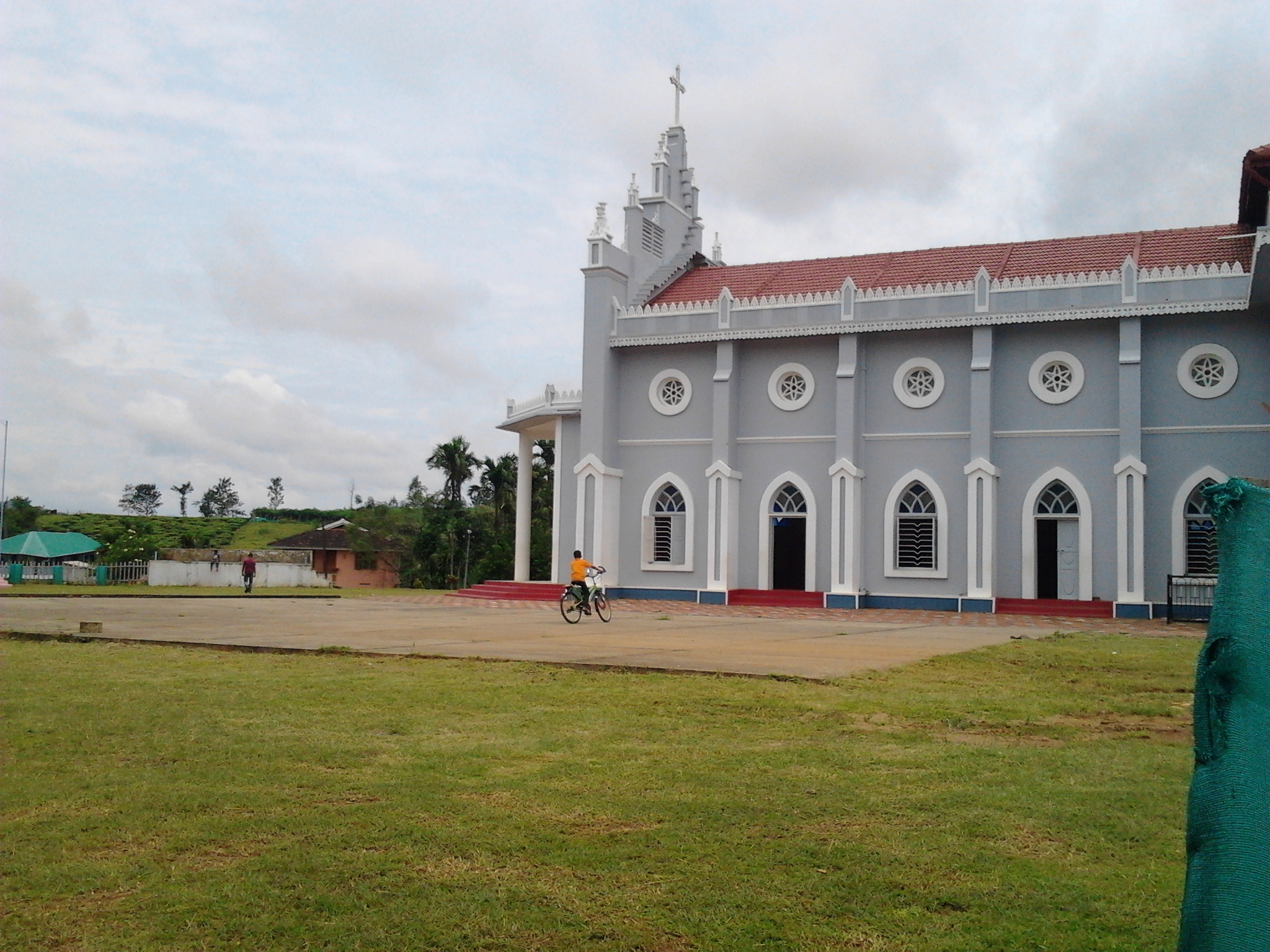
St.Josephs Church, Meppadi

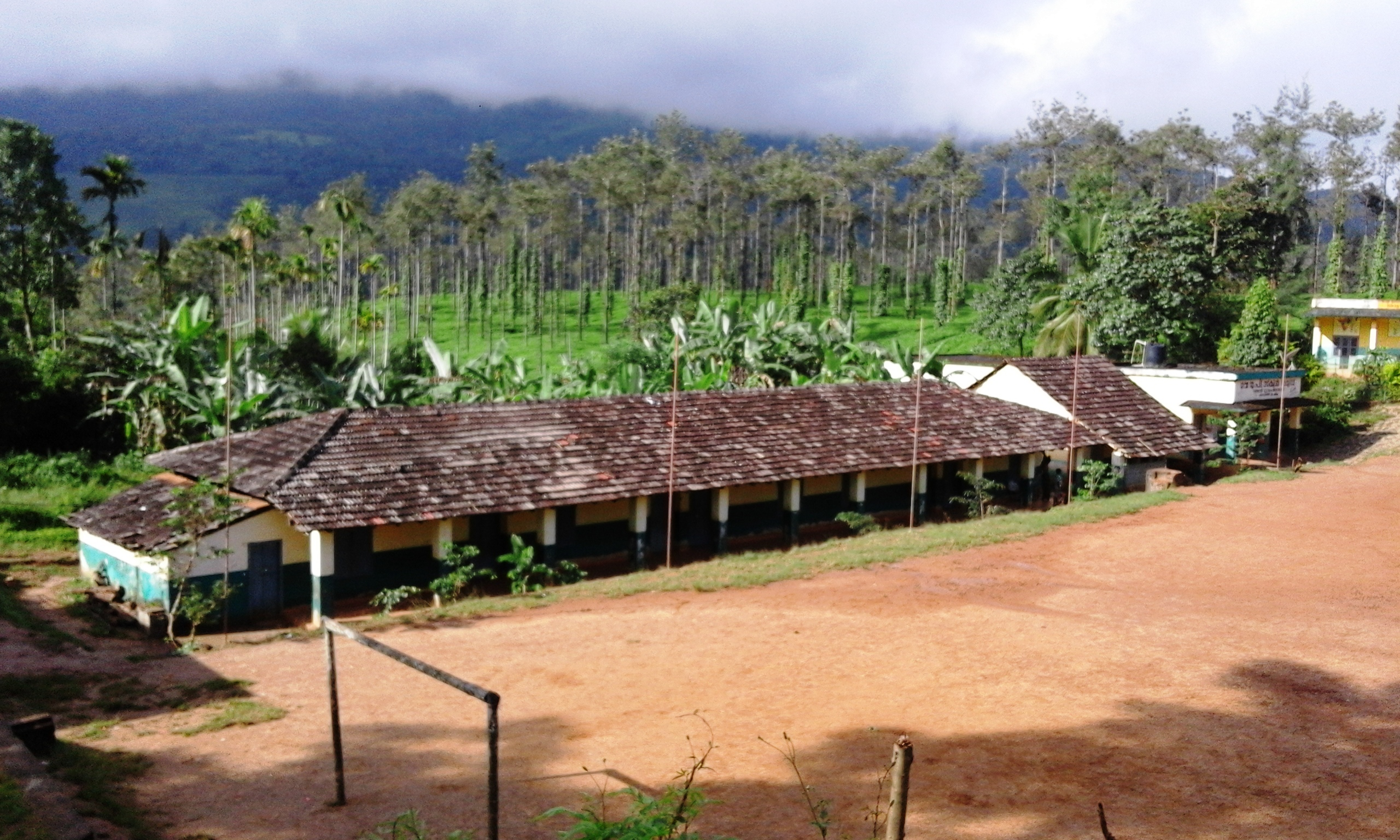
School on Chundale Road, Meppadi

Meppadi is a small town in the Indian state of Kerala. It is a scenic hill station on the State Highway between Kozhikode and Ooty. The nearest city is Kalpetta, which is the headquarters of the Wayanad revenue district.

== History ==
=== 2024 Landslides ===
In July 2024, Meppadi was one of the villages in Wayanad district most affected by deadly landslides.

== Economy ==
Tea cultivation is the main economic activity of Meppadi village. There are also some vegetable cultivation on small scale. Most of the people living in Meppadi are workers in various tea estates where they cultivate cardamom too. There is a small town catering to locals and the tourists. The tourists come to enjoy the salubrious climate of the place.

== Distance ==
Meppadi is 12 km from Kalpetta town in the Wayanad District. It is 78 km from Kozhikode (Calicut), 81 km from Nilambur, and 106 km from Ooty, and 281 km from Bangalore.

== Tourist attractions ==
- Kanthanpara Water falls
- 900 Kandi
- Soochipara Falls
- Meenmutty Falls, Wayanad
- Edakkal Caves
- Pookot Lake
- Chembra Peak
- Karapuzha Dam
- Vellarimala
- Sunrise valley
- Karapuzha Dam
- Thanhilode

== Image gallery ==
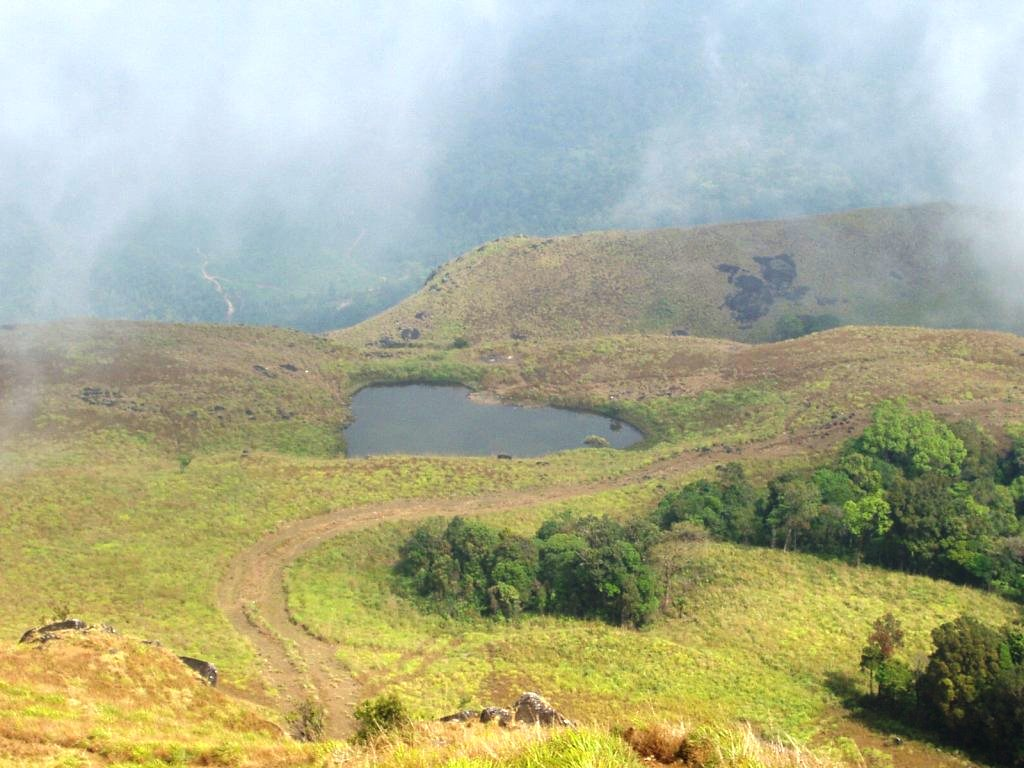
Chembra

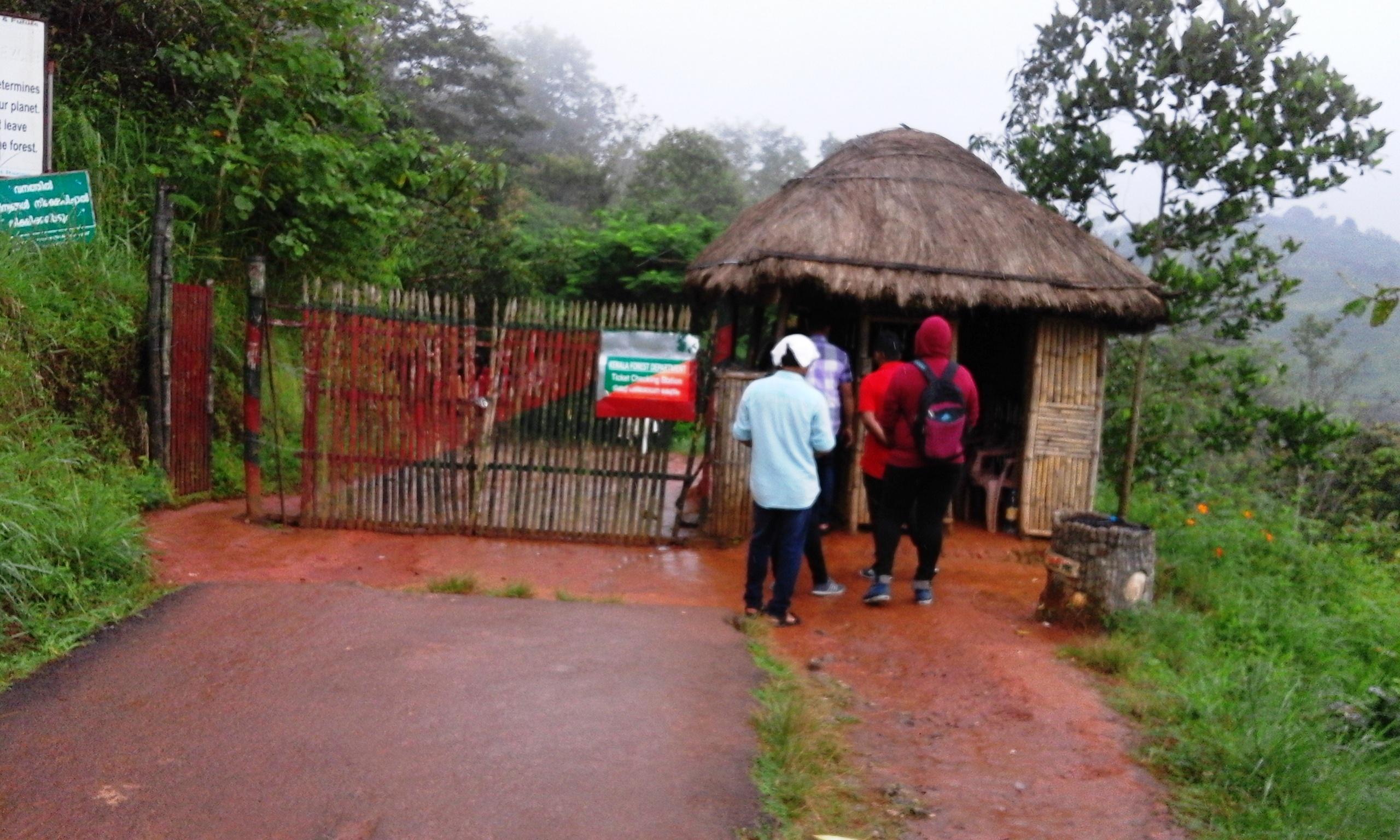
Entering Soochippara

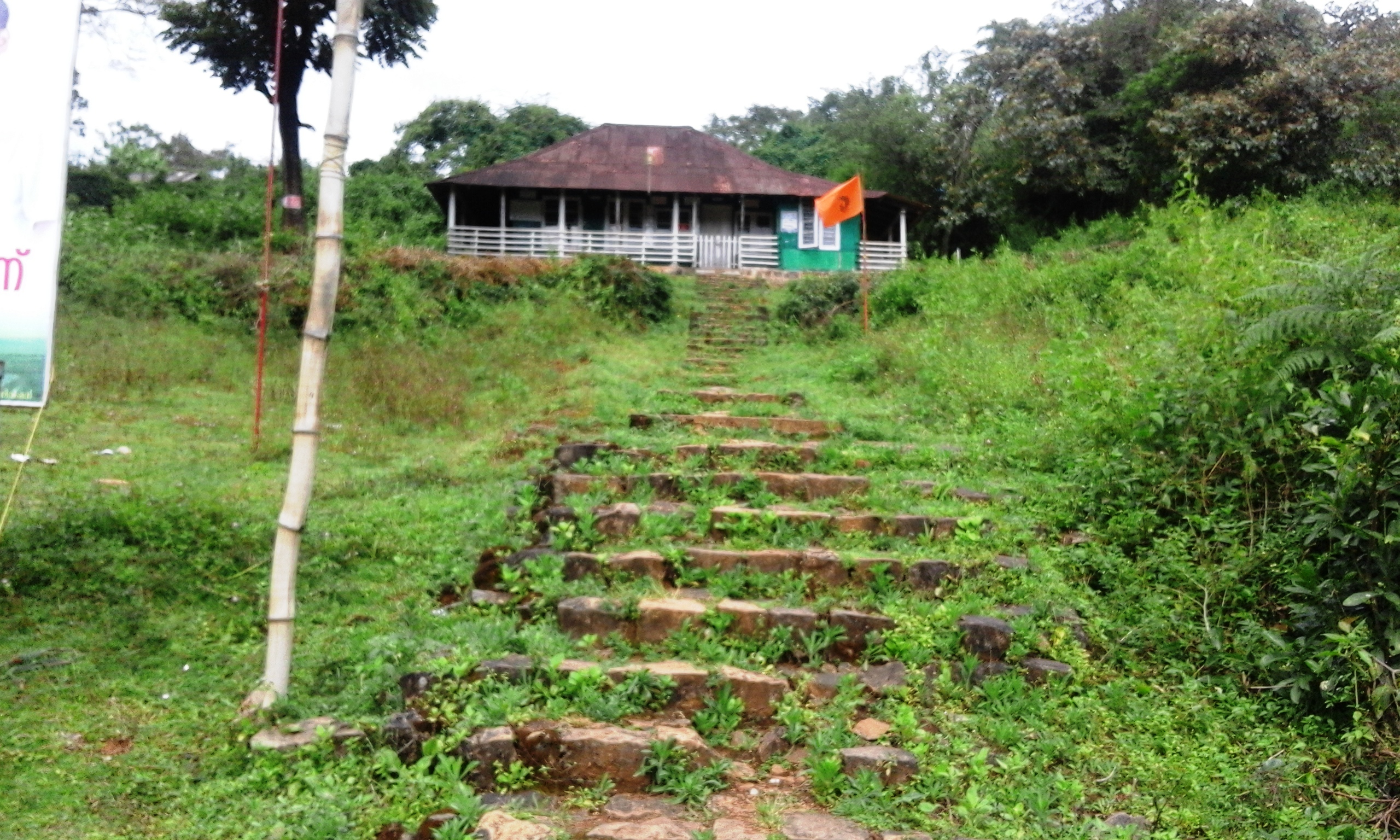
Muster Office

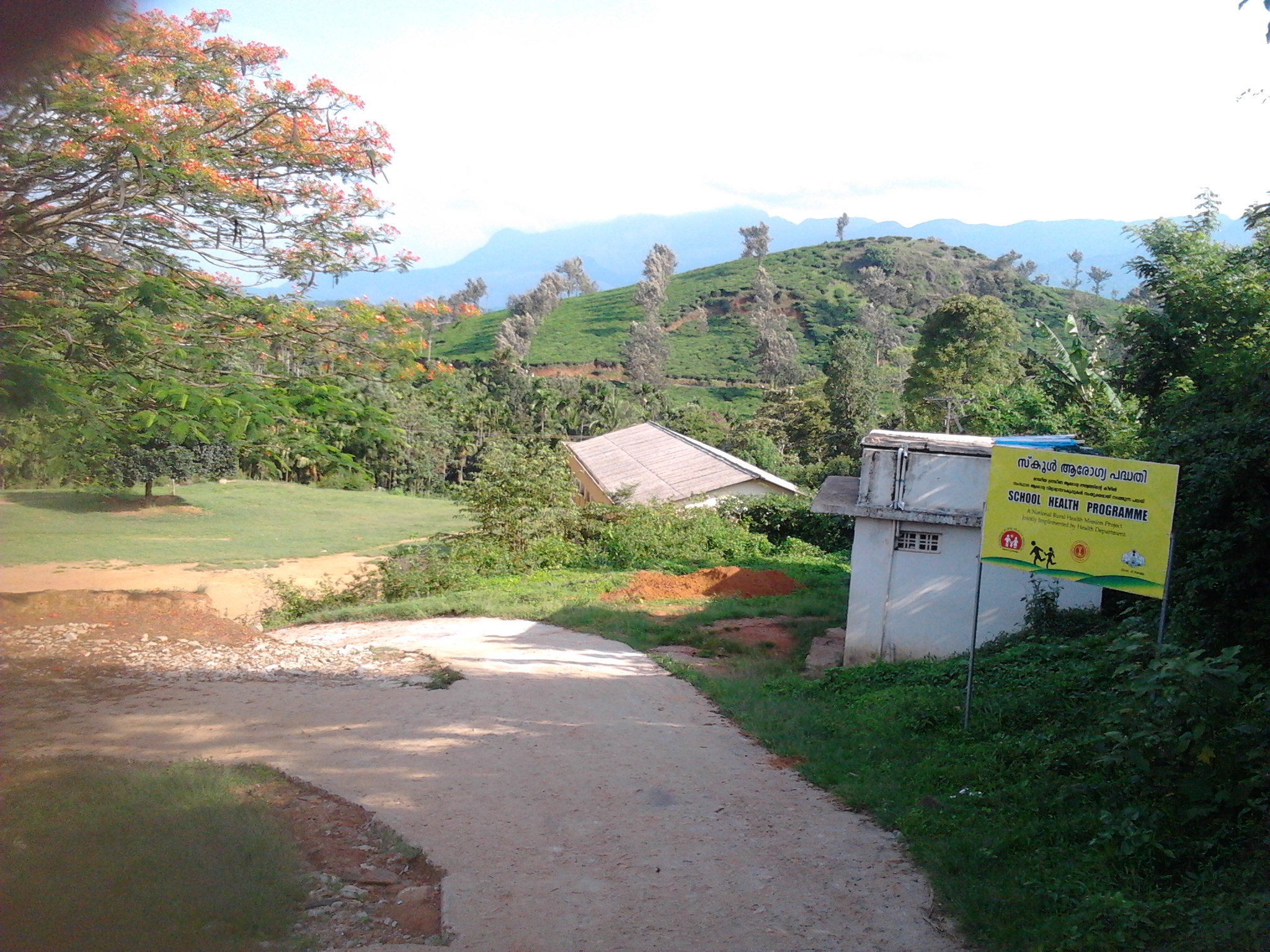
St.Josephs School

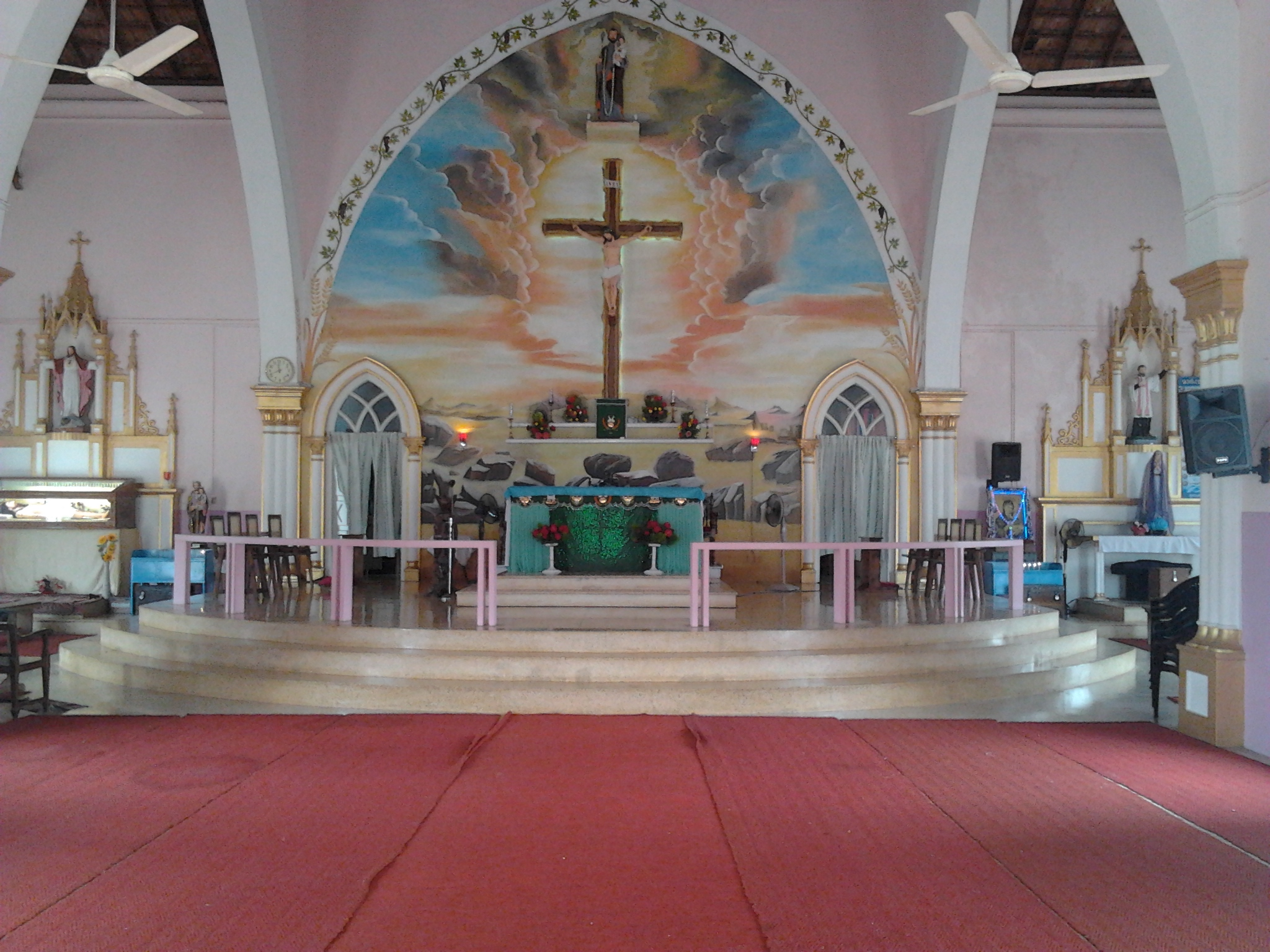
Inside the St.Joseph Church

== See also ==
- Chundale town
- Kalpetta town
- Mango Orange village
- Vaduvanchal town
