= Poozhithode =

- gramam
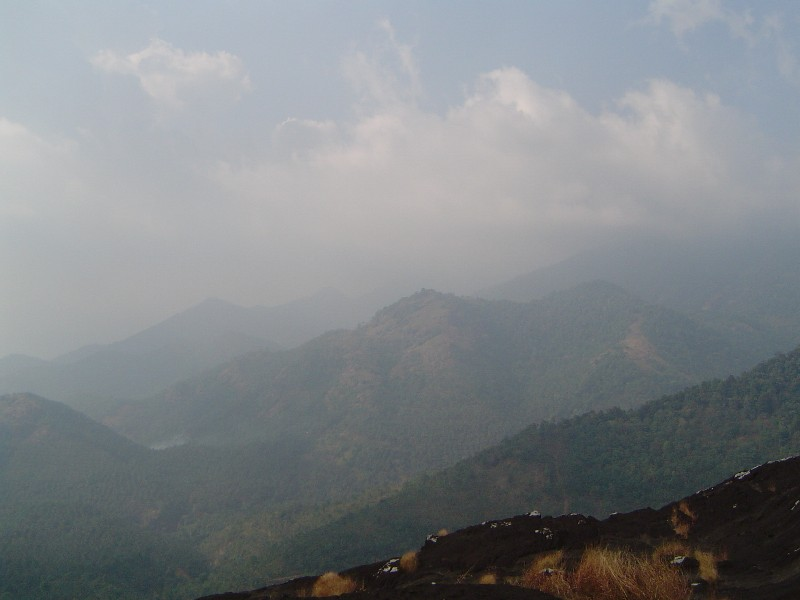
- Pottiapara

- Location in Kerala, India Poozhithode (India)
- Coordinates: 11.643°N 75.8540565°E
- Country: India
- State: Kerala
- District: Kozhikode

Population (2006)
  - Total: 2,537

Languages
  - Official: Malayalam, English
- Time zone: UTC+5:30 (IST)
- PIN: 673 528
- Telephone code: +91 496
- Vehicle registration: KL-77
- Website: www.kozhikode.nic.in

Poozhithode is a village located at the easternmost end of Calicut, Kerala, India. It is a hill country and is about 65 km from Calicut located in Chakittapara panchayath. Poozhithode has on its one side Kadunthara puzha and on the other side Wyanad forest.

== Overview ==
Poozhithode seems to come under an area rich in minerals. The pattern of natural events like lightning etc. seem to point out to the presence of some minerals. The study of mining and geology indicates some iron ore in the area.

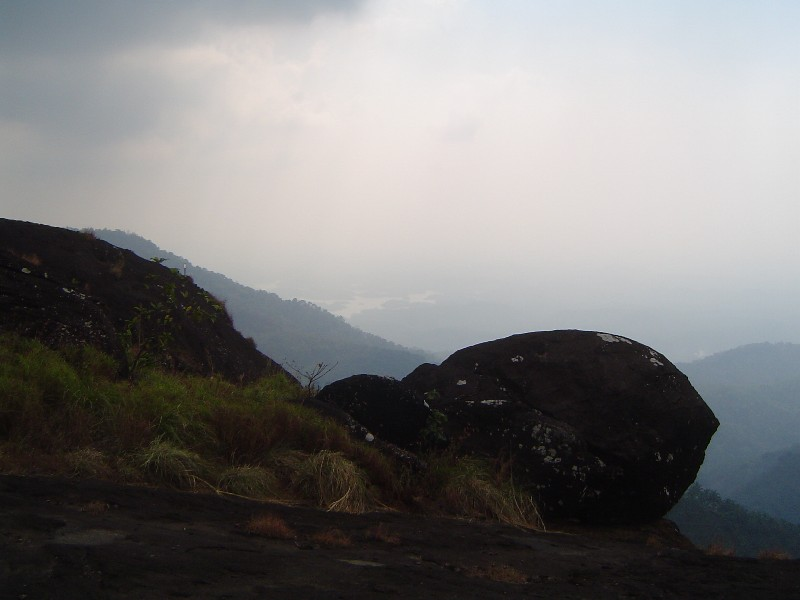
Pottiyapara

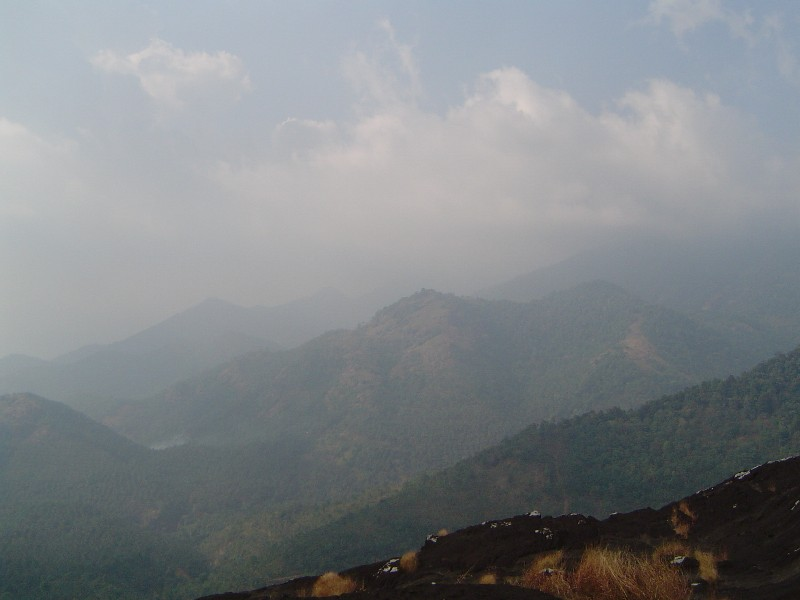
Pottiyapara2

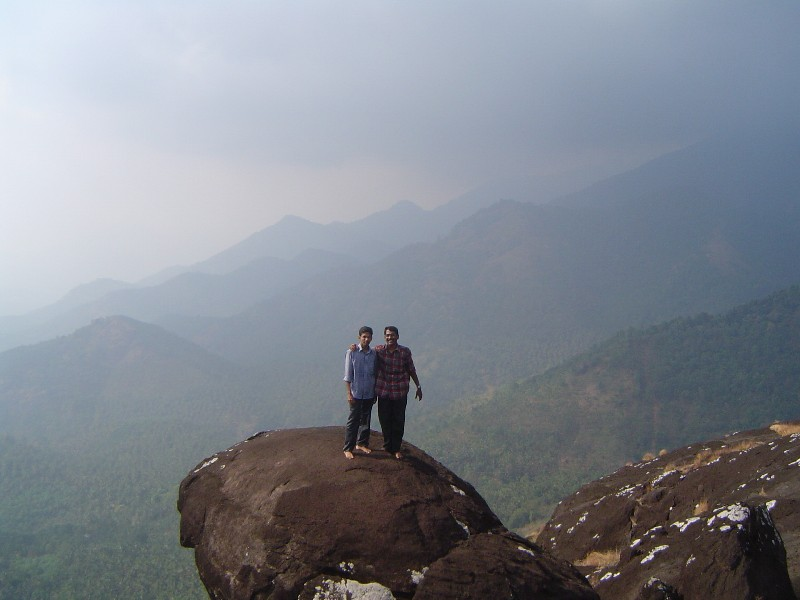
Pottiyapara2
