= Mango Orange =

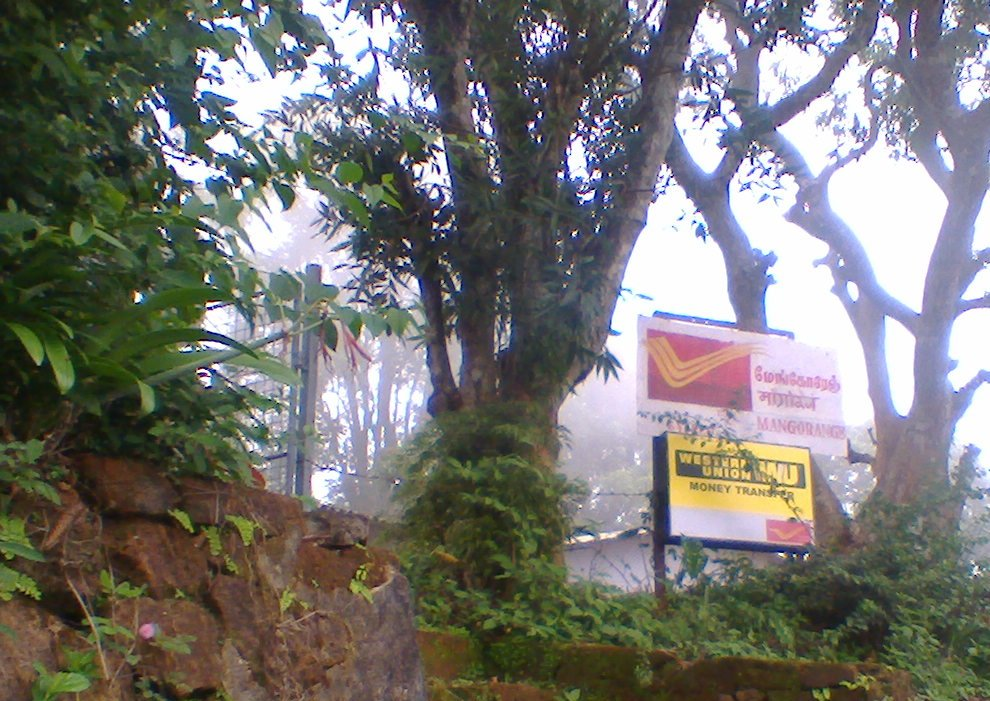
The post office at the Mango Orange village

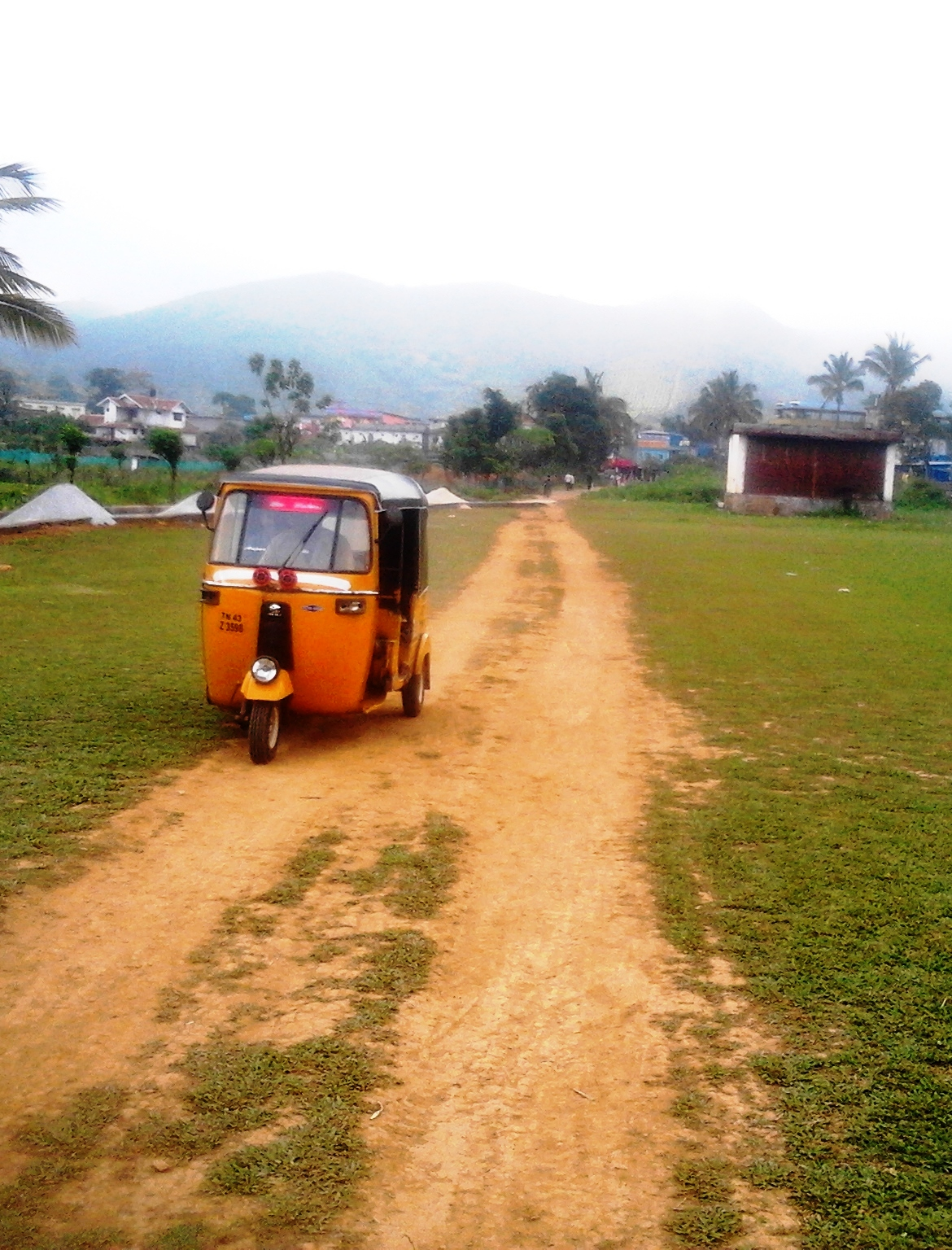
Village scene from Mangorange

Mango Orange, officially spelt ‘mangorange’, is a small village in the Nilgiris district of Tamil Nadu, India. The village is dominated by tea estates. Most of the population is employed in the tea estates and there are a few schools, churches and mosques dotted around the undulating terrain.

== Location ==
Mango Orange village is 30 km from Sulthan Bathery in Kerala and 25 km from Gudalur in the Tamil Nadu State of India. It is located at an altitude of 880 metres above sea level.

== History ==
During the nineteenth century, a London-based mining company made a township in the village and also built a Christian church and a race course. When there was no further scope for mining, the British investors shifted to plantations. Coffee and tea plantations were created in a massive scale. Many European people settled here and supervised the work. A large number of Indians from the Malabar region were employed in the estates.

Mango Orange
- Tourist Village
- Interactive map of Mango Orange
- Coordinates: 11.49676°N 76.33597°E
- Country: India
- State: Tamil Nadu
- District: Nilgiris

== Demography ==
At present, the whole village is dominated by tea estates of Tantea or Tamil Nadu Tea Plantation Corporation Limited, Harrisons Malayalam Limited of the RPG Group and Parry Agro Industries Ltd of the Murugappa Group. This village is a sacred place for the aboriginal communities like the Paniyas, Kurumbas and Kattu Nayakas. Today the population of the village is a mixture of migrated Sri Lankan Tamils, Gowdas and Kerala Muslims. The village is famous for small-scale gold mining activities conducted by the tribal people.

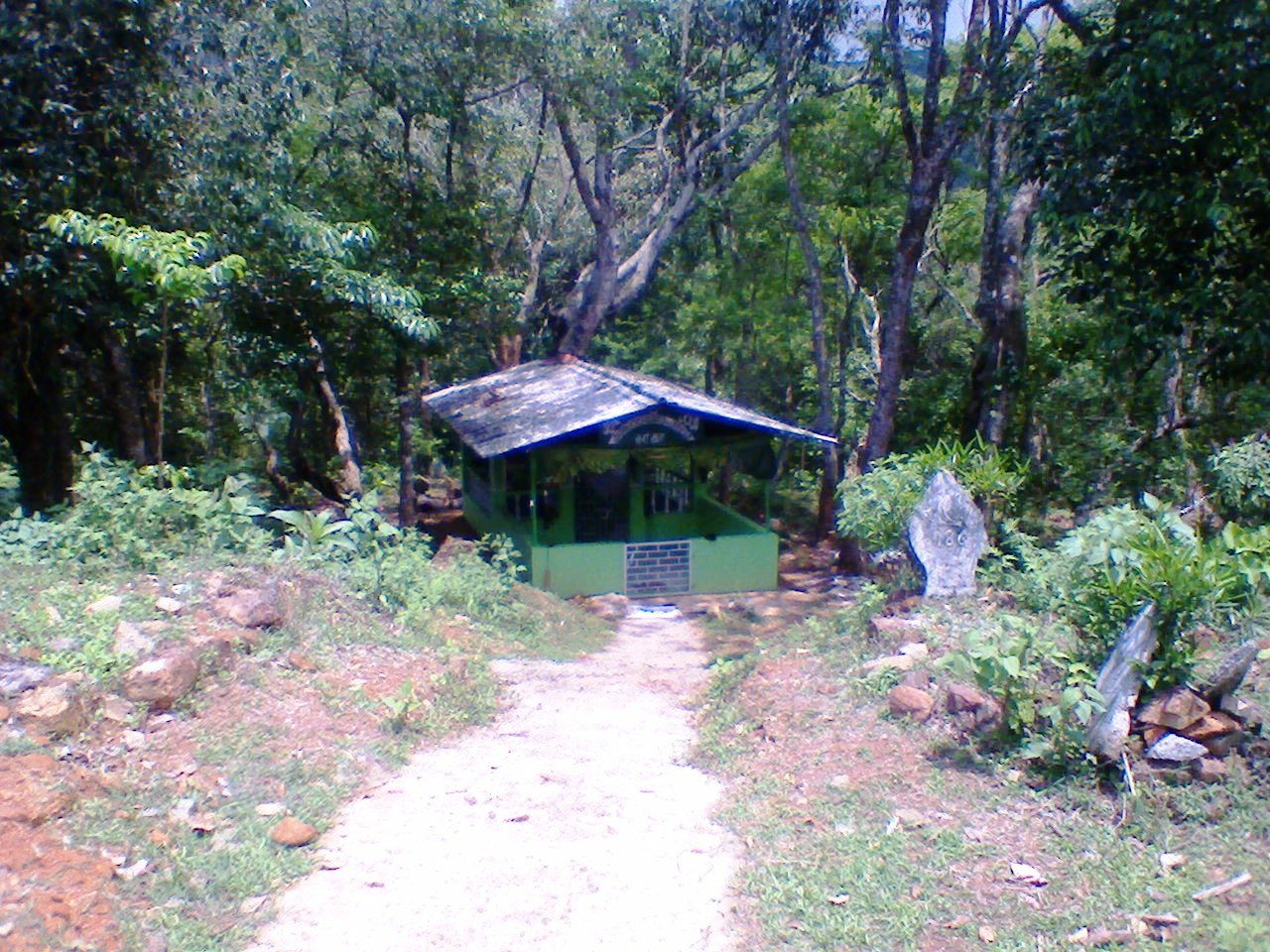
A Dargah in Mango Orange village, India

== Elephant attacks ==
In 2016, Mango Orange village filled national headlines because of a series of deaths from elephant attacks.

== Gene Pool Garden ==
The Tropical Gene Pool at Nadugani junction, with an area of 2424 acres, boasts 47,000 species of plants. Also found here are a museum of butterflies. accommodation, and trekking facilities.

== See also ==
- Pandalur
- Nelliyalam
- Devala
- Gudalur city
- Vaduvanchal town
- Meppadi town
