= Karapuzha Dam =

Dam in Wayanad, Kerala, India

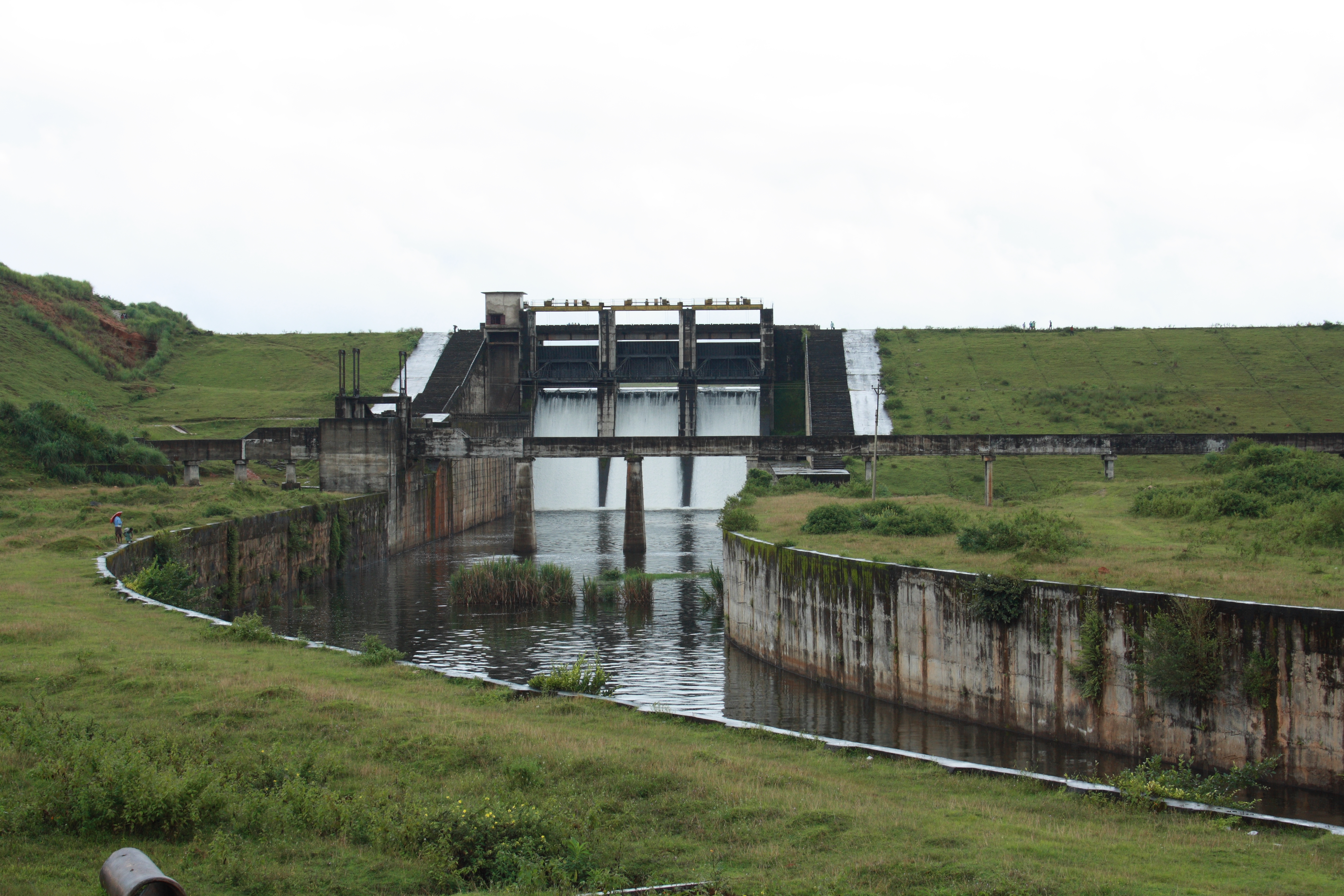
- Upstream face of the dam

- Location within India Location within Kerala Location within Karnataka Location within Tamil Nadu
- Official name: Karapuzha Dam
- Country: India
- Location: Wayanad, Kerala
- Coordinates: 11°37′03.13″N 76°10′19.34″E
- Purpose: Irrigation
- Status: Operational
- Construction began: 1977; 49 years ago
- Opening date: 2004; 22 years ago

Dam and spillways
- Type of dam: Embankment, earth-fill
- Impounds: Karapuzha River
- Height: 28 m (92 ft)
- Length: 625 m (2,051 ft)
- Spillway type: Ogee, radial gate-controlled
- Spillway capacity: 969 m^{3}/s (34,220 cu ft/s)

Reservoir
- Total capacity: 76,500,000 m^{3} (62,020 acre⋅ft)
- Active capacity: 72,000,000 m^{3} (58,371 acre⋅ft)
- Inactive capacity: 4,500,000 m^{3} (3,648 acre⋅ft)
- Surface area: 8.55 km^{2} (3 mi^{2})
- Normal elevation: 763 m (2,503 ft)

Karapuzha Dam located in the Wayanad district of Kerala, Karapuzha Dam is located in the greenish and natural regions of Wayanad, Kerala on the Karapuzha River, a tributary of the Kabini River. Construction on the dam began in 1977 and it was completed in 2004. The purpose of the dam is irrigation and its left and right bank canals are still under construction.

== Gallery ==
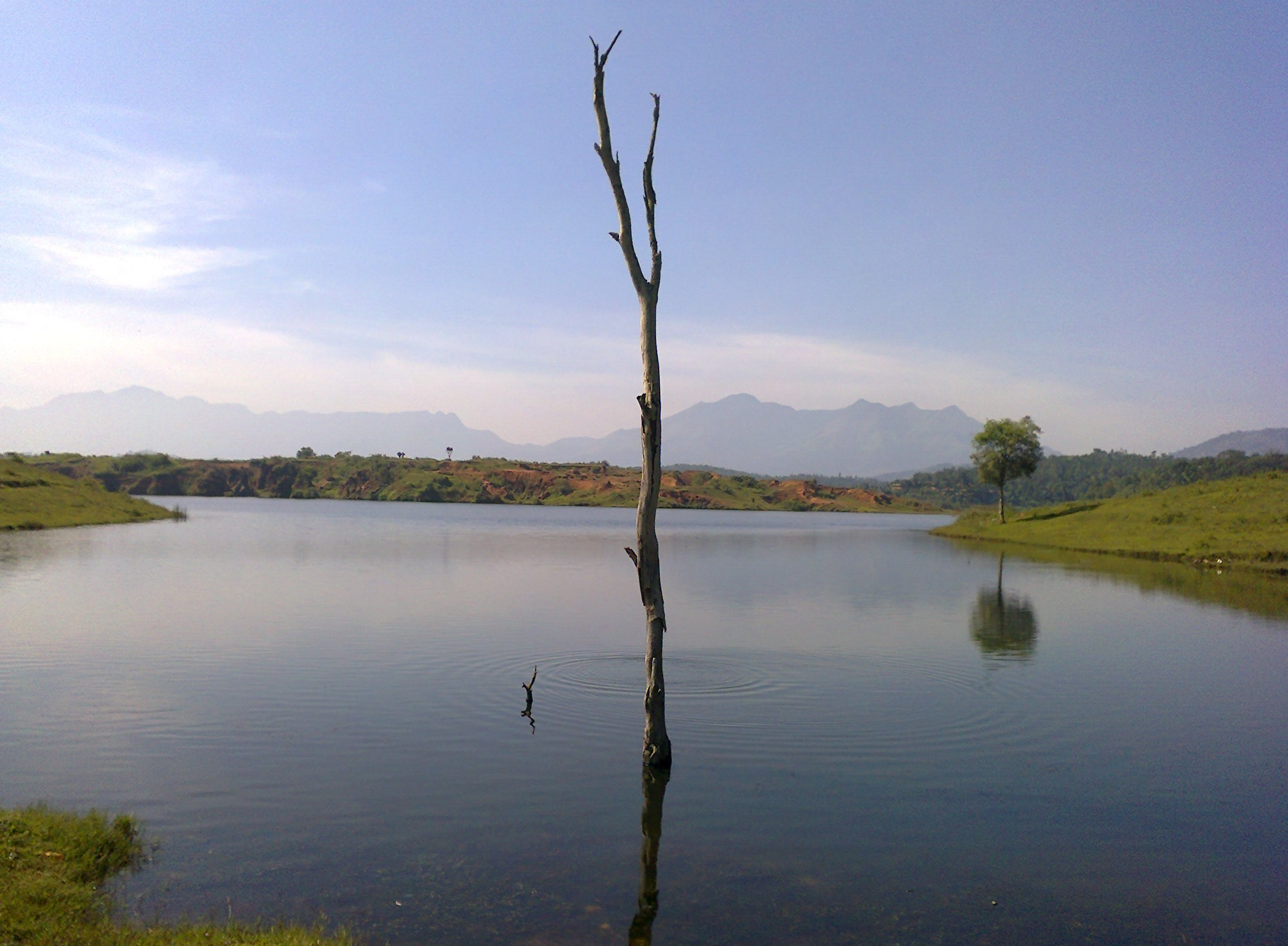
A view of Karapuzha Dam River

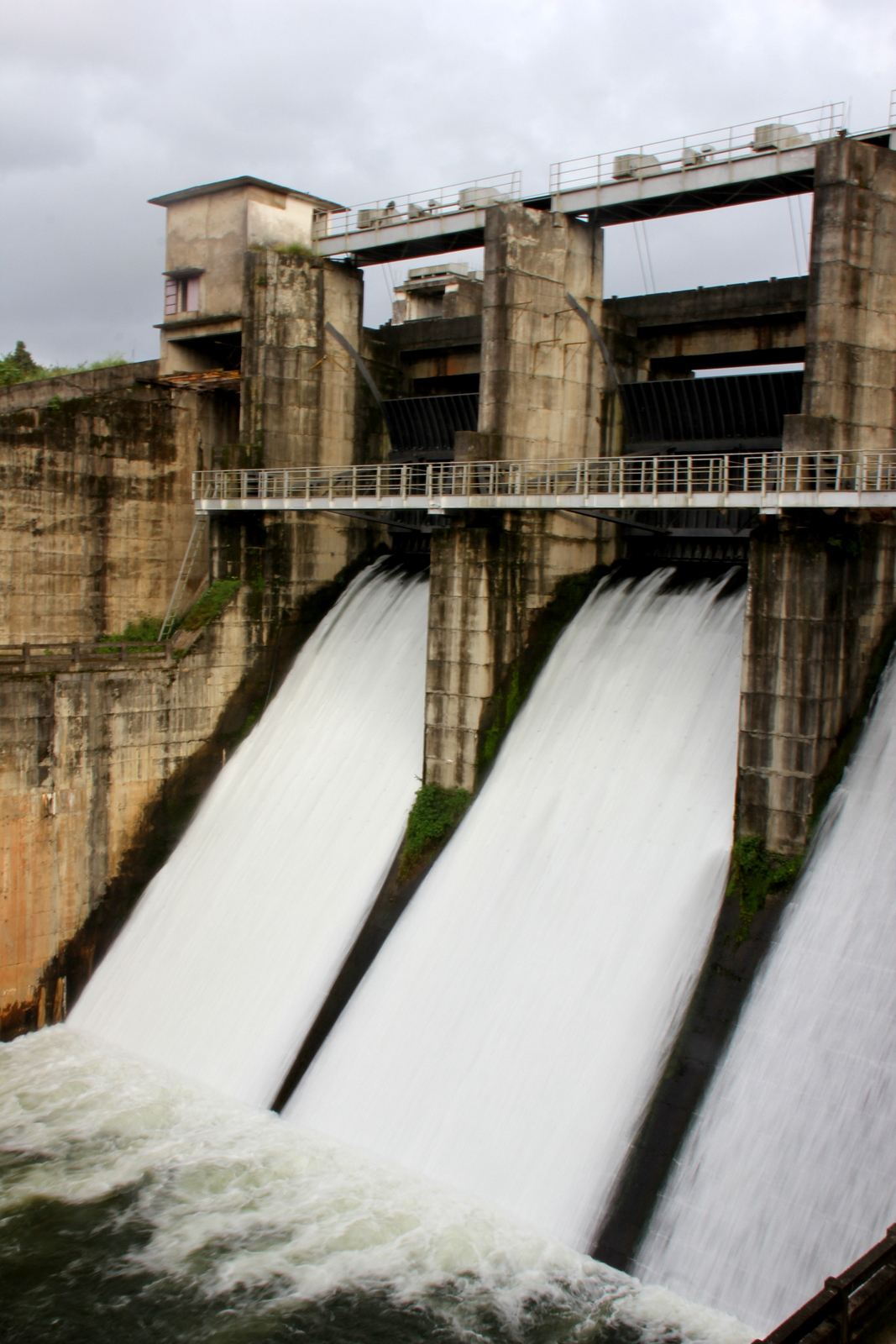
A view of Karapuzha Dam Shutters

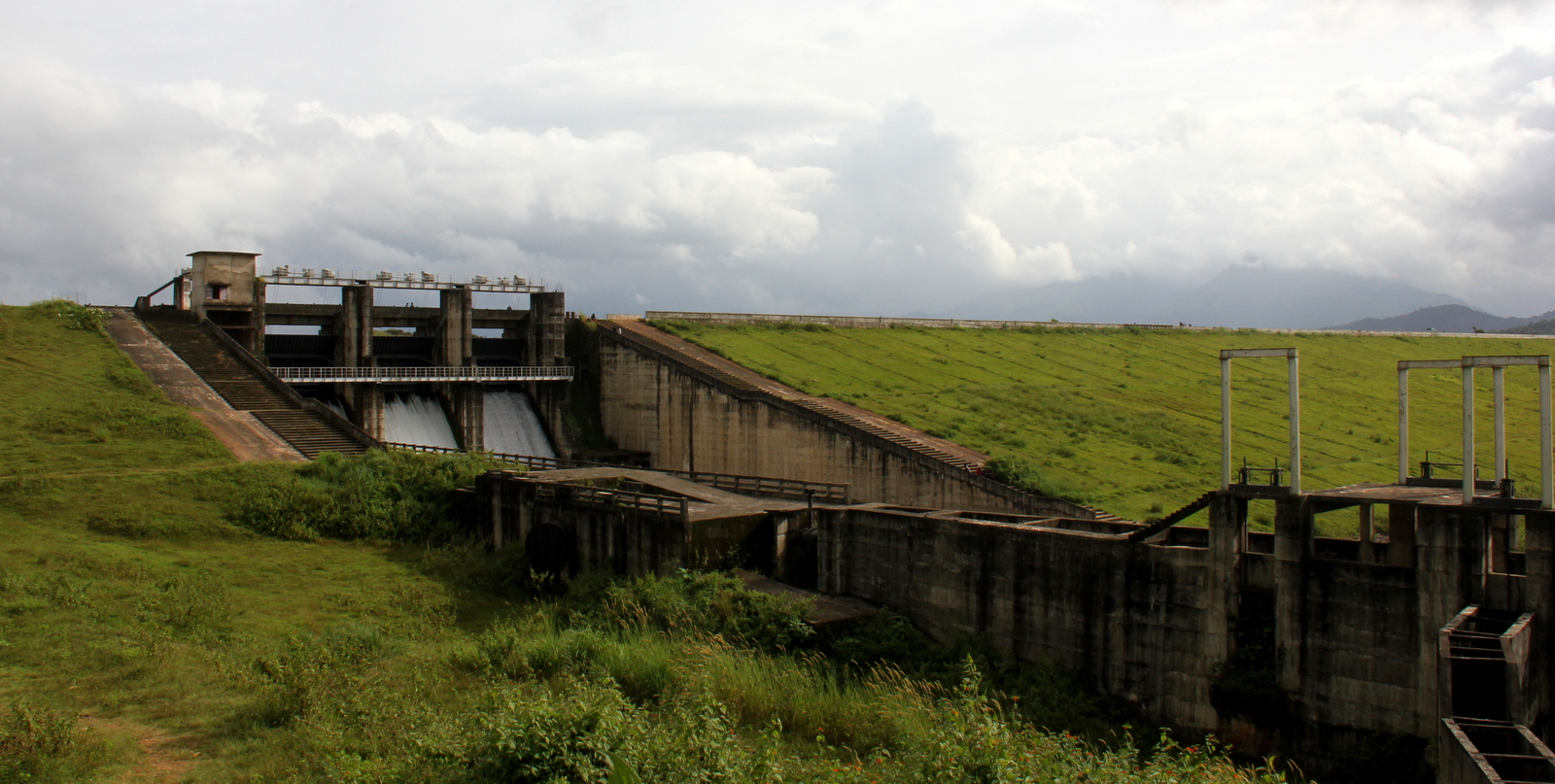
A view of Karapuzha Dam

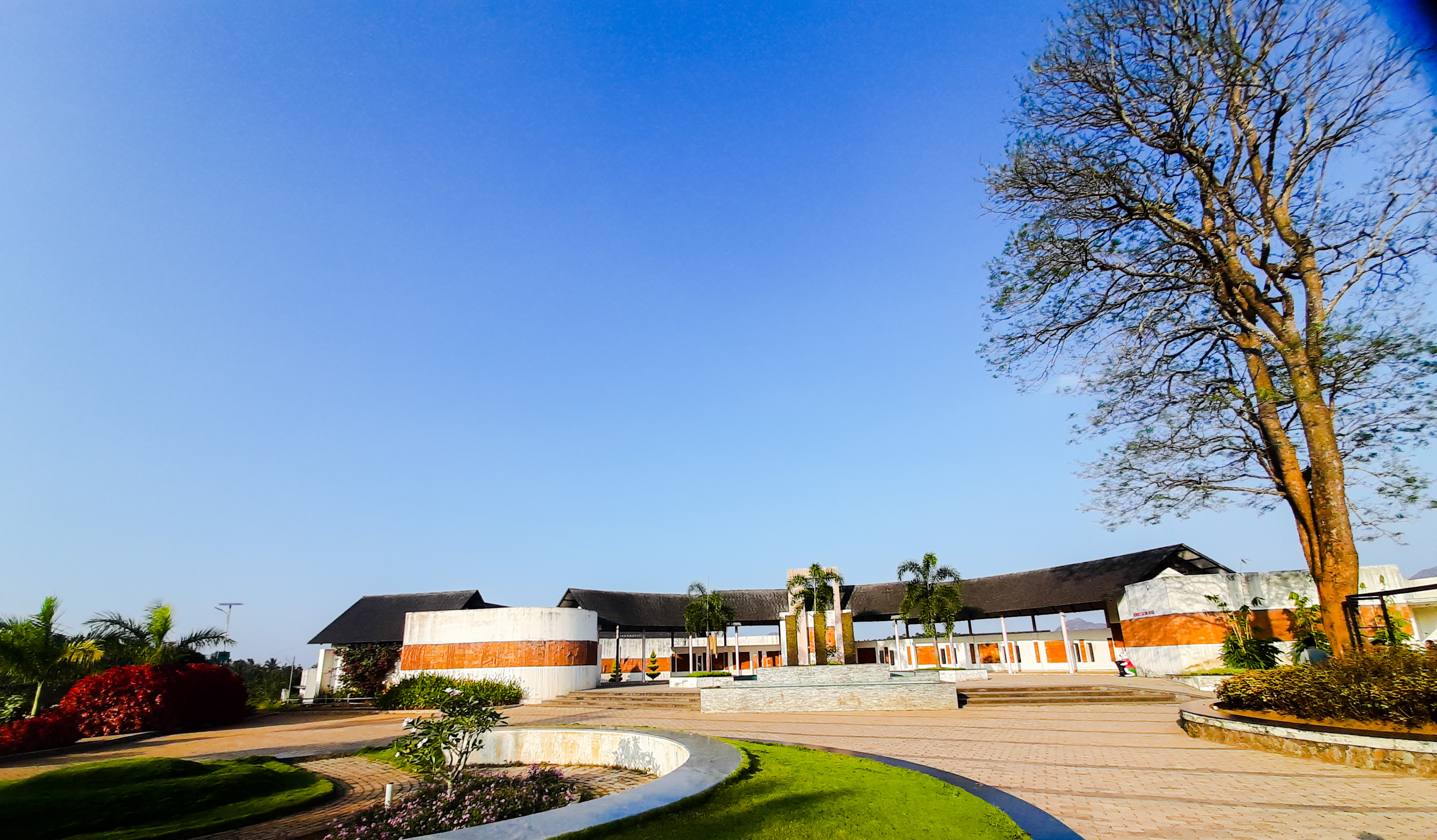
Karapuzha Tourism Project

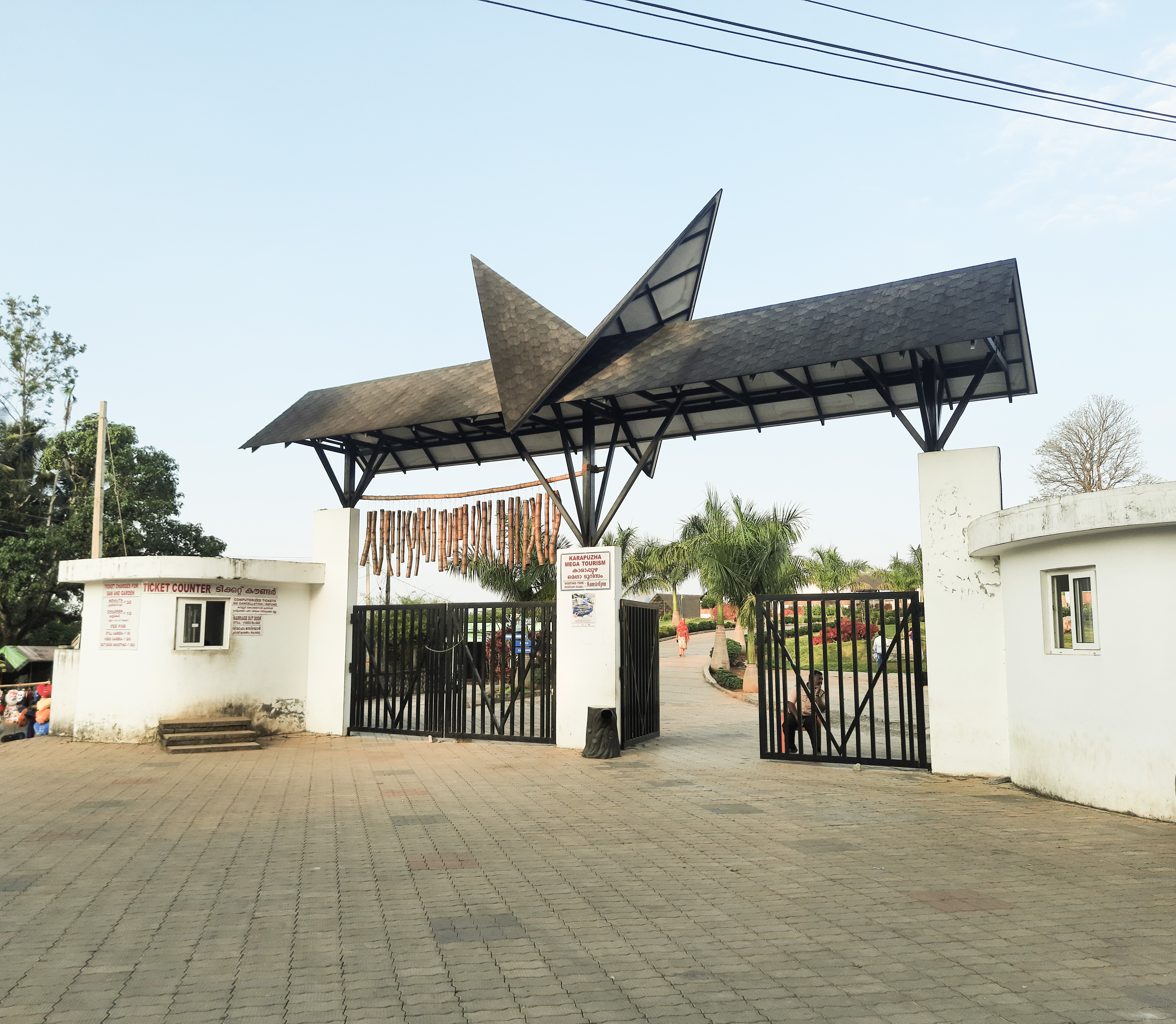
The Entrance View

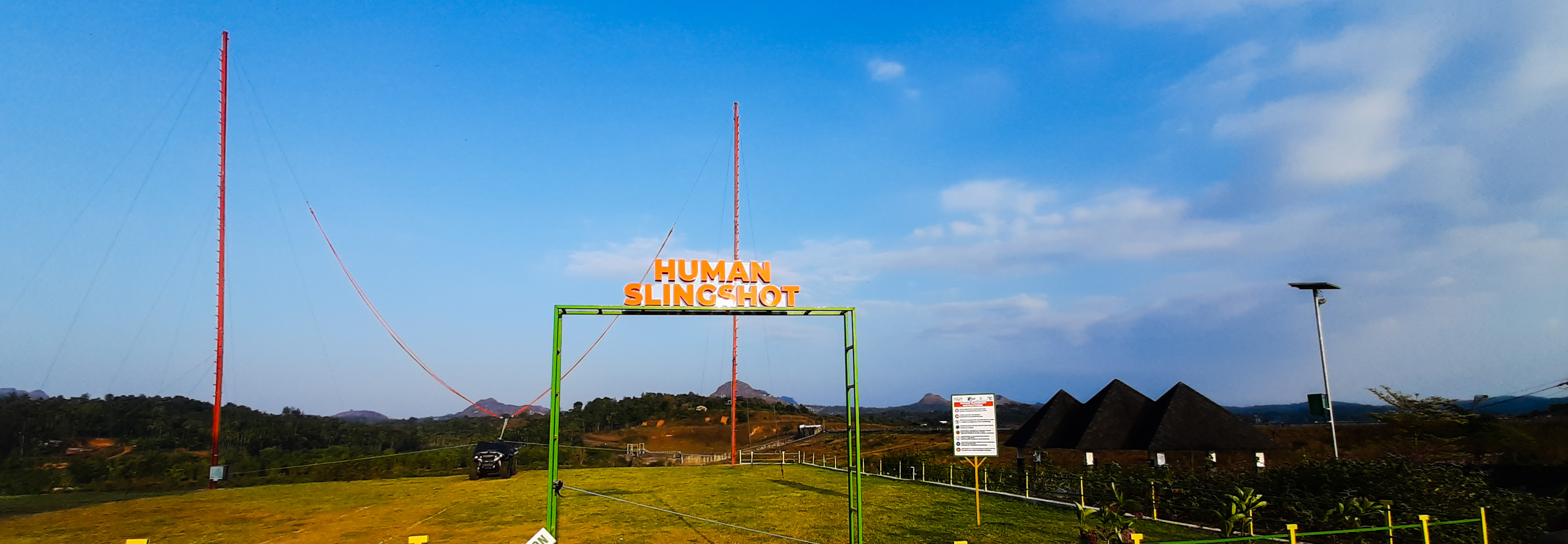
Human Slingshot at Karapuzha Tourism Project, Wayanad

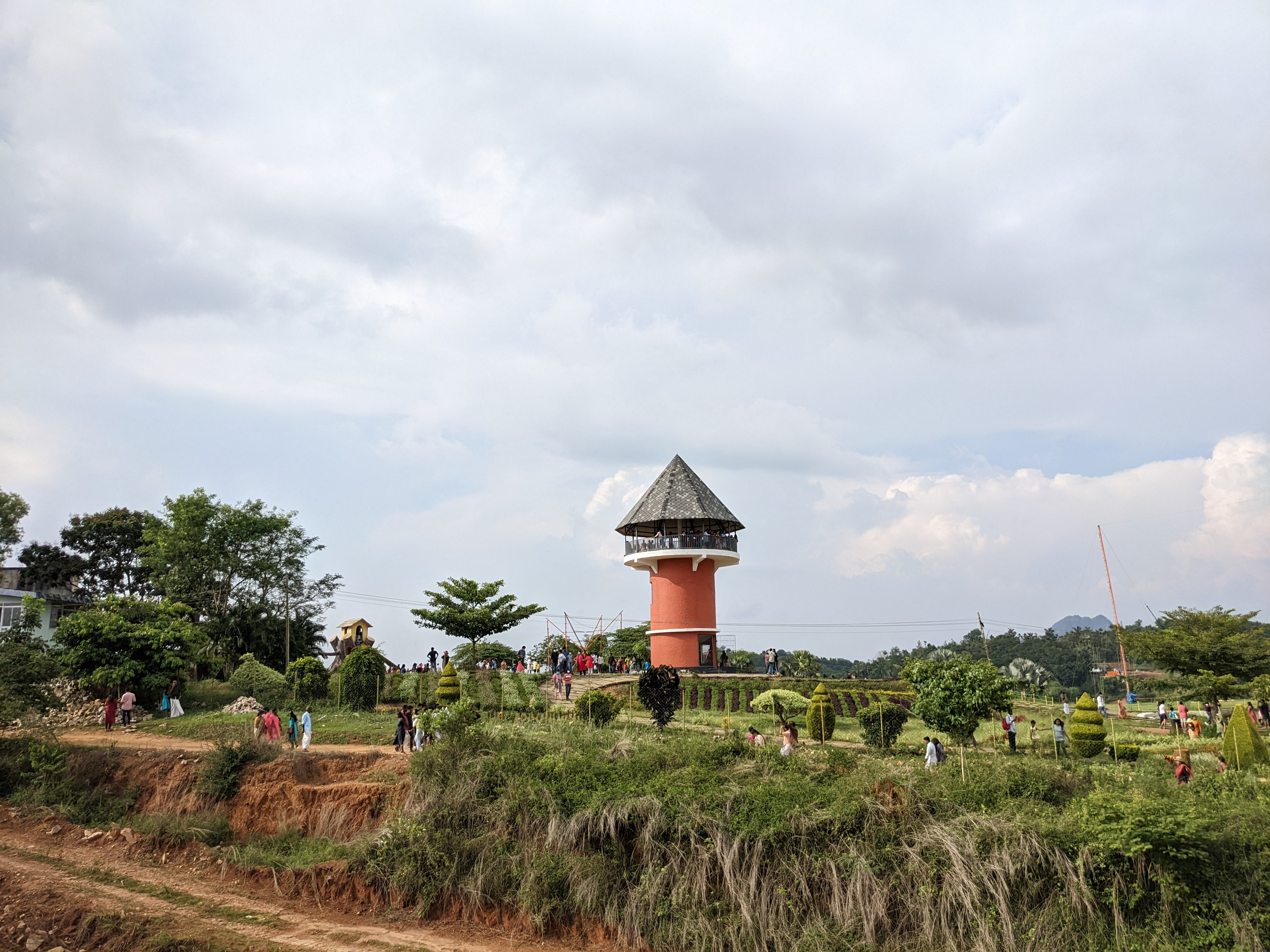
view point at karapuzha
