= Chundale =

- Village
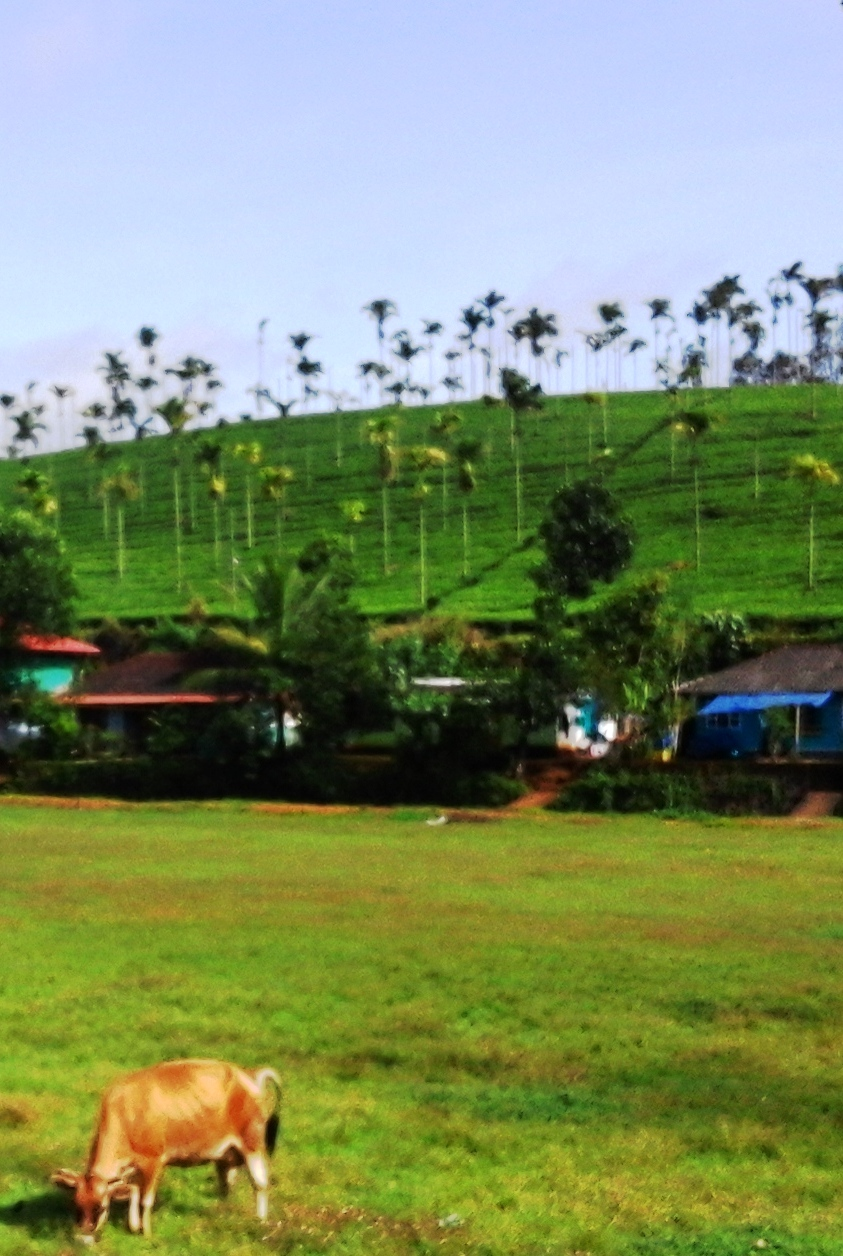
- Kannanchath Maidhan, Chundale
- Interactive map of Chundale
- Coordinates: 11.573860°N 76.057820°E
- Country: India
- State: Kerala
- District: Wayanad

Population (2011)
  - Total: 7,996

Languages
  - Official: Malayalam, English
- Time zone: UTC+5:30 (IST)
- PIN: 673123
- Telephone code: 914936
- Vehicle registration: KL- 12
- Nearest city: Kalpetta

Chundale is a village in Wayanad district in the state of Kerala, India. Chundale is located near Kalpetta, the district headquarters of Wayanad.

== Tourist attractions ==
1. Vaduvanchal, kalpetta.
2. Puliyarmala Jain Temple, Kalpetta.
3. Wayanad Heritage Museum, Kalpetta.
4. Glass Temple, Kalpetta.

== Demographics ==
As of 2011 India census, Chundale had a population of 7996 with 3786 males and 4210 females.

== Transportation ==
Chundale is 69 km by road from Kozhikode railway station and this road includes nine hairpin bends. The nearest major airport is at Calicut. The road to the east connects to Mysore and Bangalore. Night journey is allowed on this sector as it goes through Bandipur national forest. The nearest railway station is Mysore. There are airports at Bangalore and Calicut.

== Image gallery ==
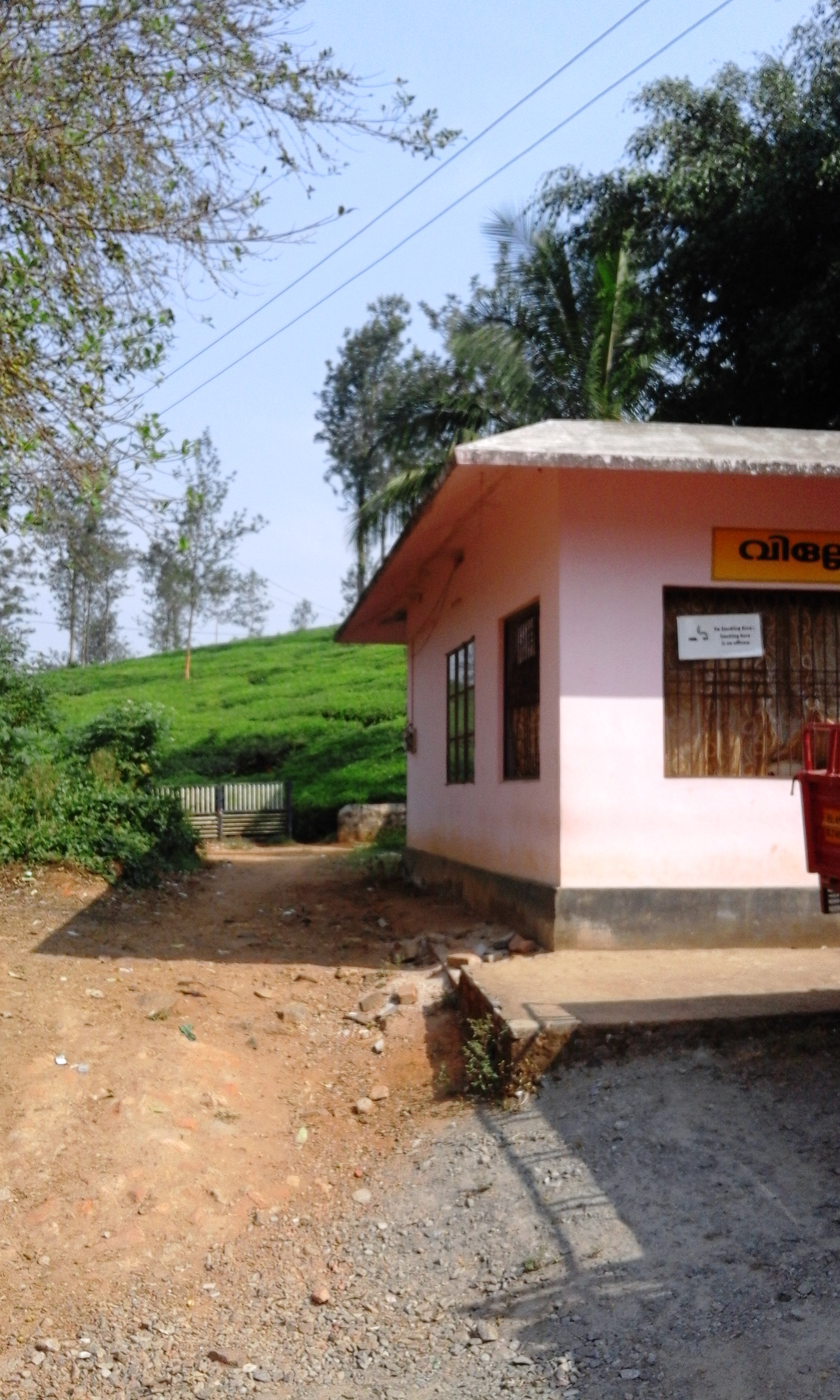
Village Office

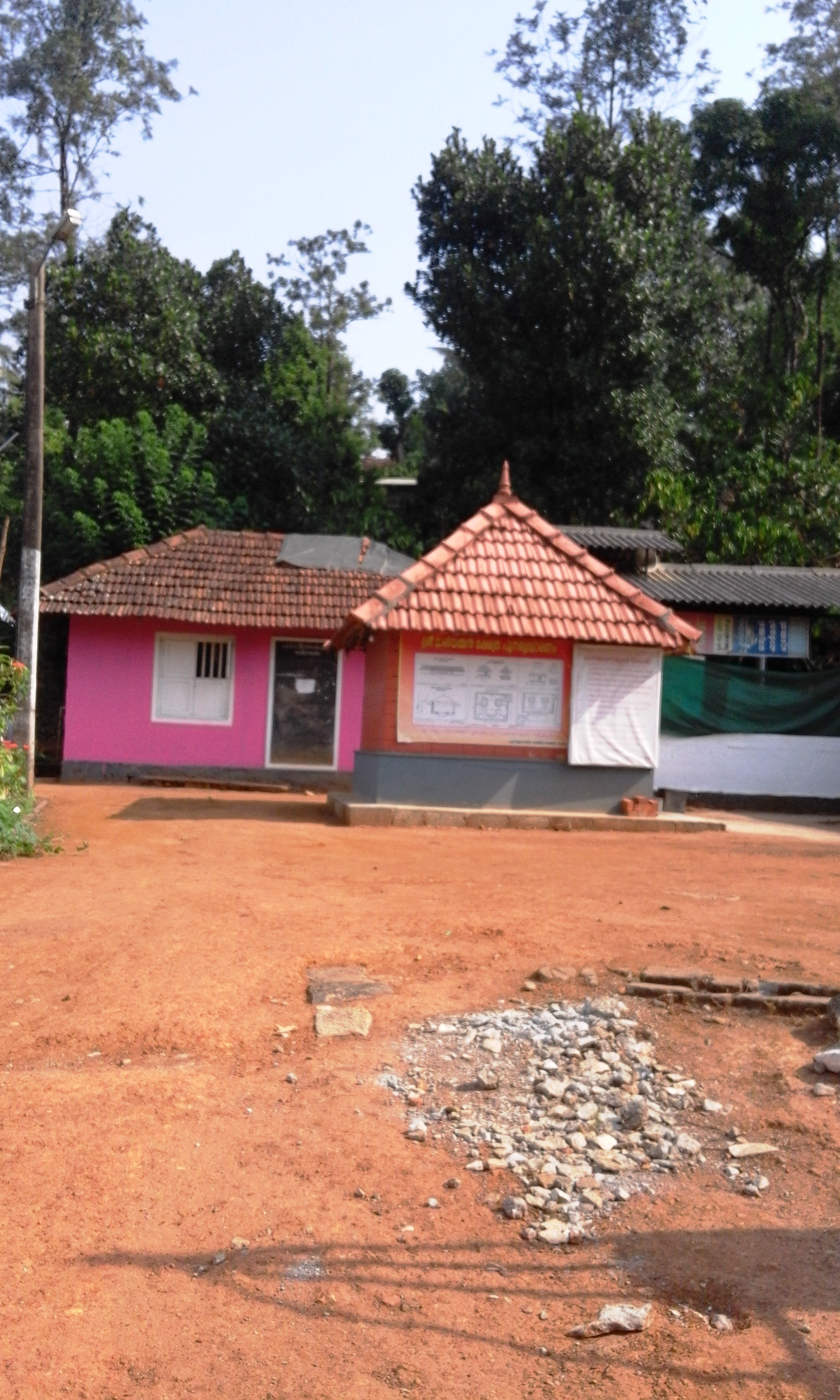
Devi Temple

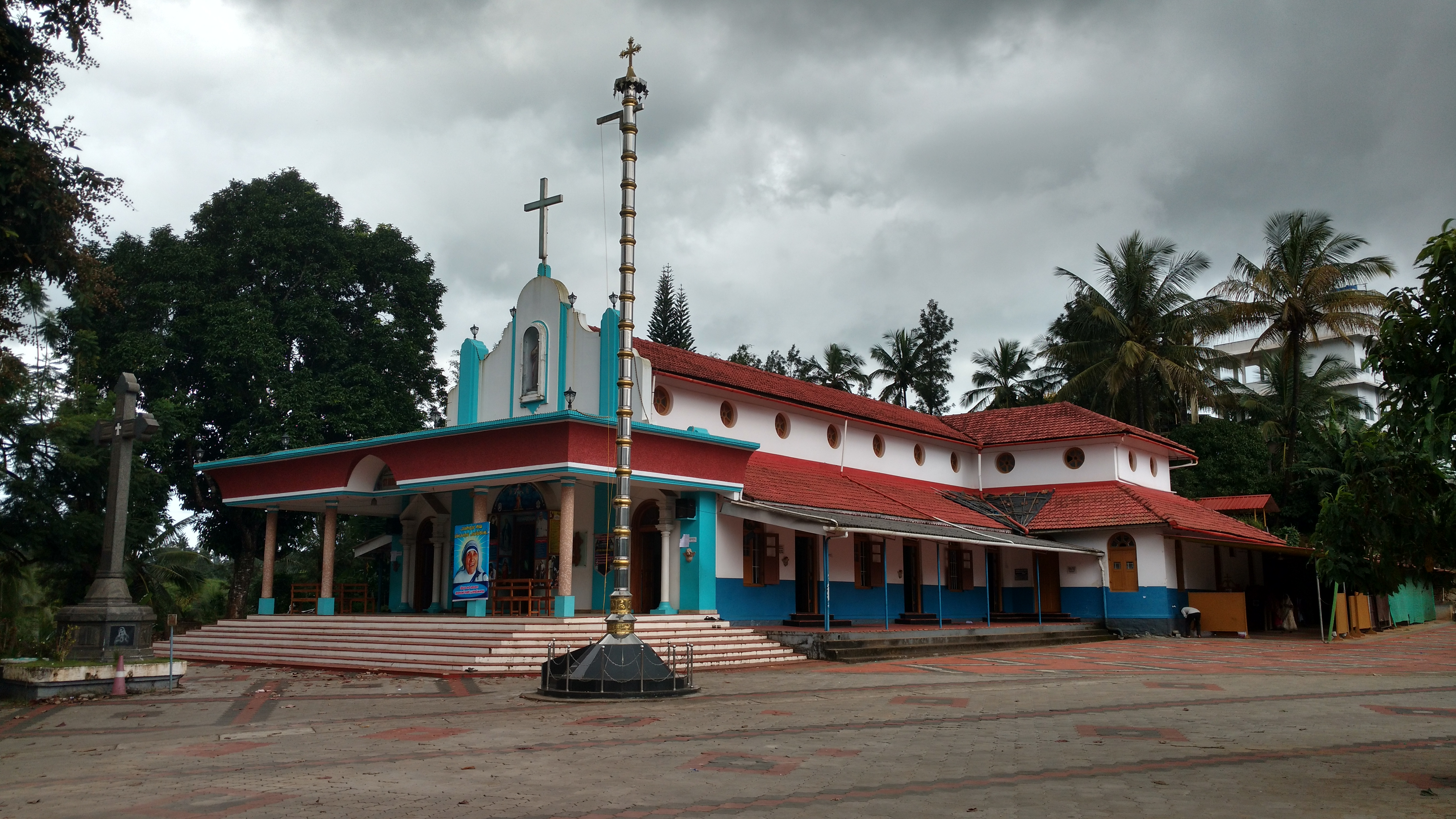
St. Jude's Church Chundale, Wayanad

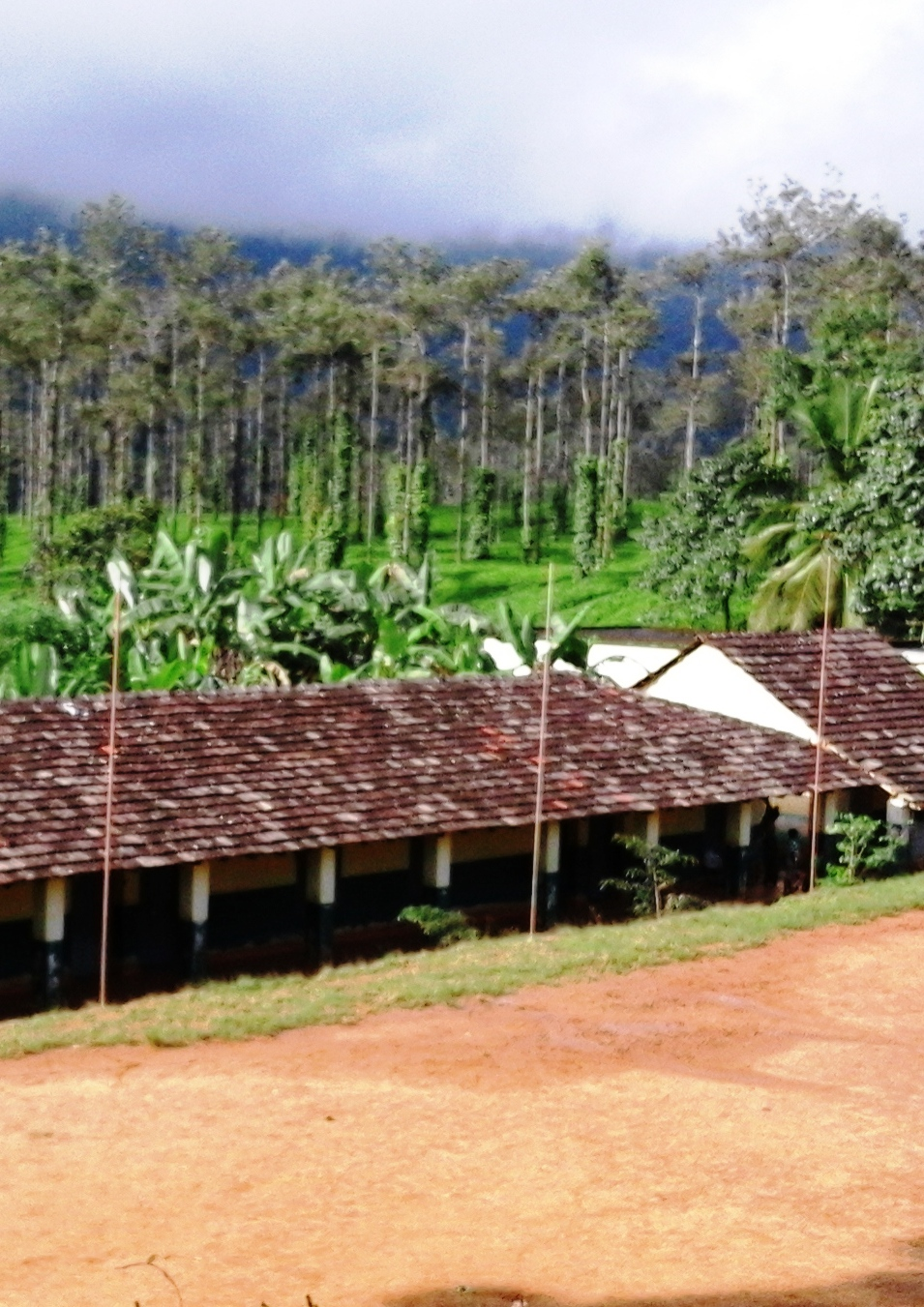
School at Kottanad, Chundale

== See also ==
- Kalpetta town
- Mango Orange village
- Vaduvanchal town
- Meppadi town
