= Meenmutty Falls (Wayanad) =

Waterfall in Padinjarathara, Kerala

Coordinates: 11.728°N 75.886°E

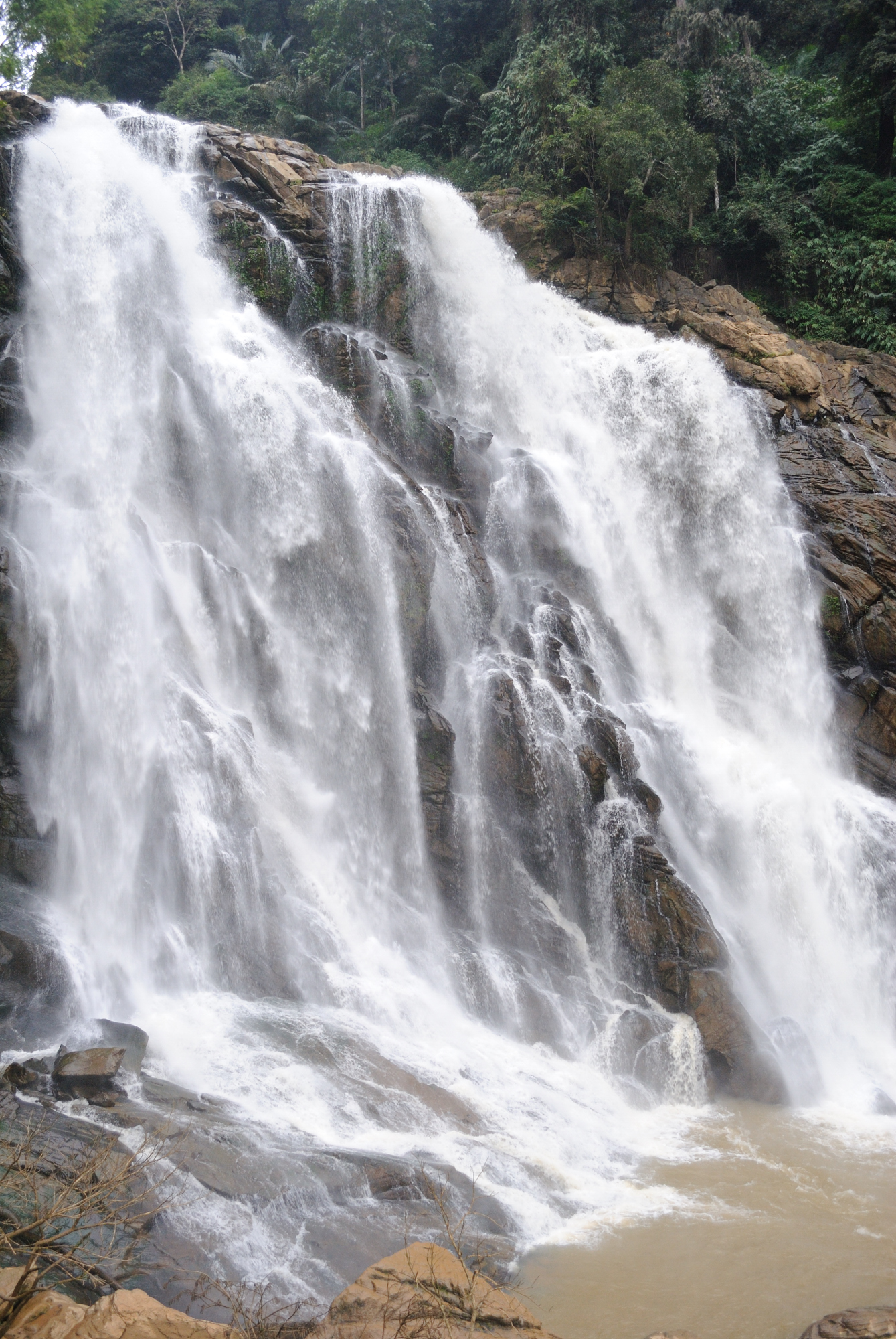
- Meenmutty Falls Wayanad
- Interactive map of Meenmutty Falls
- Longest drop: 1,000 ft (300 m)

Meenmutty WaterFall is situated in Padinjarathara in Wayanad District, Kerala. It is the largest waterfall in Wayanad. It is a three-tiered waterfall with a height of 1000 feet and it is on Banasura hills. It can be accessed from Padinjarathara. Meenmutty waterfalls are dangerous during rainy seasons due to high inflow and many people have drowned since 1991. Meenmutty falls is surrounded by Lush green tea plantations making the hike to the falls a memorable experience to the tourists.

== See also ==
- List of waterfalls
- List of waterfalls in India
- List of waterfalls in India by height
