= Kalpetta Assembly constituency =

Constituency of the Kerala legislative assembly in India

Kalpetta
- Constituency No. 19 for the Kerala Legislative Assembly
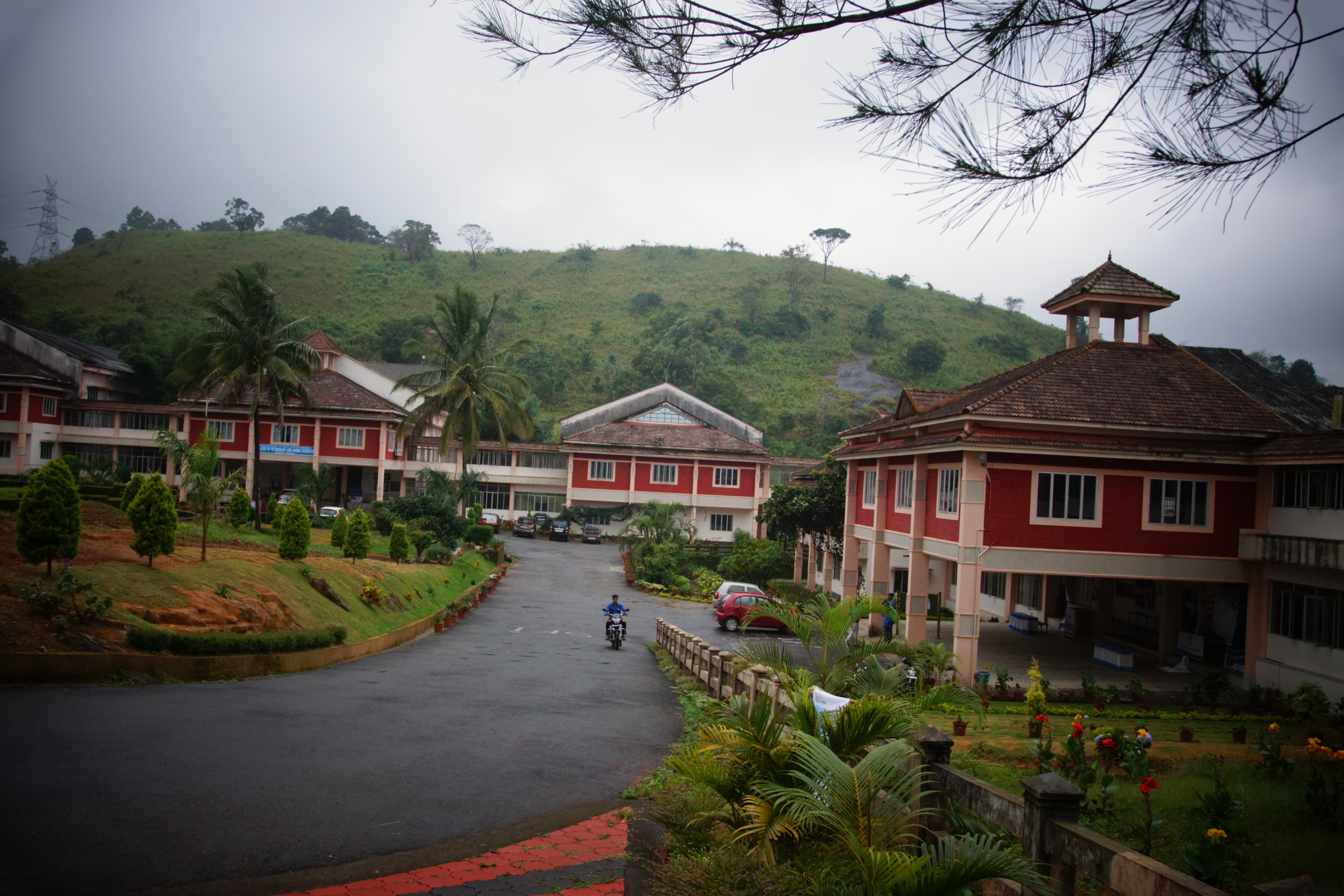
- Kerala Veterinary and Animal Sciences University

Constituency details
- Country: India
- Region: South India
- State: Kerala
- District: Wayanad
- Established: 1965
- Total electors: 2,00,895 (2021)
- Reservation: None

Member of Legislative Assembly
- 16th Kerala Legislative Assembly
- Incumbent T. Siddique
- Party: INC
- Alliance: UDF
- Elected year: 2026

Kalpetta State assembly constituency is one of the 140 state legislative assembly constituencies in Kerala in southern India.It serves as the Headquarters of Wayanad district and Wayanad Lok Sabha constituency. As of the 2026 Kerala Legislative Assembly election, the current MLA is T. Siddique of Indian National Congress.

== Local self-governed segments ==
Kalpetta Assembly constituency is composed of the following local self-governed segments:

Sl no.	Name	Status (Grama panchayat/Municipality)	Taluk
1	Kalpetta	Municipality	Vythiri
2	Kaniyambetta	Grama panchayat	Vythiri
3	Kottathara	Grama panchayat	Vythiri
4	Meppadi	Grama panchayat	Vythiri
5	Muppanad	Grama panchayat	Vythiri
6	Muttil	Grama panchayat	Vythiri
7	Padinharethara	Grama panchayat	Vythiri
8	Pozhuthana	Grama panchayat	Vythiri
9	Thariode	Grama panchayat	Vythiri
10	Vengappally	Grama panchayat	Vythiri
11	Vythiri	Grama panchayat	Vythiri

Kalpetta Assembly Constituency

== Members of Legislative Assembly ==
Election	Niyama Sabha	Name	Party	Tenure	Coalition
1965	2nd	B. Wellington	Independent	1965 – 1967	Left Front
1967	3rd	B. Wellington	Independent	1967 – 1970	Left Front
1970	4th	P. Cyriac John	Indian National Congress	1970 – 1977	United Front
1977	5th	K. G. Adiyodi	Indian National Congress	1977 – 1980	United Front
1980	6th	M. Kamalam	Janata Party	1980 – 1982	UDF
1982	7th	M. Kamalam	Janata Party	1982 – 1987	UDF
1987	8th	M. P. Veerendra Kumar	Janata Party	1987 – 1991	LDF
1991	9th	K K Ramachandran Master	Indian National Congress	1991 – 1996	UDF
1996	10th	K K Ramachandran Master	Indian National Congress	1996 – 2001	UDF
2001	11th	K K Ramachandran Master	Indian National Congress	2001 – 2006	UDF
2006	12th	M. V. Shreyams Kumar	Socialist Janata Party	2006 – 2011	LDF
2011	13th	M. V. Shreyams Kumar	Socialist Janata Party	2011 – 2016	UDF
2016	14th	C. K. Saseendran	Communist Party of India	2016 - 2021	LDF
2021	15th	T. Siddique	Indian National Congress	2021-2026	UDF
2026	16th	T. Siddique	Indian National Congress	2026-	UDF

== Election results ==
=== 2026 ===
2026 Kerala Legislative Assembly election: Kalpetta
Party	Candidate	Votes	%	±%
INC	T. Siddique	97,379	56.15	▲9.99
RJD	P. K. Anilkumar	52,348	30.18	▼12.38
BJP	Prashanth Malavayal	19,175	11.06	▲1.79
NOTA	None of the above	1,137	0.66	▲0.12
AAP	Rafeek C. A.	867	0.50	
SDPI	N. Hamza	801	0.46	
Independent	Radhakrishnan M.	446	0.26	
Independent	Sidheeque	360	0.21	
Independent	Anilkumar	347	0.20	
CPI(ML) Red Star	K. V. Prakash	325	0.19	
Independent	T. K. Ummer	256	0.15	
Margin of victory		45,031	25.97	▲22.37
Turnout		1,73,441		
INC hold		Swing	▲9.99	

=== 2021 ===
2021 Kerala Legislative Assembly election: Kalpetta
Party	Candidate	Votes	%	±%
INC	T. Siddique	70,252	46.16	
LJD	M. V. Shreyams Kumar	64,782	42.56	
BJP	Subeesh T. M.	14,113	9.27	
NOTA	None of the Above	828	0.54	
Margin of victory		5,470	3.60	
Turnout		1,52,209	75.65	
Registered electors		2,01,192		
INC gain from CPI(M)		Swing		

=== 2016 ===
There were 1,90,938 registered voters in the constituency for the 2016 election.

2016 Kerala Legislative Assembly election: Kalpetta
Party	Candidate	Votes	%	±%
CPI(M)	C. K. Saseendran	72,959	48.35	▲9.76
JD(U)	M. V. Shreyams Kumar	59,876	39.68	−
BJP	K. Sadanandan	12,938	8.57	▲3.37
NOTA	None of the above	1,172	0.78	−
WPOI	Joseph Ambalavayal	900	0.60	−
SDPI	K. A. Ayoob	837	0.55	▼0.71
Independent	Madayi Latheef	594	0.39	−
Independent	Shreyams Kumar Anjana House	498	0.33	−
CPI(M-L)	Sujayakumar	468	0.31	−
Independent	Moideen Chembothara	451	0.30	−
Independent	Sandhya N. M.	214	0.14	−
Margin of victory		13,083	8.67	
Turnout		1,50,907	79.03	▲4.68
CPI(M) gain from SJ(D)		Swing		

=== 2011 ===
There were 1,70,245 registered voters in the constituency for the 2011 election.

2011 Kerala Legislative Assembly election: Kalpetta
Party	Candidate	Votes	%	±%
SJ(D)	M. V. Shreyams Kumar	67,018	52.94	
CPI(M)	P. A. Muhammed	48,849	38.59	
BJP	Anand Kumar P. G.	6,580	5.20	
SDPI	Jameela	1,597	1.26	
Independent	K. Nasrudeen	1,197	0.95	
Independent	Cleatus	760	0.60	
BSP	Mujeeb Rahman Anjukunnu	583	0.46	
Margin of victory		18,169	14.35	
Turnout		1,26,584	74.35	
SJ(D) gain from JD(S)		Swing		

== See also ==
- Kalpetta
- Wayanad district
- List of constituencies of the Kerala Legislative Assembly
- 2016 Kerala Legislative Assembly election
