= T. Siddique =

Indian politician (born 1974)

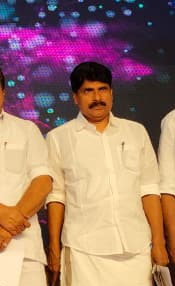

Minister of Agriculture Government of Kerala
- Incumbent
- Assumed office 18 may 2026
- Governor: Rajendra Arlekar
- Chief Minister: V.D. Satheesan
- Preceded by: P. Prasad

Member of Kerala Legislative Assembly
- Incumbent
- Assumed office 25 May 2021
- Preceded by: C. K. Saseendran
- Constituency: Kalpetta

Personal details
- Born: 1 June 1974 (age 52) Perumanna, Kozhikode, India
- Party: Indian National Congress
- Education: Devagiri College, Government Law College, Kozhikode
- Profession: Politician, lawyer, social worker
- Website: https://tsiddique.com

Thuvakkodu Siddique (born 1 June 1974) is an Indian politician who is serving as the Member of the Legislative Assembly for Kalpetta Assembly Constituency as of 2021 and is currently serving as the Minister for Agriculture in the Government of Kerala. He is one of the three Working Presidents of Kerala PCC and a member of the Indian National Congress.

== Political career ==
He was a KSU leader and union chairman at St. Joseph's College Devagiri, Kozhikode. He was the former state president of the Youth Congress Kerala, KPCC General Secretary and KPCC Vice President. In 2014, he contested from Kasaragod Lok Sabha Constituency. He lost to CPIM Candidate P Karunakaran by slight margin in Communist bastion. In 2016, he contested from Kunnamangalam Assembly constituency in Kerala Assembly election. He lost to PTA Rahim in the left wave at Kunnamangalam, the CPIM stronghold. In 2019, he got Wayanad Loksabha seat for contest, he started election campaign after KPCC President Mullappally Ramachandran's Wayanad candidate declaration. AICC president Rahul Gandhi decided to contest from Wayanad along with Amethi Loksabha seat after some days. Then, T Siddique decided to withdraw his candidature from Wayanad Loksabha seat with pleasure. Rahul Gandhi contested from Wayanad and won with record margin. In 2021, Rahul Gandhi decided to give Kalpetta Assembly Constituency seat to T Siddique. He contested from Kalpetta Assembly Constituency from Wayanad District. He defeated the Left Front's LJD candidate M. V. Shreyams Kumar in CPM's sitting seat. T Siddique is current MLA of Kalpetta Assembly Constituency. He contested from Kalpetta Assembly Constituency from Wayanad District in 2026. He defeated the Left Front's LDF candidate P. K. Anilkumar. .

== Personal life ==
T Siddique was born in Pantheerankavu, Kozhikode to Nafeesa and Kasim of the Thuvakkodu house on 1 June 1974. His father was an employee of the Kerala State Electricity Board, but later returned back to his hometown in Kozhikode.

He married Naseema, a teacher from Kollam district, and they divorced in 2015 by mutual consent. He has two sons from this marriage. Aadil and Aashique. He later married Sharafunnisa, a writer from Kannur. He has a son with Sharafunnisa named Zil Yazdan. After winning from Kalpetta Assembly Constituency and becoming an MLA, he moved from Kozhikode to Kalpetta.

== Education ==
He completed high school from Pantheeramkavu High School in the year 1989. Afterwards he joined for Pre- Degree at Zamorin's Guruvayoorappan College. He finished his BCom degree from St. Joseph's College Devagiri in the year 1994. He also did a DCA from Lakhotia Institute of Computer Science and graduated LLB from the Government Law College, Kozhikode in the year of 2000.

== Political positions held ==
- KSU Unit President, St.Joseph's College Devagiri, 1993
- KSU Unit President, Govt. Law College, Kozhikode, 1996-98.
- Elected as Senate Member, University of Calicut, 1997 to 2000
- Youth Congress Perumanna Mandalam Vice President, 1997 to 2000
- UDF Election Committee Convener of Kunnamangalam Assembly Constituency, 2001.
- UDF Election Committee Convener of Kozhikode Parliament Constituency, 2009
- Member Samavaya Committee of Kozhikode DCC. Vice President, Kerala YCC, 2002 to 2006
- President, Kerala YC Committee, 2006–08
- Member of Kerala PCC, 2008–13
- General Secretary of Kerala PCC, 2012–16
- Kozhikode DCC President, 2016-20. KPCC Vice President, 2019–21
- Working President 2021 to 2025.
