= Ali Anwar =

Indian politician

Ali Anwar Ansari

Member of Parliament, Rajya Sabha
- In office 3 April 2006 – 4 December 2017
- Constituency: Bihar

National General Secretary of Loktantrik Janata Dal
- In office 18 May 2018 – 27 December 2024

Deputy Leader of JDU in Rajya Sabha
- In office 7January 2008 – 4 December 2017

Personal details
- Born: 16 January 1954 (age 72) Dumraon, Bihar, India
- Party: Indian National Congress
- Other political affiliations: Loktantrik Janata Dal; Janata Dal (United)
- Spouse: Jamila Bano (m. 1975)
- Children: 4
- Parent(s): Abdul Mannan Ansari; Shahidan Bibi
- Profession: Political and Social Worker, Journalist and Writer

Ali Anwar Ansari (born 16 January 1954) is an Indian journalist, social activist and politician. He is the founder of Pasmanda Muslim Mahaz, concerned with fighting discrimination against lower-caste and Dalit Muslims.

He was a two-time Member of the Parliament of India for Bihar in the Rajya Sabha, representing Janata Dal (United), until his expulsion from the party in September 2017 for opposing the party leadership decision to break from the Mahagathbandan coalition in Bihar and instead partner with the BJP.

== Early life and journalism career ==
Anwar was born in 1954 into a Momin Ansari weaver family in Dumraon, Bihar. His father was a mill worker, involved in trade union activism via the Communist Party of India affiliated All India Trade Union Congress. This influenced Anwar into becoming involved in leftist politics as a high-school student and became a card-carrying member of the CPI.

Anwar became the chief reporter for CPI's Hindi newspaper, Janashakti, seeking to document and publicize the state of the poor under feudalism and the fight against caste and class oppression. Anwar, however became disillusioned with Communism as he felt it was also dominated by upper caste leaders who were themselves prone to casteism. In his view, CPI's focusing solely on class and ignoring caste perpetuates caste-based hierarchy. He stopped being a member of CPI after 20 years.

He continued his journalism work with Navbharat Times, Jansatta and then Swatantra Bharat, still focusing on caste oppression amongst both Hindus and Muslims. He broke stories on how there were separate barracks and kitchens for Police officers of different castes in Patna and how people of upper castes would receive fake Backward Caste certificates to obtain government jobs.

In 1996, Anwar won the KK Birla Foundation fellowship for journalism to study the lives of Dalit and backward caste Muslims in Bihar. This reporting led to a book titled Masavat ki Jang (Fight for Equality)

== Pasmanda activism ==
In 1998, Anwar formed the Pasmanda Muslim Mahaz (PMM) to serve as an umbrella organization fighting to deliver rights to Dalit and backward Muslims. Anwar's argument, as stated in Masavat ki Jang is that Indian Muslims are not a homogenous community and existing organizations only serve upper-caste Muslims. The book details the monopolization by upper-caste 'Ashraf' leaders of civil society organizations such as madrasas and personal law boards, representative institutions (Parliament and State Assemblies) and departments, ministries and institutions that claim to work for Muslims (minority affairs, Waqf boards, Urdu academies, AMU, Jamia Millia Islamia, etc). He also documents the caste-based violence and discrimination against Dalit and backward Pasmanda (Persian for those who have fallen behind) Muslims. Anwar's key demands were -

1. Reservation in government jobs and educational institutions to enable the rise of an educated leadership
2. Inclusion of Dalit Muslims and Christians in the list of Scheduled Castes as was done for Sikh and Neo-Buddhist Dalits in 1950, to allow these groups to fight elections in reserved constituencies
3. Social reform initiatives to encourage inter-caste marriages.

In the 1990s and early 2000s, Muslims in Bihar had electorally consolidated behind Laloo Prasad Yadav's Rashtriya Janata Dal. In the lead up to the 2005 legislative elections, Anwar's PMM and other Pasmanda leaders heavily criticized Laloo's tenure and the lack of progress made by Pasmanda muslims therein. Anwar threw his support behind Nitish Kumar's JD(U)-BJP alliance. and helped Kumar and his alliance to victory. In power, Kumar implemented policies reserving seats in local bodies as well as educational scholarships for backward Muslims. This helped breach Yadav's hold on Muslim voters and drove a portion of the Muslim voter base to Kumar. Anwar's endorsement of Nitish Kumar and drew heavy criticism from Muslim organizations including from within the Pasmanda Muslim Mahaz because of Kumar's alliance with the Hindu-nationalist BJP. Anwar defended his decision by stating Kumar was not a Hindu nationalist.

Organizations similar to PMM in other states like Maharashtra have increasingly focused on social and economic improvement among backward Muslims with initiatives to address landlessness, lack of education, poverty, and unemployment. PMM has continued to focus on political goals such as reservations. This has attracted criticism as reservations only benefit urban educated people, whereas the large majority of Pasmanda Muslims in Bihar and rural, landless and uneducated.

== Political career ==
Anwar was elected to the Rajya Sabha as a member of Janata Dal (United) and served two terms until his expulsion from the party in September 2017. He was suspended from his party for attending a meeting of opposition parties called by Indian National Congress President Sonia Gandhi. As a result, he was expelled from Rajya Sabha. Anwar had strongly opposed the party leadership decision to break from the Mahagathbandan and instead partner with BJP.

Later he became the founding member of Loktantrik Janata Dal along with Sharad Yadav parting ways from Janata Dal (United), due to its alliance with Bharatiya Janata Party in Bihar. In January 2025, Anwar joined the Indian National Congress citing Rahul Gandhi's commitment to constitutional values and social justice.
