= M. V. Shreyams Kumar =

Indian politician

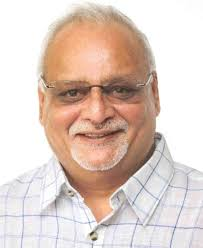

Member of Parliament, Rajya Sabha
- In office 24 August 2020 – 2 April 2022
- Preceded by: M. P. Veerendra Kumar
- Succeeded by: P. Santhosh Kumar
- Constituency: Kerala

Member of the Kerala Legislative Assembly
- In office 11 May 2006 – 19 May 2016
- Preceded by: K. K. Ramachandran
- Succeeded by: C. K. Saseendran
- Constituency: Kalpetta

Personal details
- Born: 15 April 1967 (age 58) Kalpetta, Kerala, India
- Party: Rashtriya Janata Dal
- Other political affiliations: Socialist Janata (Democratic); Janata Dal (United); Janata Dal (Secular); Loktantrik Janata Dal; Janata Dal
- Spouse: Kavitha Shreyams Kumar
- Children: Gags, Rishabh + 2 more
- Parents: M. P. Veerendra Kumar; Usha Veerendra Kumar

Maniyankode Veerendrakumar Shreyams Kumar (born 15 April 1967) is an Indian politician and former member of the 12th and 13th Kerala Legislative Assembly, who served from 2006 to 2016 representing the Kalpetta constituency. He is the son of late M. P. Veerendra Kumar, a notable politician from Kerala.

Presently, he is the Managing Director of Mathrubhumi newspaper and former member of Janata Dal (United) party.

== Career ==
He entered politics as the district secretary of Janata Dal (Secular). Later on, he became the secretary general of Yuva Janata, the youth wing of Janata Dal. In 2000, he became the Director of Marketing and Electronic Media of Mathrubhumi newspaper. He was first elected to the Kerala Legislative Assembly in 2006, from Kalpetta constituency, again in 2011 until 2016. He is now the Managing Director of the Mathrubhumi.

== Personal life ==
Shreyams Kumar was born into a Jain family in Kalpetta, Wayanad. he is the son of M. P. Veerendra Kumar and Usha. He was born in Kalpetta on 15 April 1967. He did his PGDBA from Kings Langley College of Management, London. He is married to Kavitha. They have three daughters and a son.
