= SJD =

SJD may refer to:

- SJD (musician), Sean James Donnelly, a musician from New Zealand
- Doctor of Juridical Science, a doctorate degree in law
- Sir John Deane's College, a sixth form college in Northwich, England
- Socialist Janata (Democratic), a political party in India
- sjd, ISO 639-3 language code for Kildin Sámi
- SJD, IATA airport code for Los Cabos International Airport, in Mexico
