= Neervaram =

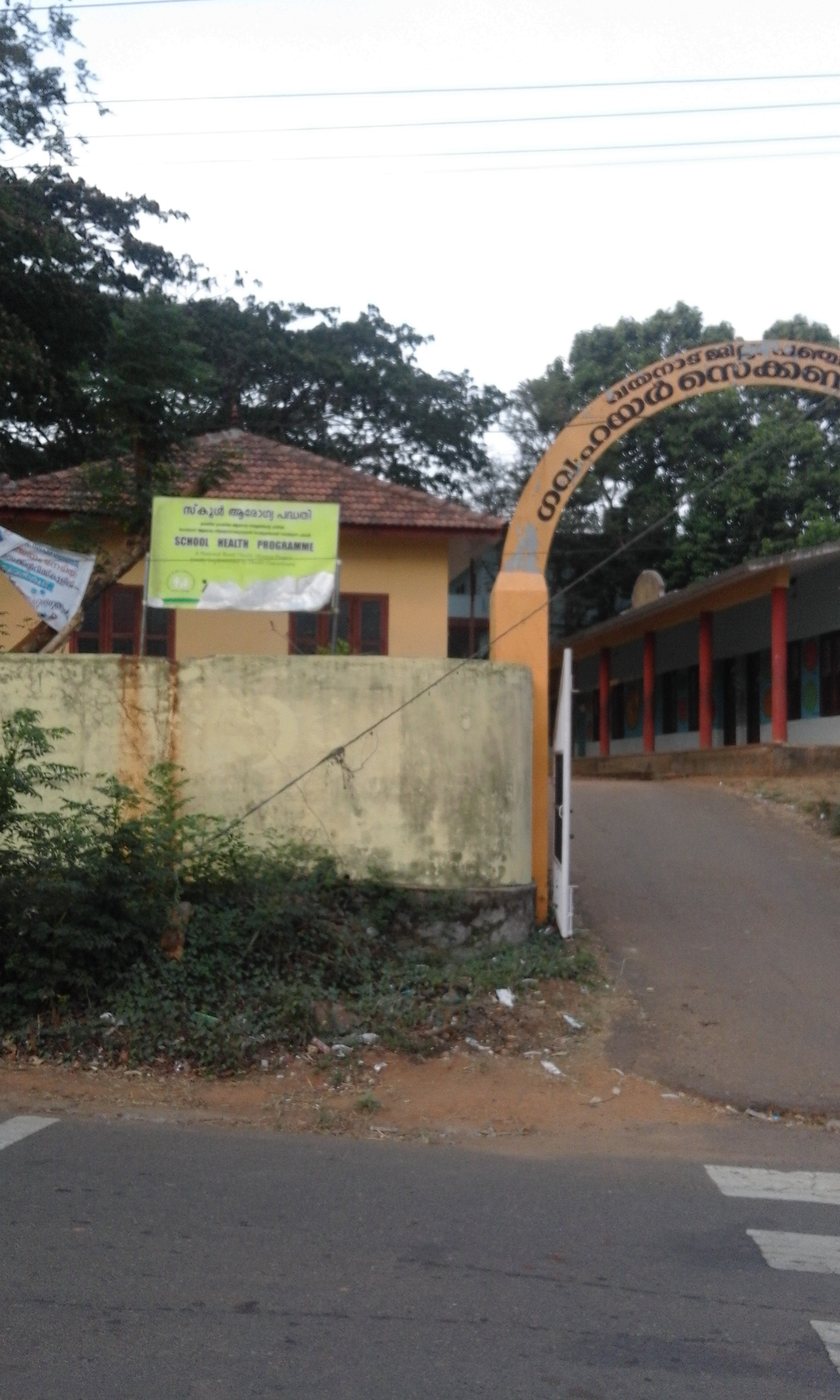
- Neervaram Highschool
- Interactive map of Neervaram
- Coordinates: 11.77612°N 76.07929°E
- Country: India
- State: Kerala
- District: Wayanad
- Time zone: UTC+5:30 (IST)
- PIN: 670721

Neervaram is a village near Panamaram in Wayanad district of Kerala state, India.

== Location ==
Neervaram and Dasanakara are alternate names of the same village. The village is situated 25 km from the district capital of Kalpetta.

== Neervaram High school ==
Neervaram high school has two sections on either side of the main road. One is a high school and the other one is a newly launched higher secondary school. The school was founded in 1956. The school has a good library with 3,871 books.

== Landmarks ==
- Dasanakara attracts tourists because there is a sangamam of three rivers her near the road bridge.
- The most famous place of worship in this village is Kuttippilavu Bhagavathy Temple. Neervaram. This temple is close to forest border and animal attacks are common. Some tribal settlements are also there near the temple.

== Transportation ==
Neervaram can be accessed from Mananthavady or Kalpetta. The Periya ghat road connects Mananthavady to Kannur and Thalassery. The Thamarassery mountain road connects Calicut with Kalpetta. The Kuttiady mountain road connects Vatakara with Kalpetta and Mananthavady. The Palchuram mountain road connects Kannur and Iritty with Mananthavady. The road from Nilambur to Ooty is also connected to Wayanad through the village of Meppadi.

The nearest railway station is at Mysore and the nearest airports are Kozhikode International Airport-120 km, Bengaluru International Airport-290 km, and Kannur International Airport, 58 km.

== Gallery ==
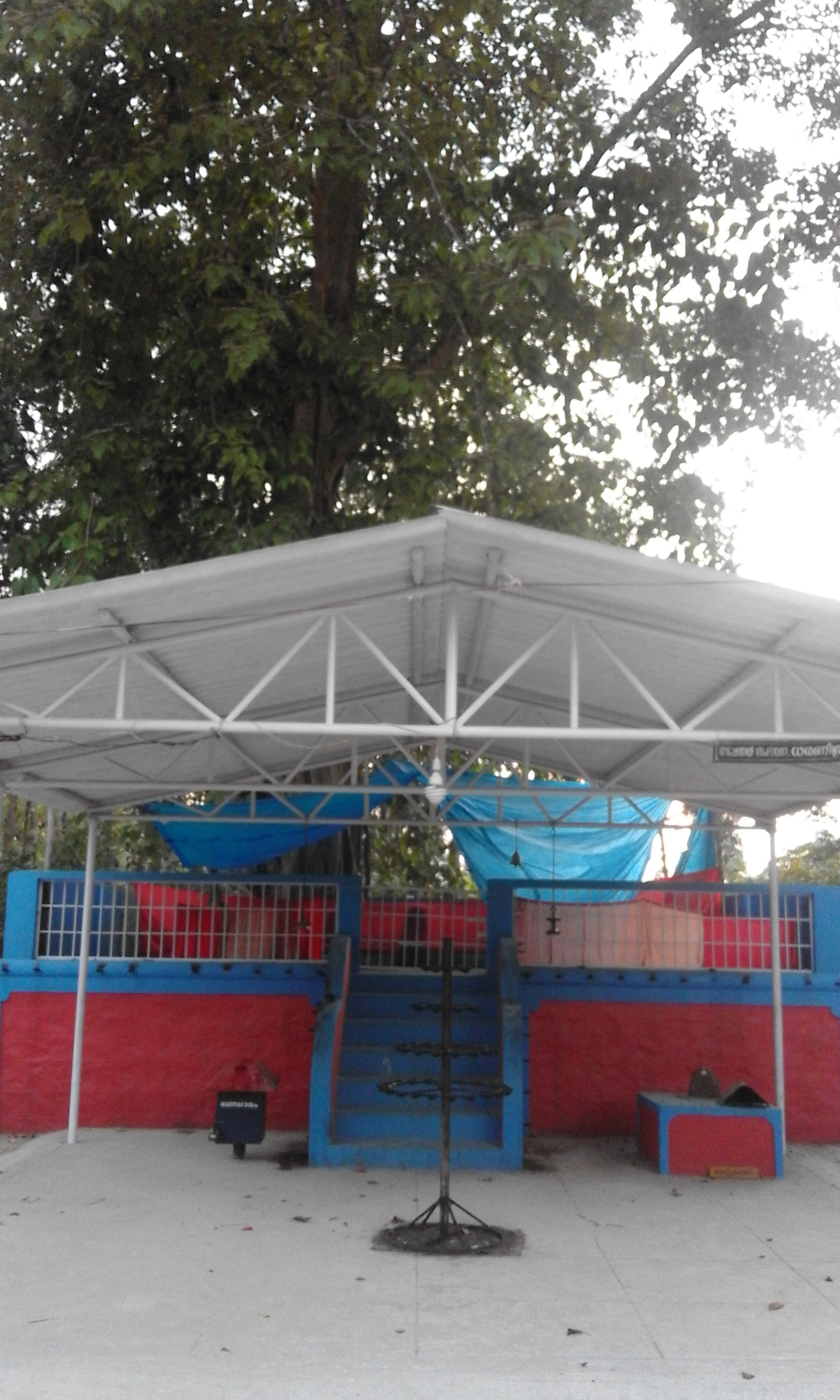
Kuttippilavu Bhagavathy Temple

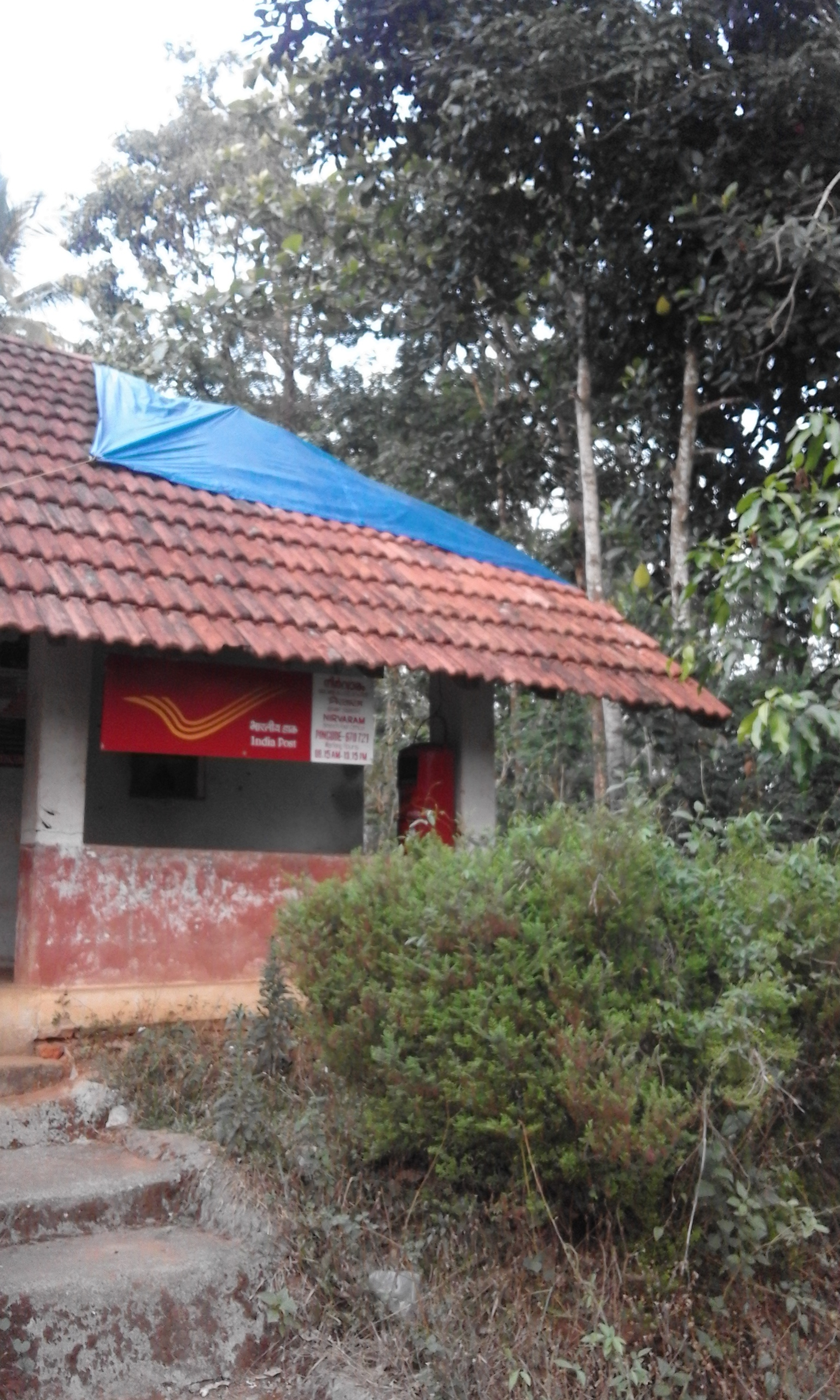
Neervaram Post Office
