= C. K. Saseendran =

Indian politician

C. K. Sasheendran
- സി. കെ. ശശീന്ദ്രൻ
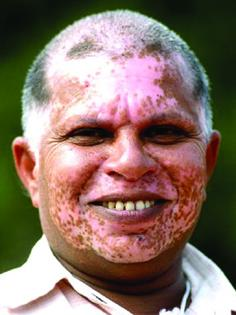

Member of Kerala Legislative Assembly from Kalpetta
- In office 2016–2021
- Preceded by: M. V. Shreyams Kumar
- Succeeded by: T Siddique
- Constituency: Kalpetta

Personal details
- Born: 1958 (age 67–68)
- Party: Communist Party of India (Marxist)
- Spouse: C. Usha
- Children: Gautham, Anagha

C. K. Saseendran is an Indian politician, social worker, dairy farmer, agriculturist and the former MLA of Kalpetta in 14th Kerala Legislative Assembly. He is a member of the Communist Party of India (Marxist).

== Political career ==
Saseendran entered politics through the students' movements of the Communist Party of India (Marxist). He became a full member of the party in 1981 and has worked as area secretary of CPI(M) for Kalpetta and Mananthavady, and is a District Committee (DC) member. In addition, he has served as the district secretary of CPI(M), convenor of Adivasi Bhoo Samrakshana Samiti, and a member of Kerala State Karshaka Thozhilali Union (KSKTU). Saseendran is seen as a champion of the tribals, who make up a considerable proportion of the population of Wayanad (the district he comes from), and has been at the forefront of numerous agitations for the landless tribals.

Kerala Legislative Assembly Election
Constituency	Closest Rival	Majority (Votes)	Won/Lost
Kalpetta	M. V. Shreyams Kumar (JD(U))	13083	Won

== Personal life ==
Saseendran comes from Arinjermala, near Kalpetta. He is married to C. Usha, a part-time bank employee, and they have two children, Gautham Prakash and Anagha.
