= Caste system among South Asian Muslims =

Social system in South Asia

Muslim communities in South Asia have a system of social stratification arising from concepts other than "pure" and "impure", which are integral to the caste system in India. It developed as a result of relations among foreign conquerors, local upper-caste Hindus convert to Islam (ashraf, also known as tabqa-i ashrafiyya) and local lower-caste converts (ajlaf), as well as the continuation of the Indian caste system by converts. Non-ashrafs are backward-caste converts. The concept of "pasmanda" includes ajlaf and arzal Muslims; ajlaf status is defined by descent from converts to Islam and by Birth (profession). These terms are not part of the sociological vocabulary in regions such as Kashmir and Uttar Pradesh, and say little about the functioning of Muslim society.

The Baradari system is social stratification in Pakistan and, to an extent, India. The South Asian Muslim caste system includes hierarchical classifications of khandan (dynasty, family, or lineage).

== History ==
Although Islam does not recognize any castes (only socio-economic classes), existing divisions in Persia and India were adopted by local Muslim societies. Evidence of social stratification exists in later Persian works such as Nizam al-Mulk's 11th-century Siyasatnama, Nasir al-Din al-Tusi's 13th-century Akhlaq-i Nasiri, and the 17th-century Jam-i-Mufidi.

After Muhammad's death in the seventh century CE, tribes and families fought a war of succession. After this, a determinant for social stratification in Arab society included being part of Muhammad's close family (ahl al-bayt). This factor was present in ancient South Asia among Muslims since the eighth century.

This led to a further hierarchical determinant: Arabs versus non-Arabs. Among non-Arabs, further divisions were made between Muslims who were converted in early Islamization campaigns (khadim-al islam) and those who converted more recently (jadid-al islam). South Asian Muslims are divided by classifications that have resulted in Arab-origin higher castes (unch zat) and descendants of lower-caste converts (nich zat). Mughal Empire sultans were high-caste.

The Muslims who came to the subcontinent during the 12th century were already divided into vocation-based social "classes", including priests, nobles, and others, and racial segregation separated local Muslim converts from foreign-origin Muslims. The foreigners claimed superior status, since they were associated with the conquerors and considered themselves as sharif ("noble"). Indian Muslim society also split in accordance with the Hindu caste system. According to M. N. Srinivas (1986) and R. K. Bhattacharya, Indian Hindu converts to Islam brought their caste system to the region's Muslim society. Louis Dumont, however, believed that the Islamic conquerors adopted the Hindu caste system "as a compromise which they had to make in a predominantly Hindu environment."

Ziauddin Barani, a 14th-century Indian political thinker in the Delhi Sultanate, suggested that the "sons of Mohamed" receive a higher social status than the low-born. His most significant contribution to the fatwa was his analysis of castes and Islam. Barani said that castes would be mandated through state laws (zawabi), which would take precedence over sharia in a conflict. According to Barani, every act "contaminated with meanness and based on ignominy, comes elegantly [from the Ajlaf]". He developed an elaborate system of promotion and demotion of imperial officers (wazirs), primarily based on caste. Barani's opinions were not followed by his own sultanate. He accused the Tughlaq Sultans of appointing "low-born" people to high office; they included Sultan Muhammad Shah and Sultan Firuz Shah, Barani's patron in Delhi, who appointed a former slave captured from Telangana and converted as his grand vizier.

Muslims from the julaha (weaver) caste began to identify as "Ansaris", butchers as "Quereshis", and the sanitation and bhishti castes as "Sheikh". The Muslim concept of hereditary kafa'ah, which the ulama use to support endogamy, justifies South Asian Muslim caste practices.

=== Ashrafization ===
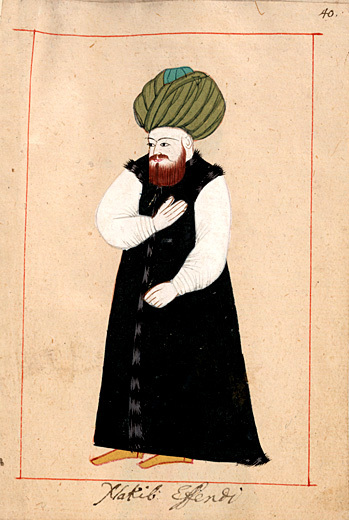
A Sayyid wearing a green turban

Ashrafization (or sharifization) is the process of lower-caste Muslims adopting upper-caste Muslim practices to climb the social ladder. Some would associate with different titles or claim different ancestry to achieve this.

Some families would claim Sayyid status, with varying degrees of success. The Sayyid dynasty (founded by a Punjabi) and Barha Sayyids (founded by Punjabi peasants who moved to Muzaffarnagar) are examples of families who succeeded in being recognized as Sayyids. However, other families had their claims dismissed. The Nawabs of the Rohilla dynasty (founded by a Jat convert) failed to provide any reliable proof for their claims and were thus ignored.

Other families would simply claim a general Arab ancestry. The Awans have historically claimed Arab descent, adopting the title of Malik, thus granting them a "high status in the Indian Muslim environment". The Kalhoros and Daudpotras also attempted to associate with Arabs, adopting the title of Abbasi. The Shaikhs in North India also claim Arab descent.

Some groups, such as the Sambhals of Uttar Pradesh, claim Turkic descent and relation to the Mughal people.

As the Pashtunization of Khyber Pakhtunkhwa took place, local Indo-Aryan tribes would begin to associate with the foreign Pashtuns. Many of the former Dardic speakers of Swat and Indus Kohistan now claim Pashtun ancestry.

==== Caste associations ====
Another type of ashrafization is the establishment of caste associations to promote a community's interests and provide social support. These anjuman ('forum', 'society') is commonly termed jama'at (جماعت ; 'congregation', 'group', 'community'), replacing the use of zat ('birth or origin group'). The Khoja caste, Ismaili Shias primarily in Karachi and Sindh, are an example. Other significant Muslim caste associations are those of the Memons and Bohras in Sindh and Gujarat.

=== Research ===
Definitions of caste vary, and opinions differ on whether the term can be used to denote social stratification in non-Hindu communities. Ghaus Ansari uses the term "caste" to describe Muslim social groups with the following characteristics: endogamy within the group; hierarchical gradation of groups; determination of group membership by birth; and, in some cases, association by occupation with a social group. Western Indologists began to catalogue Muslim castes during the 19th century in:

- Henry Miers Elliot's Supplement to the glossary of Indian terms (1844), later amplified into Memoirs on the history, folk-lore, and distribution of the Races of the North Western Provinces of India
- John Charles Williams's Report on the Census of Oudh (1869)
- Denzil Ibbetson's Census Report of Punjab (1883), later adapted into Panjab Castes
- John Nesfield's Brief View of the Caste System of the North-Western Provinces and Oudh (1885)
- Herbert Hope Risley's Tribes and castes of Bengal (1893)
- William Crooke's Tribes and Castes of the North-western Provinces and Oudh (1896)

In 20th-century British India, several works included Muslim social groups in their descriptions of Indian castes. These included Horace Arthur Rose's A Glossary of the Tribes and Castes of the Punjab and North-West Frontier Province (1911). Around 1915, Mirza Muhammad Hassan Qatil wrote about the four firqa (classes) of the ashraf. He described how people in the following occupations were considered paji (contemptible): elephant caretaking, bread- and perfume-making, and dealing in bazaars. Ghaus Ansari began an academic discussion in 1960 about the concept of a Muslim caste system, and Imtiaz Ahmed elaborated on the subject in Caste and Social Stratification among the Muslims (1973).

== Divisions ==
Ghaus Ansari (1960) identified the following four categories of Muslim social divisions in India:

- Ashrafs, who claim foreign-origin descent
- Forward-caste converts
- Converts from other Indian tribes
- Converts from untouchable castes

Ashraf hierarchy is determined by the degree of nearness to Muhammad and country of origin; Syeds (who trace descent from Fatima, Muhammad's daughter) have the highest status. Non-Ashrafs are categorized as ajlaf, with untouchable Hindu converts also categorized as arzal ("degraded"). They are relegated to menial professions, such as scavenging and carrying night soil.

In Pakistan, social groups known as quoms have a social stratification comparable to the Indian caste system. The quoms differ widely in power, privilege, and wealth. Ethnic affiliation (such as Pathan, Sindhi, Baloch, and Punjabi, etc.) and membership in a biraderi are components of social identity. Within the bounds of endogamy, close consanguineous unions are preferred due to a unity of group- and individual factors. McKim Marriott said that a social stratification that is hierarchical, closed, endogamous, and hereditary is prevalent, particularly in western Pakistan. Numerically- and socially-influential tribes in Pakistani Punjab include the agricultural tribes of Arain, Awan, Rajput, Jat Muslim, and Gujjar.

In Nepal, the castes of Muslims rank differ according to the criteria applied. In India, most ulemas (theologians or doctors of the law) are part of the Syed; many Ashrafs are businessmen, landowners, and traders. A regional "marriage circle" can be formed, where marriage alliances occur. A Syed's status is sometimes based more on male descendants and hypergamous marriage than ancestry. Early Turks had subdivisions.

In the Rasum-i Hind, a textbook compiled by Master Pyare Lal in 1862, four firqa (ashraf subdivisions) are explained and nasl (lineage) is described. Ancestors of the Mughal caste are said to be descended from the Biblical Noah, and ancestors of the Pathans are said to be Israelites from the time of Solomon. In the Mughal Empire ruling class, Muslims were classified as native Hindustani (Indians), Afghan (Pashtuns), Turani (Turco-Mongols), and Irani (Persians).

=== Pakistani Punjab ===
==== Zamindars, Kammis, and the Seyp system ====
Zamindars (a landowning class) and Kammis, service-providing castes, are hierarchical groups in Pakistani Punjabi villages which are based on parental occupation. In the Seyp system (contract labour), the Kammis provide work and services and receive favours, food, money, crops, and grains. Zamindars are considered a dominant caste and tend to be village and town leaders. Urban social, political, and economic affairs are dominated by Zamindars, and land is controlled by them; Kammis are socially marginalized. Kammis and Zamindars intermarry. Ancestral land ownership and agriculture are ascribed to Zamindars. Other castes are higher than the Kammis and below the Zamindars.

Caste endogamy exists in Pakistan, with members of a quom tending to marry within it. In rural areas of Pakistani Punjab, endogamy is vital to the caste system. Kammis include artisans, labourers, and service providers such as barbers, cobblers, and carpenters. Most are labourers or perform low-ranking tasks. According to a Kammi woman,

Even if a Kammi acquires 100 acres of land, he remains Kammi, and Zamindars will always consider him lower. A Zamindar who owns one acre of land would think, "If a Kammi has bought 2 acres, so what? After all, he remains a Kammi". They do not accept us as equals.

Quoms influence marriage practices. Different Zamindar quoms sometimes intermarry, however, and may constitute a Biradari. A study in a Pakistani Punjabi village found that in a seyp (contract) between Zamindar and Kammi families, Kammi families give goods to and perform services for the Zamindars, who provide the Kammis with grain. Kammi families also perform customary and ritual tasks, for example, a barber cooks in the Zamindar's house for special events and performs circumcisions.

Quom loyalty is also evident in elections. Biradaris are the sole criteria in local Pakistani Punjab elections; Zamindars outnumber Kammis there, and Kammis do not generally stand for election due to financial considerations.

=== Bengal ===
Although class distinctions based on wealth and occupation exist, hereditary castes do not exist for most Bengali Muslims (unlike Bengali Hindus). The majority of Bengali Muslims converted from indigenous tribes of Bengal who had very weak ties to Hinduism and the caste system. Any remaining caste-like group consciousness was largely eliminated by the Faraizi movement and similar Islamic reform movements. Nearly all Bengali Muslims recorded their caste as Sheikh when asked in colonial censuses. About 35 Muslim castes reportedly exist in Bihari Muslims in West Bengal.

=== Sindh ===
Sindh, like Punjab, has a tradition of various tribes who have caste-like status such as Samnas, Baloch and Jats. Although not as strong as in Punjab, the biradari system plays a role in who is a wadera (landlord) and hari (peasant).

=== Sharifism ===
Sharifism is the status given to claimants of prophetic nasab (or qarabah, "closeness"): descent from Muhammad, Muhammad's Quraysh tribe, or Muhammad's family.

== Discrimination ==
=== Representation ===
In 20th-century India, ashraf Muslims dominated government jobs and parliamentary representation. Campaigns exist to include lower Muslim social classes among groups eligible for affirmative action.

=== Burial ===
In India's Bihar state, forward-caste Muslims have opposed the burial of backward-caste Muslims with them.

=== Cooking ===
A study in a Pakistani village found that a caste-like hierarchy exists in its Muslim community. The sweeper group is ranked lowest, and other Muslim communities do not allow sweepers to touch their cooking vessels.

=== Historical racism ===
According to Ziauddin Barani, Turkish sultans discriminated against Muslims of local descent; Iltutmish discriminated against low-birth Muslims by firing 33 of them from the government, and appointed Jamal Marzuq as mutasarrif of Kannauj. Aziz Bahruz disagreed because of Marzuq's low birth status, and Marzuq was removed from his post. Low-born people could not be a mudabbiri or khwajgi, and were not eligible for an iqta recommendation.

Ghiyas ud din Balban kept low-birth people from important offices, and criticized the appointment of Kamal Mohiyar as mutassarrif of Amroaha. A letter by Sayyid Ashraf Jahangiri explains that Balban researched the ancestry of his government servants and officers with genealogists in Delhi.

Tughlaq gave "preference to foreign-born Muslims in administration and government" and "systematically ignored the claims of Indian Muslims". According to Sayyid Ashraf Jahangiri,

The Sultan went to the extent of offering the most responsible and distinguished offices of the kingdom – for instance, those of a Wazir, a Dabir, a military commander, a judge, a professor of theology, or a Shaikhul-Islam – to almost any foreigner of some learning. Foreigners coming to India were collectively known as "the Honourables" (A'izza).

Historians and Urdu writers, including Masood Alam Falahi, have explained how discrimination by ashraf Muslims against lower-caste and Dalit Muslims was often disguised as claims of class and khandaani (family line) values by Uttar Pradesh Muslims.

== See also ==
- Dalit Muslims
- Caste system among South Asian Christians
- Caste system in India
  - Caste-related violence in India
- Islam in South Asia
  - Islam in India
- Pasmanda Muslim Mahaz
- Social class in the United Kingdom
- Social class in the United States

== Notes ==
A. This source gets the quotation from the following source: E A Gait, 'Census of India' 1901: Bengal Report 6 (1), Bengal Secretariat Press. 1902, p 439; the description in 'Imperial Gazetteer of India', v. 2, pp 329
