= M. Kamalam =

Indian politician (1926–2020)

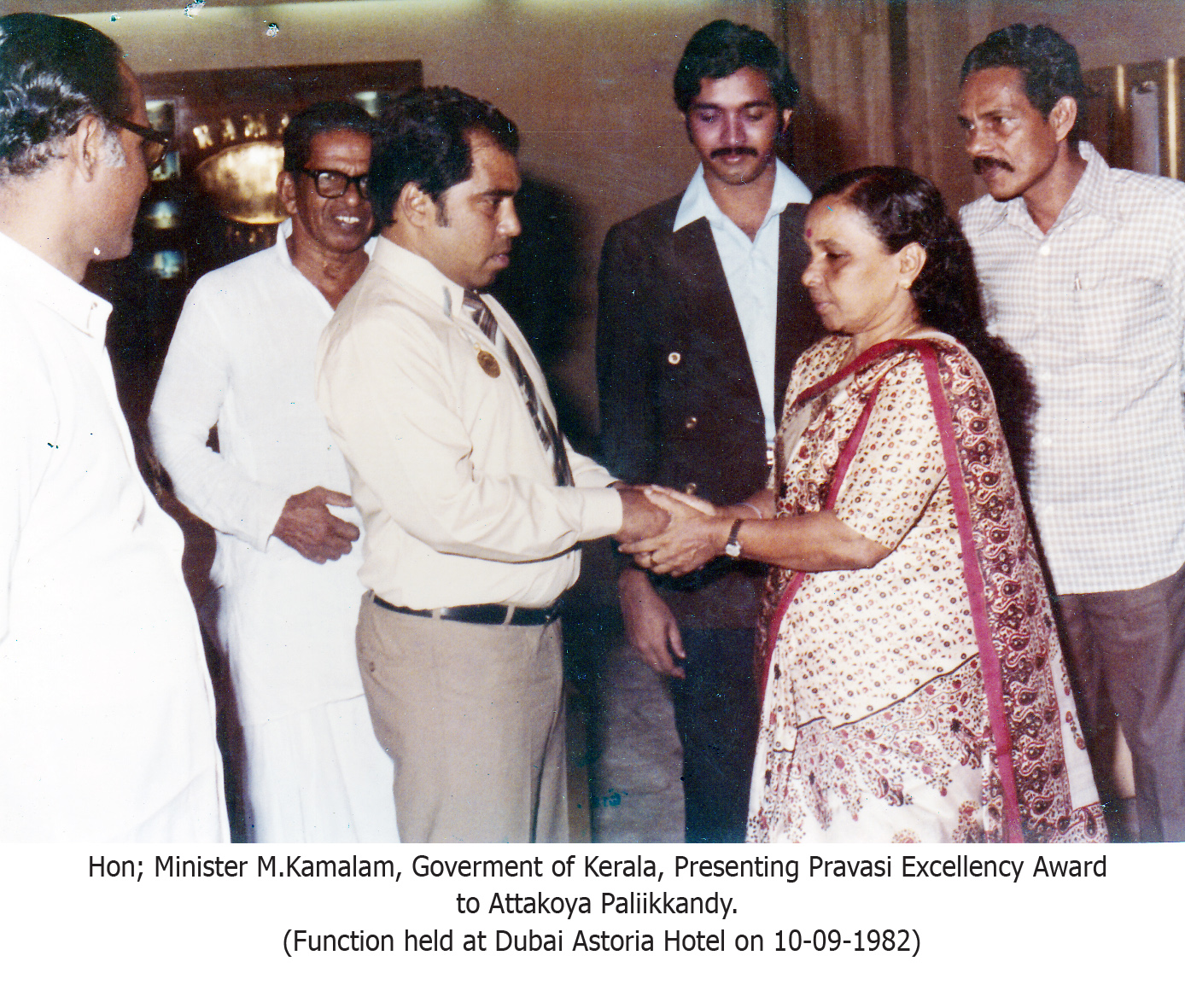
- M. Kamalam presenting Pravasi Excellency Award to Attakoya Paliikkandy, in 1982

Cooperation Minister of Kerala
- In office 1982–1987

Kerala Legislative Assembly
- In office 1980–1987
- Preceded by: K. G. Adiyodi
- Succeeded by: M. P. Veerendra Kumar
- Constituency: Kalpetta

Personal details
- Born: 14 August 1926
- Died: 30 January 2020 (aged 93)
- Party: Indian National Congress

M. Kamalam (14 August 1926 – 30 January 2020) was an Indian politician from Kerala belonging to Indian National Congress. She was a member of the Kerala Legislative Assembly and a minister of the Government of Kerala.

== Biography ==
Kamalam was born on 14 August 1926 to Keloth Krishnan and Keloth Janaki. She was a member of the All India Congress Committee. She also served as the vice president and general secretary of the Kerala Pradesh Congress Committee. She was the chairperson of the Kerala Women's Commission too.

Kamalam started her political career as a councillor in Kozhikode Municipal Corporation. She resigned from Congress in protest against the declaration of emergency in 1975 and joined Janata Party. She contested from Calicut in 1977 in Sixth Lok Sabha election but did not win. She was elected as a member of the Kerala Legislative Assembly from Kalpetta in 1980. Later, she joined Indian National Congress. She was also elected from that constituency in 1982. She served as the Cooperative Minister of the Government of Kerala from 1982 to 1987.

Kamalam was married to M. Samikutty. They had four sons and a daughter. The names of their sons are M. Yatheendradas, M. Murali and M. Rajagopal and the name of their lone daughter is Padmaja Charudathan.

Kamalam died on 30 January 2020 at her residence near Nadakkavu in Kozhikode at the age of 93.
