= Kaniyambetta =

Kaniyambetta Pachilakkad
- Village
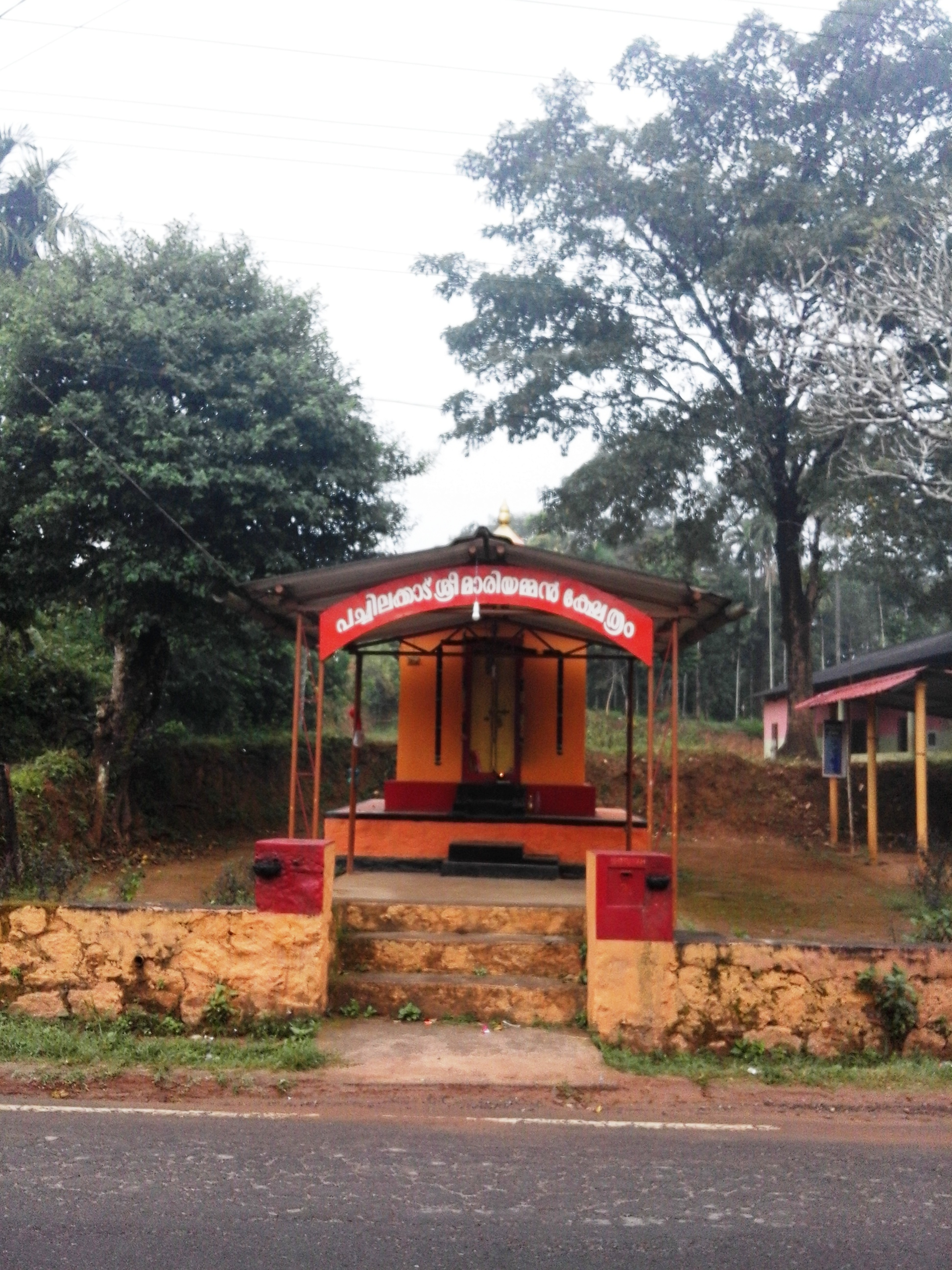
- Pachilakkad temple
- Interactive map of Kaniyambetta
- Coordinates: 11°42′N 76°06′E
- Country: India
- State: Kerala
- District: Wayanad

Languages
  - Official: Malayalam, English
- Time zone: UTC+5:30 (IST)
- ISO 3166 code: IN-KL
- Vehicle registration: KL-12
- Coastline: 0 kilometres (0 mi)

Kaniyambetta or Pachilakkad is a village in the Wayanad district of Kerala state, southern India. It is located approximately 8 km from the district capital, Kalpetta.

Agriculture is the mainstay of the economy with coffee, black pepper and vanilla being the main cash crops.

The village includes St. George Orthodox Church which is part of the Sultan Bathery Diocese of the MOSC Malankara Orthodox Syrian Church.

== Transportation ==
Kaniambetta can be accessed from Mananthavady or Kalpetta. The Periya ghat road connects Mananthavady to Kannur and Thalassery. The Thamarassery mountain road connects Calicut with Kalpetta. The Kuttiady mountain road connects Vatakara with Kalpetta and Mananthavady. The Palchuram mountain road connects Kannur and Iritty with Mananthavady. The road from Nilambur to Ooty is also connected to Wayanad through the village of Meppadi.

The nearest railway station is at Mysore and the nearest airports are Kozhikode International Airport-120 km, Bengaluru International Airport-290 km, and Kannur International Airport, 58 km.

== Pachilakkad Junction ==
Pachilakkad or The Green Leaf Forest is an important junction on the Mananthavady-Kalpetta route. The road from Bathery to Mananthavady meets the main road here. There are three big temples, one mosque and one christian counselling center in this junction.

== Prasanthi Counselling Center ==
Prasanthi Family Counselling Center is a jesuit organization based in Pachilakkad junction of Kaniyambetta village. The Centre conducts marriage counseling, workshops and seminars.

== Image gallery ==
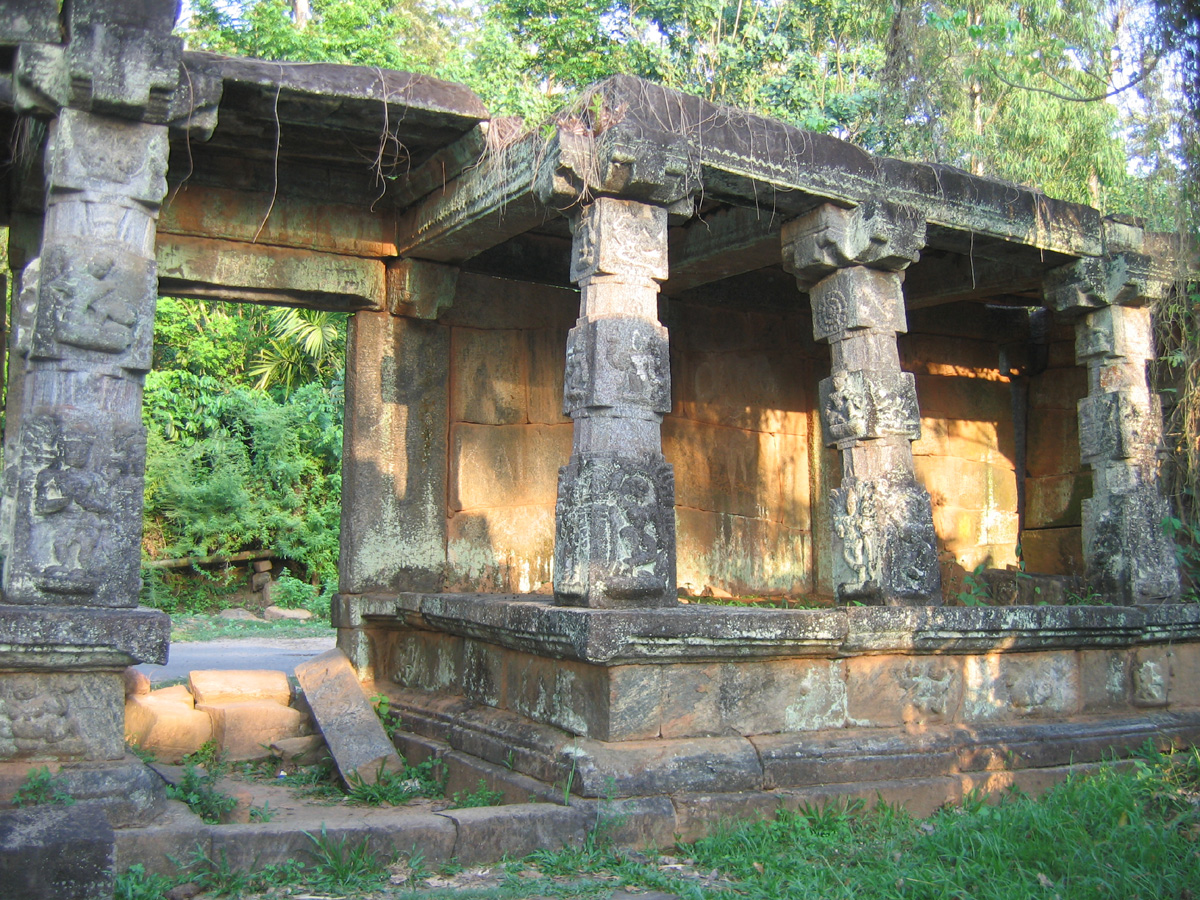
Puthanathani temple

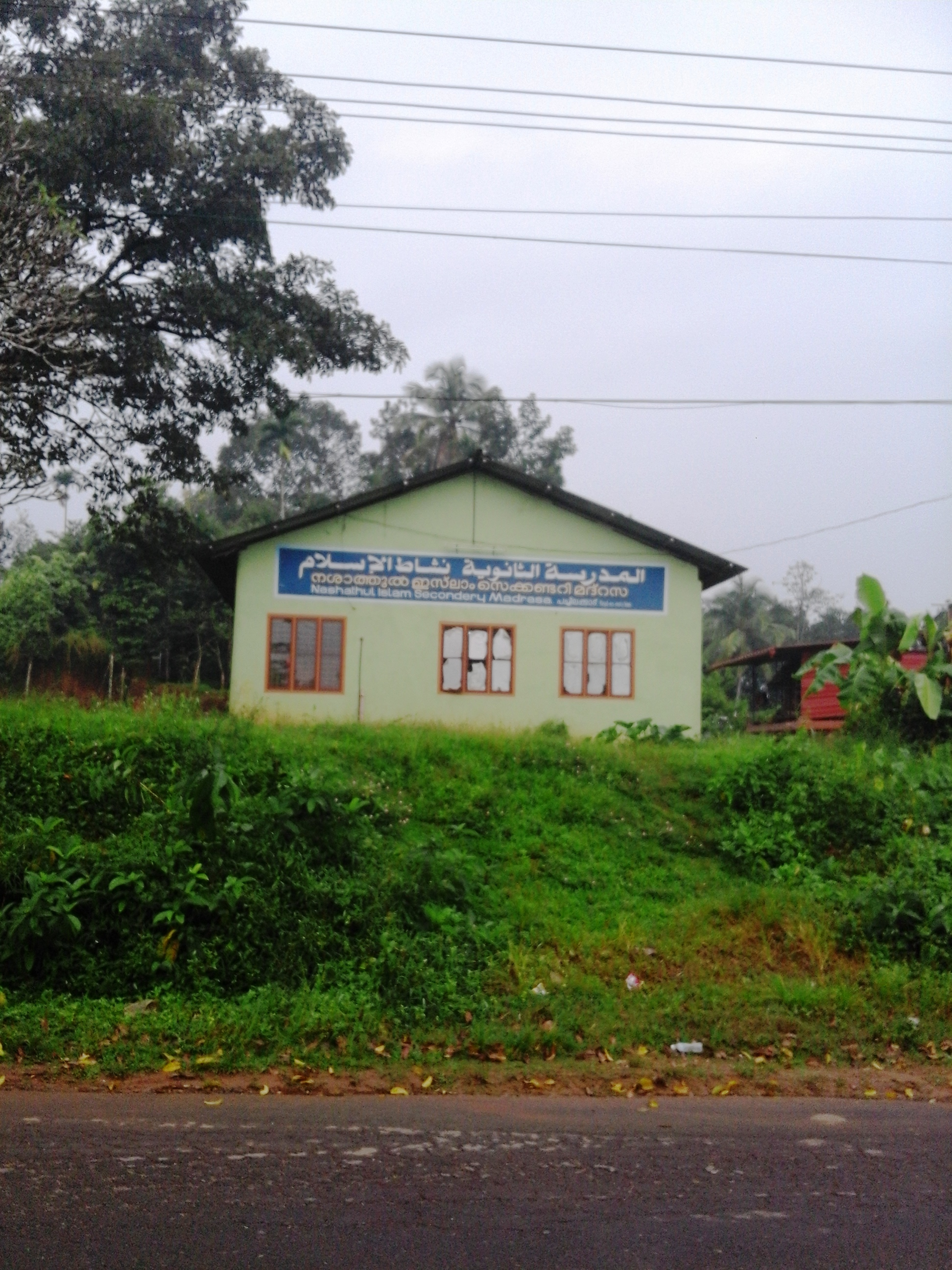
Pachilakkad madrassa

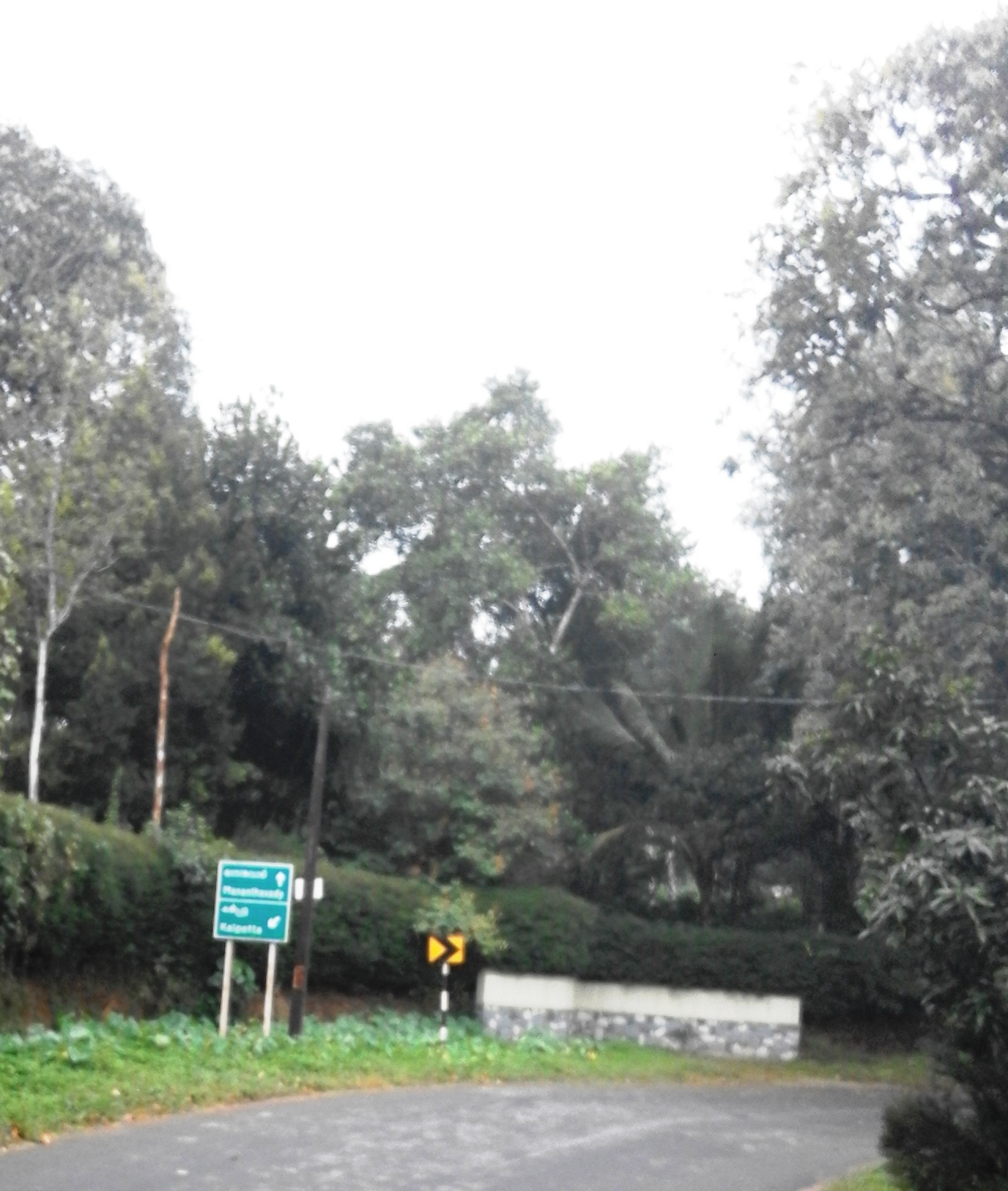
Pachilakkad junction

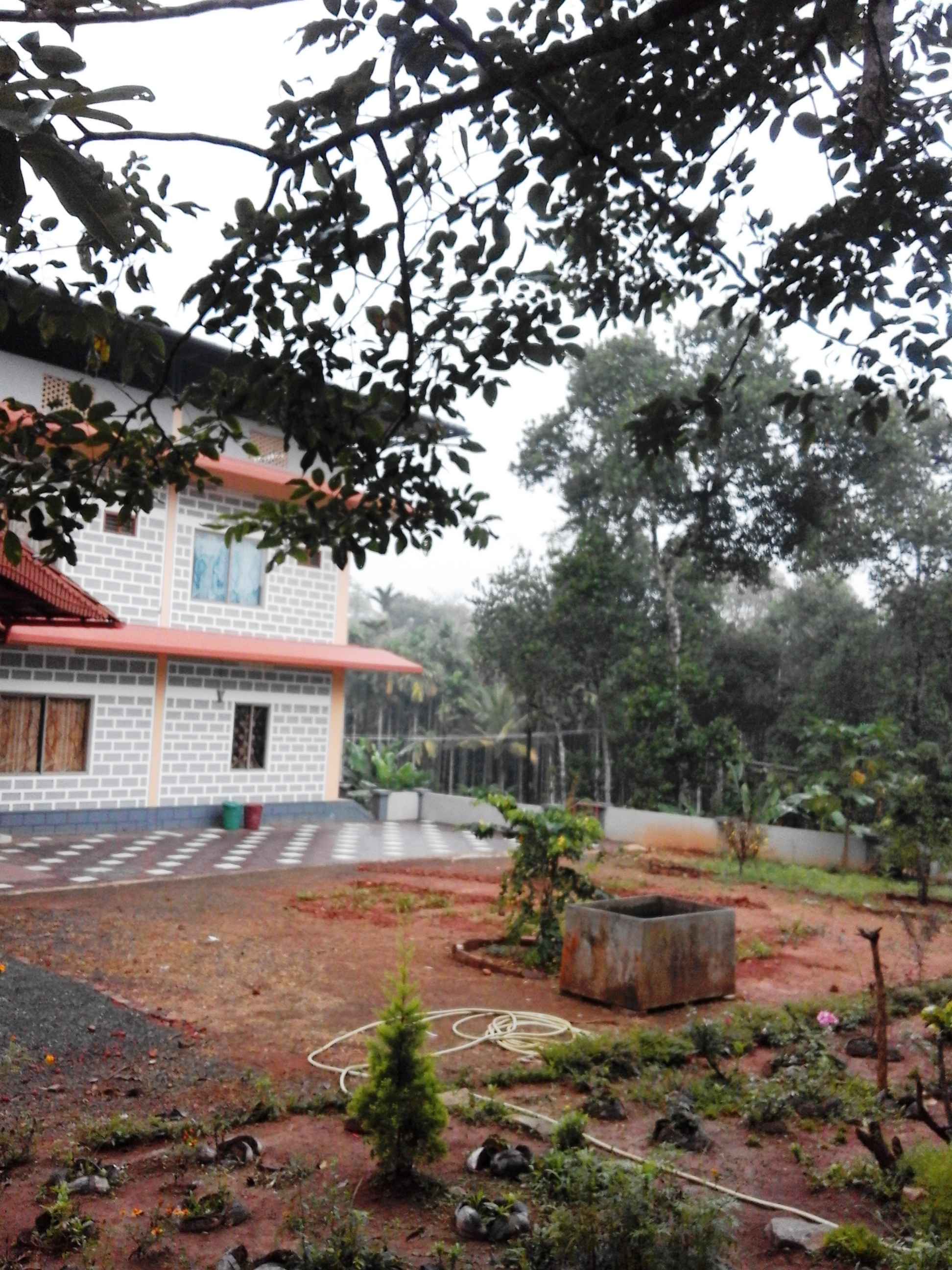
Prasanthi Church

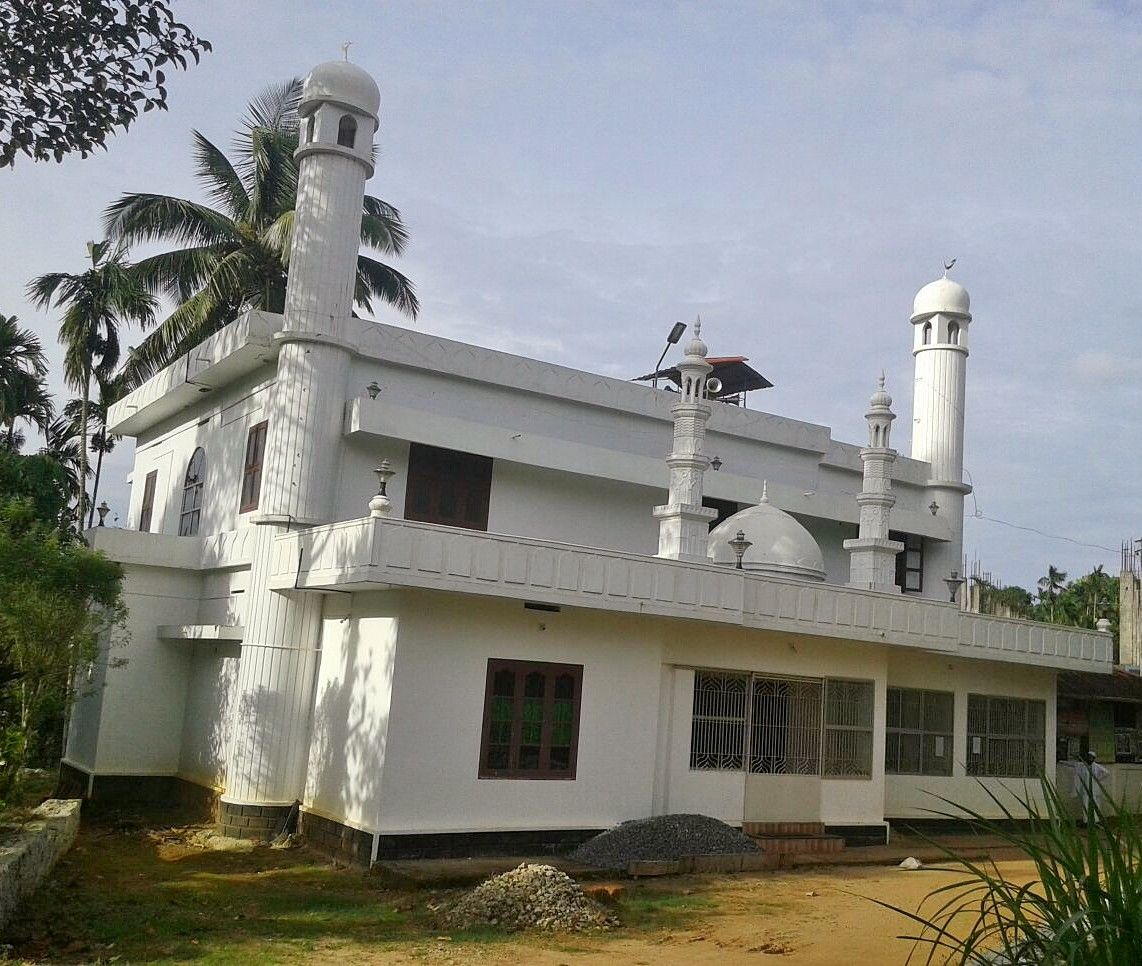
Paralikkunnu Juma Masjid
