= Pasmanda Muslim Mahaz =

Indian Muslim activist organization

- Abbreviation: PMM
- Formation: 1998
- Founder: Ali Anwar
- Type: NGO
- Legal status: Active
- Purpose: Giving SC status to all Dalit Muslims
- Headquarters: New Delhi
- Region served: India
- President: Ali Anwar

Pasmanda Muslim Mahaz (Urdu: پسماندہ مسلم محاذ, lit. 'Marginalised Muslim Front') is an Indian Muslim activist organization based in Patna, Bihar. Founded in 1998, it represents the concerns of the "Pasmanda" Muslims, a new identity that integrates the Dalit Muslims (Arzals) and backward-caste Muslims (Ajlafs). The organization represents the union of several Dalit and backward-caste Muslim organisations under the leadership of Ali Anwar, who is himself a backward-caste Muslim of the Ansari (weaver) caste.

== History ==
Anwar founded the organization after observing caste oppression by upper caste Ashraf Muslims on Dalit Muslims, causing him to become a leftist and associate with the Communist Party of India (Marxist). He assembled a loose coalition of social reform organizations bringing awareness towards the plight of the Dalit Muslims and their complete neglect and discrimination by the upper-caste Ashraf Muslims in India. The Mahaz is a broad front of several Dalit and Backward Caste Muslim organizations from different states of India, particularly Bihar, Uttar Pradesh, Jharkhand, West Bengal and Delhi.

The position of the Mahaz reflects that of Anwar, who posits that upper-caste Muslims have been trying to marginalize the Badzaat Dalit Muslims by slyly asking for quotas for "Backward-class Muslims" while excluding the Muslim Dalits from this label. They oppose religion-based reservations on grounds of socio-economic conditions and not religion as the basis of reservation. Ali Anwar has said he has been networking with Muslim members across the political spectrum to raise the issue in the Parliament of India.

== Objectives ==
The Pasmanda Muslim Mahaz advocates for Dalit Muslims concerning the issues of personal law, reservation and electoral politics, as well as demands of legal action against officials who physically attack Dalit Muslims. They have also advocated for the rights of Dalit Muslims to bury their dead in conventional graveyards instead of segregated ones, as mandated by the prevailing caste norms in regions like Bihar.

However, late historian scholar Papiya Ghosh noted that the Mahaz does not address gender issues and expects the Pasanda women to remain in purdah while the Ashraf women feel free to dispense with it.

== Reception ==
As per Pasmanda Muslims, upper-caste Muslims in India have tried to label the people of the Mahaz as "Badzaat un-Islamic heretics", which the Mahaz protests as a form of propaganda against them.

== See also ==
- Dalit
- Untouchability
- Caste system in India
- Caste system among Muslims
- Halalkhor

== Bibliography ==
- Ansari, Khalid Anis (2021). "Pluralism and the Post-Minority Condition". In Boaventura De Sousa Santos; Bruno Sena Martins (eds.). The Pluriverse of Human Rights: The Diversity of Struggles for Dignity: The Diversity of Struggles for Dignity. Routledge. ISBN 978-1-00-039570-9.
