= Vengappally =

- village
- Location in Kerala, India Vengappally (India)
- Coordinates: 11°38′0″N 76°1′0″E
- Country: India
- State: Kerala
- District: Wayanad

Population (2011)
  - Total: 11,692

Languages
  - Official: Malayalam, English
- Time zone: UTC+5:30 (IST)
- PIN: 673121
- Telephone code: 20****[BSNL Land line], 21****[BSNL Wireless Land line]
- Vehicle registration: KL-12

Vengappally is a village in Wayanad district in the state of Kerala, India.

== Demographics ==
As of 2011 India census, Vengappally had a population of 11692 with 5705 males and 5987 females.

== Transport ==
Vengappally can be accessed via Padinjarathara or Kalpetta. The distance (in km) from vengappally to some major destinations are as follows:

- Kozhikode (79)
- Mysore (137)
- Ooty (121)
- Madikeri (119)
- Bangalore (275)
- Cochin (275)
- Sulthan Bathery (32)
- Padinjarathara (10)
- Kalpetta (7)

The nearest major airport is at Calicut. The road to the east connects to Mysore and Bangalore. Night journey is allowed on this sector as it goes through Bandipur national forest. The nearest railway station is Mysore. There are airports at Bangalore and Calicut.

== Shamsul Ulama Academy ==
Shamsul Ulama Islamic Academy (مجمع شمس العلماء الإسلامي) is an Islamic educational institution in Vengappally. It was established by the SKSSF Wayanad District Committee under the presidency of late District Qasi Panakkad Sayed Umerali Shihab Thangal in the year 2002 to promote Islamic educational activities. SUIA is managed by president Sayed Hyderali Shihab Thangal Panakkad.
