= Pozhuthana =

- village
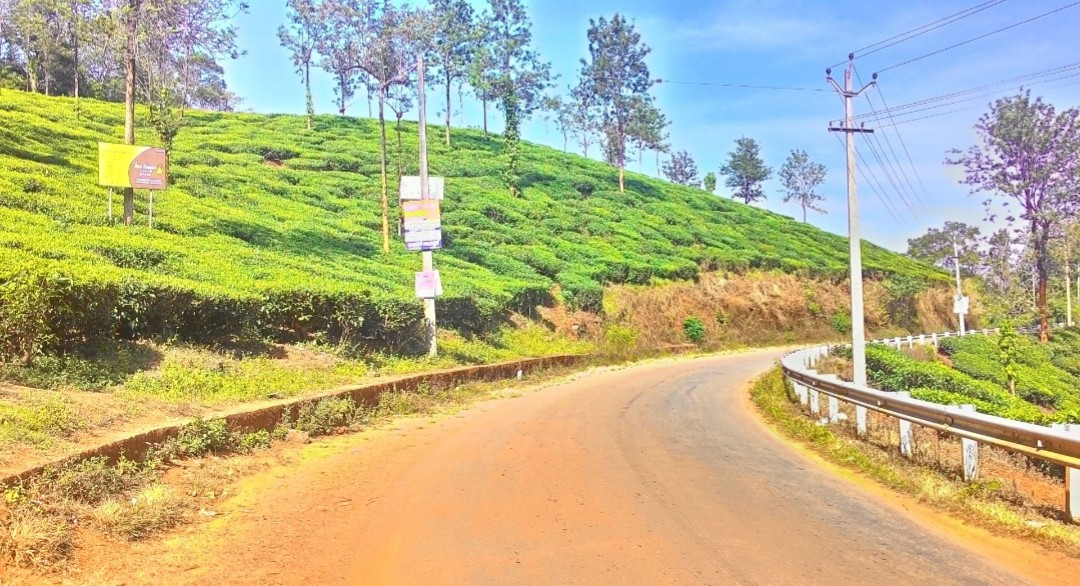
- Interactive map of Pozhuthana
- Country: India
- District: Wayanad

Population (2011)
  - Total: 6,406

Languages
- Time zone: UTC+5:30 (IST)
- PIN: 673575
- Vehicle registration: KL-12
- Website: lsgkerala.in/pozhuthanapanchayat/

Pozhuthana is a village in Wayanad district in the state of Kerala, India.

== Physiography, relief and drainage ==
The panchayat comes under the highland region of Wayanad district and consists of many undulating hills intersected by valleys. In general, the area is having hilly to undulating topography with flat-bottomed valleys. Relief of the area is subnormal to normal.

== Demographics ==
As of 2011 India census, Pozhuthana had a population of 6,406, with 3,099 males and 3,307 females.

== Geographic location ==
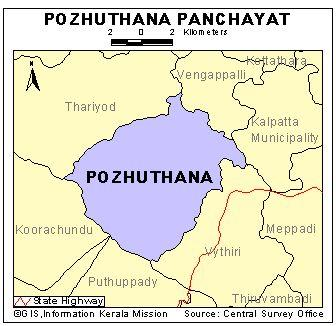
Pozhuthana Panchayath Map

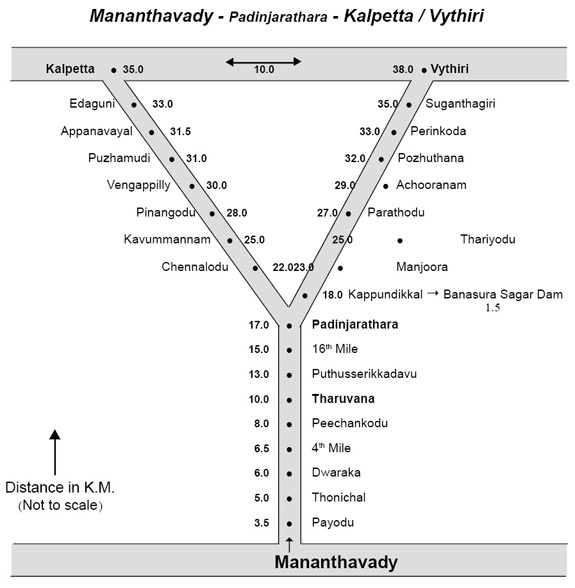
Route map

Pozhuthana panchayat in Vythiri taluk of Wayanad district is located about 8 km west of Kalpetta town. It is bounded on the north by Thariode panchayats, south by vythiri taluk panchayat, east by Kalpetta municipality and west by Kozhikode District. It lies between 11°31’57" and 11°37’53" north latitude and 75°56’38" and 76°03’21" east longitude.

The panchayat is mostly drained by Pozhuthana river and the streamlets draining into it. The Pozhuthana River flows through the middle of the panchayat from south to north and finally drains into Kabani River. The panchayat area is moderately well drained to well drained and exhibits a dendritic drainage pattern. The depth of ground water fluctuates considerably with physiography, but generally remains between a depth of 5–20 m in the elevated areas and 1–5 m in the valleys.

== Demographics ==
As of 2001 India census, Achooranam had a population of 9754 with 4755 males and 4999 females.

== Transportation ==
Puzhuthana is 74 km by road from Kozhikode railway station and this road includes nine hairpin bends. The nearest major airport is at Calicut. The road to the east connects to Mysore and Bangalore. Night journey is allowed on this sector as it goes through Bandipur national forest. The nearest railway station is Mysore. There are airports at Bangalore and Calicut. Pozhuthana is 5 kilometers from Vythiri town.
