= Muppainad =

- Village
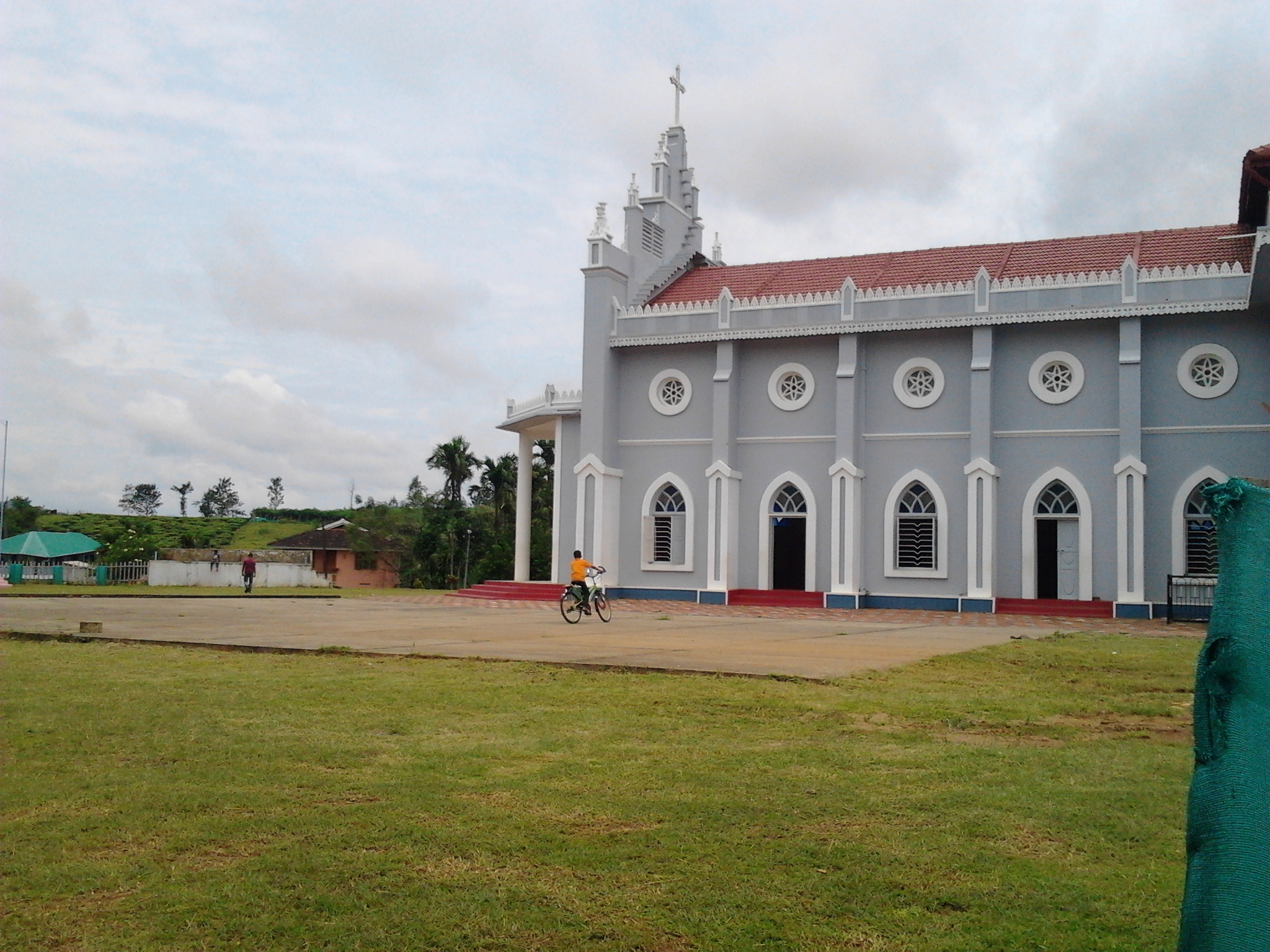
- Muppainad Church
- Interactive map of Muppainad
- Country: India
- State: Kerala
- District: Wayanad

Population (2011)
  - Total: 22,892

Languages
  - Official: Malayalam, English
- Time zone: UTC+5:30 (IST)
- PIN: 673581
- Vehicle registration: KL-12

Muppainad is a village near Meppadi in Wayanad district in the state of Kerala, India.

== Demographics ==
As of 2011 India census, Muppainad had a population of 22,892 with 11,140 males and 11,752 females.

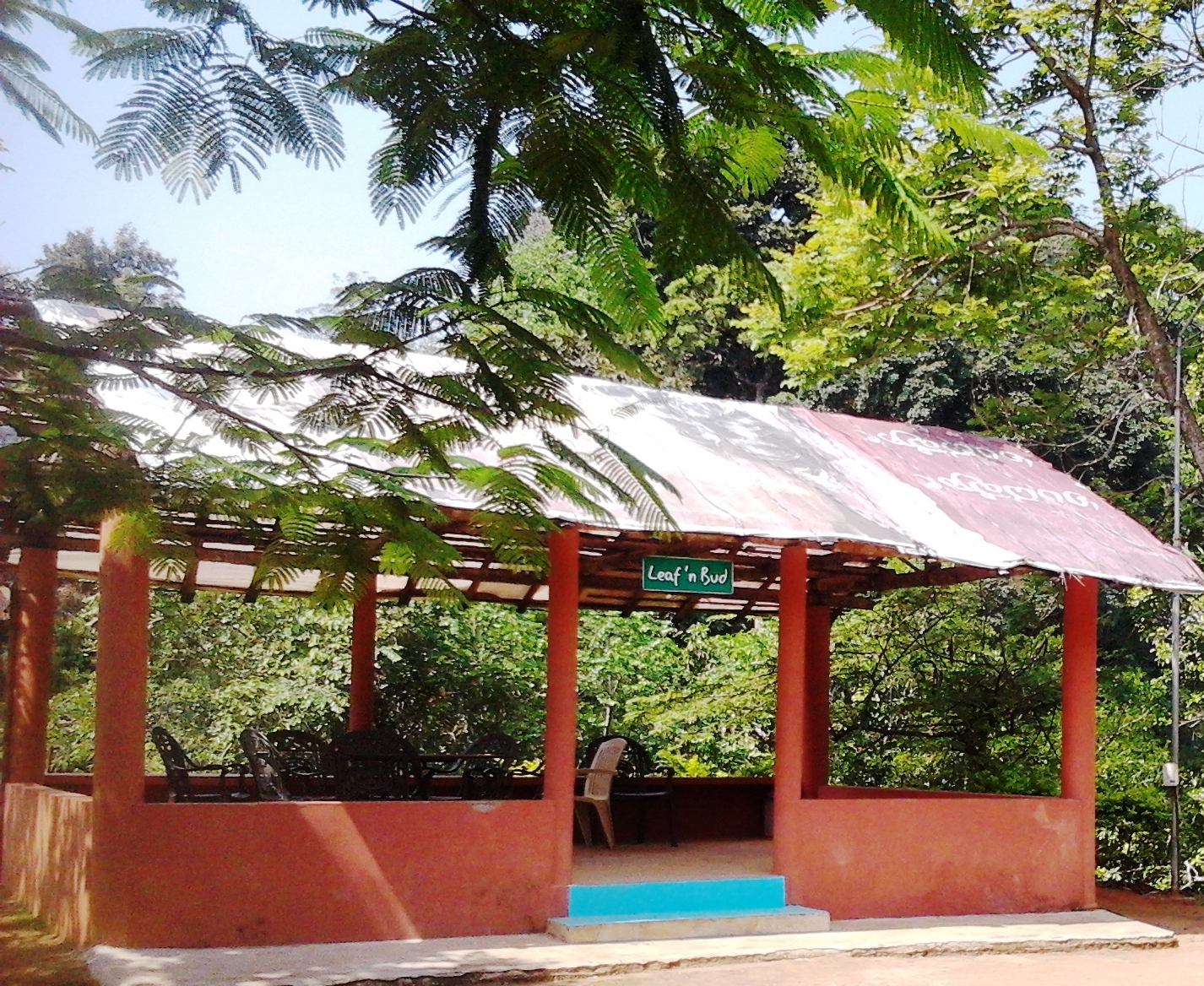
Meenmutty Falls, Vaduvanchal

== Transportation ==
Muppainad is 82 km by road from Kozhikode railway station and this road includes nine hairpin bends. The nearest major airport is at Calicut. The road to the east connects to Mysore and Bangalore. Night journey is allowed on this sector as it goes through Bandipur national forest. The nearest railway station is Mysore. There are airports at Bangalore and Calicut.
