= Socialist Janata (Democratic) =

Socialist Janata (Democratic) Party
- President: M.P. Veerendra Kumar
- Secretary: Varghese George
- Founded: 7 August 2010
- Dissolved: 29 December 2014
- Split from: Janata Dal (Secular)
- Merged into: Janata Dal (United) (2014-2018)
- Succeeded by: Loktantrik Janata Dal
- Headquarters: YMCA Cross Road, Calicut–673001, Kerala
- Ideology: Secularism; Democratic socialism
- ECI status: Registered Unrecognized

Socialist Janata (Democratic) Party broke away from Janata Dal (Secular). It merged with Janata Dal (United) on 29 December 2014.

== History ==
The Kerala unit of the Janata Dal (Secular) is a part of the CPI (M)-led Left Democratic Front. The CPI(M)-JD(S) ties came under strain around 2008. Things worsened when the CPI(M) hesitated to give the JD(S) seat of the Kozhikode parliamentary constituency, in the 2009 Lok Sabha election, and the leading newspaper Mathrubhumi published lavalin issues, which is against Pinarayi vijayan. He got angry with the managing director of Mathrubhumi and the chief of SJ(D) MP Virendra Kumar. A major portion of the JD(S) led by M.P. Veerendra Kumar aligned with the United Democratic Front and launched the Socialist Janata (Democratic) Party on 7 August 2010. It merged with Janata Dal (United) on 29 December 2014.

In 2018, the Veerendra Kumar fraction of the Janata Dal (United) unit of Kerala under the leadership of M. P. Veerendra Kumar merged with Loktantrik Janata Dal.

== Leaders ==
- M. P. Veerendrakumar
- K. P. Mohanan
- M. V. Shreyams Kumar
- V. Surendran Pillai
- Varghese George
- Sheikh. P. Harris
- Gregorious Sakaria
- Manayath Chandran
- Charupara Ravi
- K. Shankaran Master
- Augustin Kolenchery
- V Kunjali
- Koran Master
- A.V Ramachandran
- Saleem Madavoor
- Ugin Morely
- Sabah Pulpatta
- N.C Moyinkutty
- T.M Sivarajan
- Mujeeb Rahman

== See also ==
- Indian Socialist Janata Dal
