= M. P. Veerendra Kumar =

Indian politician and writer (1936–2020)

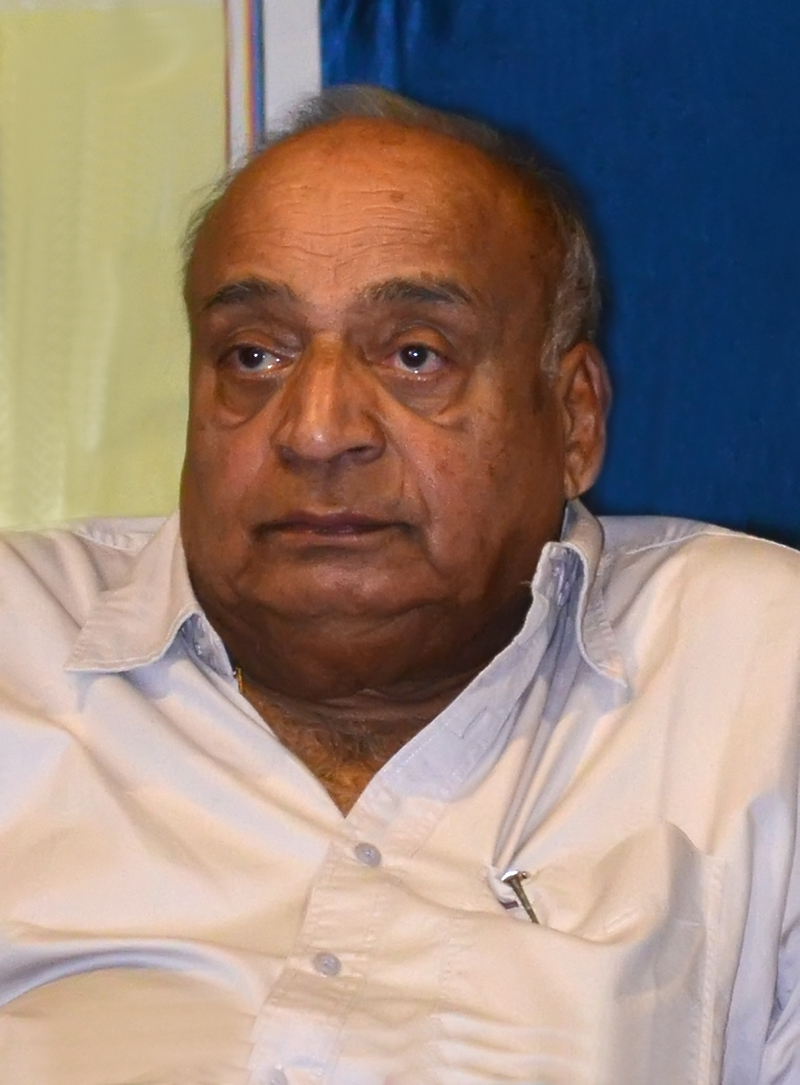

Minister of State for Finance, Government of India
- In office 21 February 1997 – 09 June 1997
- President: Dr. Shankar Dayal Sharma
- Prime Minister: H. D. Devegowda
- Preceded by: P. Chidambaram
- Succeeded by: Satpal Maharaj

Minister of state for Labour and Employment (Independent charge), Urban Development, Parliamentary Affairs, Government of India
- In office 10 June 1997 – 19 March 1998
- Prime Minister: I. K. Gujral
- Preceded by: S. R. Balasubramaniam
- Succeeded by: Ram Naik

Minister of Forest , Government of Kerala
- In office 1987–1987
- Chief Minister: E. K. Nayanar
- Preceded by: K. P. Nooruddin
- Succeeded by: Pinarayi Vijayan
- Constituency: Kalpetta

Member of Parliament, Rajya Sabha
- In office 2016–2020
- Prime Minister: Narendra Modi
- Preceded by: Himself
- Succeeded by: M. V. Shreyams Kumar
- Constituency: Kerala

Member of Parliament, Lok Sabha
- In office 05 May 2004 – 05 May 2009
- Prime Minister: Dr. Manmohan Singh
- Preceded by: K. Muraleedharan
- Succeeded by: M. K. Raghavan
- In office 10 May 1996 – 3 March 1998
- Preceded by: K. Muraleedharan
- Succeeded by: K. Muraleedharan
- Constituency: Kozhikode

Member of Legislative Assembly, Kerala
- In office 1987–1991
- Chief Minister: E. K. Nayanar
- Preceded by: M. Kamalam
- Succeeded by: K. K. Ramachandran
- Constituency: Kalpetta

President of Loktantrik Janata Dal Kerala state
- In office 2016–2020
- Preceded by: Position Created
- Succeeded by: Position Abolished, Merged to RJD

Personal details
- Born: 15 August 1937 Kalpetta, Wayanad, Kerala, India
- Died: 28 May 2020 (aged 83) Kozhikode, Kerala, India
- Party: Loktantrik Janata Dal (from 24 March 2018)
- Other political affiliations: Janata Dal (United) (till 20 December 2017), Socialist Janata (Democratic), Janata Dal (Secular)
- Parents: M. K. Padmaprabha Goudar; Marudevi Avva
- Education: Ramakrishna Mission Vivekananda College, Chennai (Master of Philosophy); University of Cincinnati, Ohio (Master of Business Administration)
- As of 23 September, 2006

Maniyankode Padmaprabha Veerendra Kumar (15 August 1937 — 28 May 2020) was an Indian politician, writer and journalist, Former Union Minister of state for Finance in Devegowda Ministry and Union Minister of state for Labour and Employment (Independent charge ), Parliamentary Affairs, Urban Development in Gujral Ministry. He was as a Member of Parliament in Rajya Sabha and Representing the state of Kerala and member of the 14th Lok Sabha. During the period of 1987 Virendra kumar elected member of Kerala Legislative Assembly from Kalpetta Constituency. He was a member of the Loktantrik Janata Dal political party and president of the Kerala state branch of the party. He was also the chairman and managing director of the Malayalam daily newspaper Mathrubhumi.

== Life ==
Veerendra Kumar was born on 22 July 1936 to Marudevi Avva and M. K. Padmaprabha Goudar, a leader of Socialist Party and former MLA, in Kalpetta. Veerendra Kumar belonged to a family with deep roots in the Jain community of Kerala. The eldest of their eight children, he had six younger sisters and a younger brother. After schooling in Kalpetta and Kozhikode, he did his master's in philosophy from the Ramakrishna Mission Vivekananda College.

As a politician, he was treasurer and a national committee member of the former Samyukta Socialist Party, state secretary of the Kerala Unit of the Socialist Party, one of the all India secretaries of the former Socialist Party, convener of the Opposition Co-ordination Committee in Kerala, vice president of the former Janata Party, and its president. He was arrested during The Emergency. From 1987–91 he was a member of the Kerala Legislative Assembly. Later, in 1996 he was elected to the Lok Sabha, lower house of the Parliament of India from Kozhikode constituency and served as Union Minister of State for Finance in Deve Gowde Ministry from 21 February 1997 to 7 June 1997. He also served as Union Minister for Labour (Independent charge) with additional charges as Minister of State, Urban Affairs & Employment (Independent charges) and Parliamentary Affairs in I.K.Gujral Ministry from 10 June 1997 to March.

He died on 28 May 2020 due to cardiac arrest at Kozhikode in Kerala. He was aged 83 when he died, and was suffering from many age-related illnesses. He was cremated with full state honours at the premises of his ancestral home in Kalpetta. He is survived by his daughters Asha, Nisha and Jayalakshmi, son M.V. Sreyamskumar (Also a politician, currently serving as the Managing Director of Mathrubhumi), and many grandchildren. Usha Veerandrakumar, his wife, too outlived for two years, dying on 28 October 2022.

== Electoral History ==
=== Lok Sabha ===
Year	Constituency	Party	Votes	%	Opponent	Party	Votes	%	Result	Margin	%
1971	Kozhikode	SSP	44,758	12.33	Ibrahim Sulaiman Sait	IUML	195,206	53.76	Lost	▼150,448	▼41.43
1991	Calicut	JD	339,229	45.40	K. Muraleedharan	INC	355,113	47.53	Lost	▼15,884	▼2.13
1996	Calicut	JD	355,565	47.89	K. Muraleedharan	INC	316,862	42.68	Won	▲38,703	▲5.21
1998	Calicut	JD	337,735	42.89	Adv. P. Sankaran	INC	356,392	45.26	Lost	▼18,657	▼2.37
2004	Calicut	JD(S)	340,111	43.54	Adv V Balaram	INC	274,785	35.18	Won	▲65,326	▲8.36
2014	Palakkad	SJ(D)	307,597	33.78	M. B. Rajesh	CPI(M)	412,897	45.35	Lost	▼105,300	▼11.57

=== Rajya Sabha ===
Position	Party	Constituency	From	To	Tenure
Member of Parliament, Rajya Sabha (1st Term)	JD(U)	Kerala	3 April 2016	20 Dec 2017	1 year, 261 days
Member of Parliament, Rajya Sabha (2nd Term)	IND	Kerala	26 March 2018	28 May 2020	2 years, 63 days

== Publications ==
His works as an author include:

- Samanwayathinte Vasantham
- Buddhante Chiri
- Gattum Kanacharadukalum
- Atmavilekkoru Theerthayathra
- Prathibhayute Verukal Thedi
- Changampuzha: Vidhiyute Vettamrigam
- Thirinjhunokkumbol
- Lokavyapara Samkhadanayum Oorakkudukkukalum (Gattinu Seshamulla Oranweshanam)
- Roshathinte Vithukal
- Adhinivesathinte Adiyozhukukal
- Hymavathabhoovil
- Ramantedhukkam
- Vivekanandan: Sanyasiyum Manushyanum

== Awards ==
- V. R. Krishnan Ezhuthachan Janmasadabdi Award (2009)
- Kendra Sahitya Academy Award (2010) - for Haimavatha bhoovil

Lok Sabha
Preceded by K. Muraleedharan	Member of Parliament for Kozhikode; 1996 – 1998	Succeeded by P. Sankaran
Preceded by K. Muraleedharan	Member of Parliament for Kozhikode; 2004 - 2009	Succeeded by M. K. Raghavan
