= Subdivisions of Kerala =

Articles on the Corporations, Municipalities and Taluks of Kerala may be found at:

== Political divisions ==
- Municipal corporations in Kerala
- Municipalities of Kerala

== Administrative divisions ==
- Taluks of Kerala
- Revenue divisions of Kerala
- List of districts in Kerala
