= Dalit Muslim =

Lower status Muslims in India

Dalit Muslim is a term used to refer to Muslims in the Dalit group, i.e. the social group called Untouchables or Dalits, who have converted to Islam. In theory, converting to Islam takes converts out of the bounds of earlier caste system, but in practice they are often still treated as Dalits.

== Background ==
Aftab Alam, a political scientist, states:

"But caste and untouchability is a lived reality for Muslims living in India and South Asia, and untouchability is the community's worst-kept secret."

Even though Islam is egalitarian in its social ethics, Indian Muslim society is characterised by caste-like features, consisting of several caste-like groups (jatis). Despite the conversion to Islam, the social and economic conditions of the Muslims in each caste hardly changed, and they remained tied down to their traditional occupations.

== Reservation ==
In India, Dalit Muslims get the Other Backward Caste reservation, and not the Scheduled Caste reservation afforded to their Hindu, Jain, and Sikh counterparts.

== See also ==
- Pasmanda Muslim Mahaz, the political movement involving Dalit Muslims
- Caste system among South Asian Muslims
