= Muttil, Kalpetta =

Muttil Village
- Village
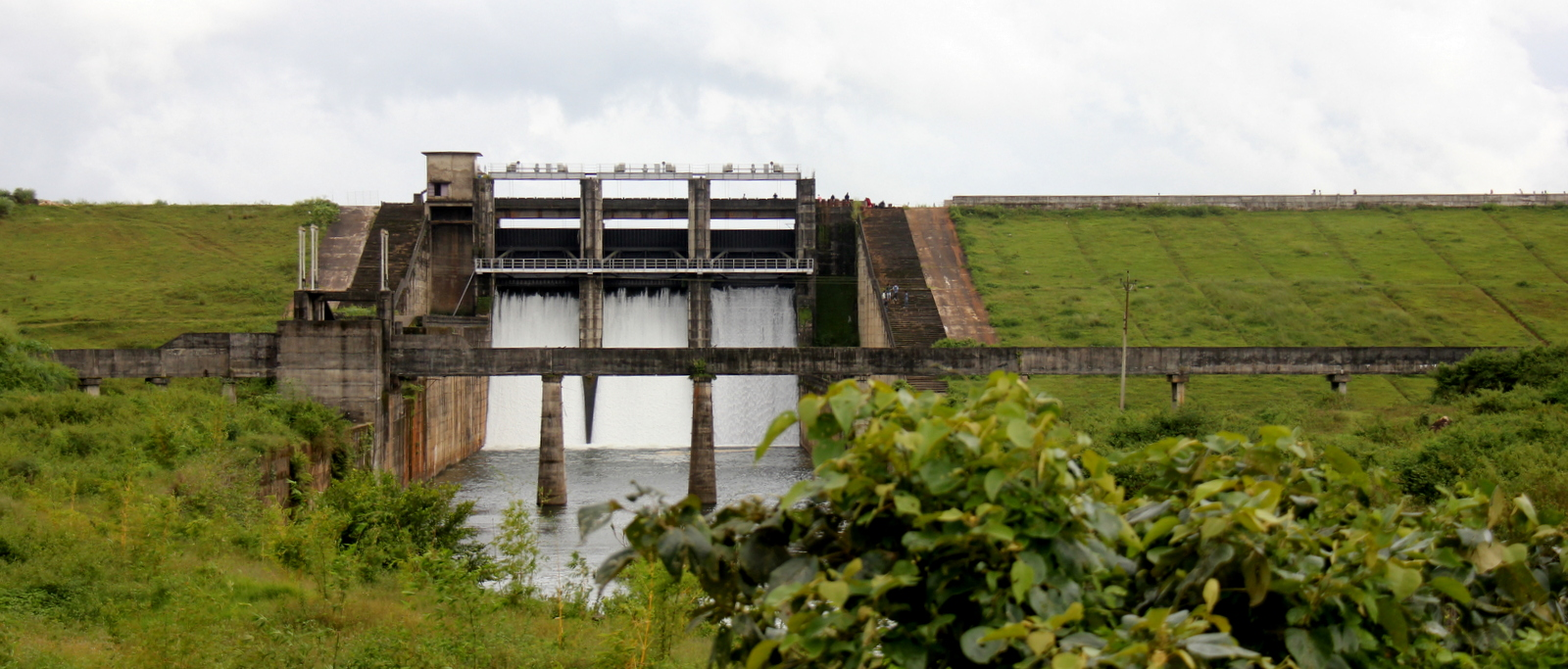
- Interactive map of Muttil Village
- Country: India
- State: Kerala
- District: Wayanad

Languages
  - Official: Malayalam, English
- Time zone: UTC+5:30 (IST)
- PIN: 673122

Muttil is a village in Wayanad district in the state of Kerala, India.

== Demographics ==
- Total Population: 34,737
- As of 2011 India census, Muttil South had a population of 22,355 with 10,807 males and 11,548 females.
- As of 2011 India census, Muttil North had a population of 12,382 with 6,090 males and 6,292 females.
- 19 wards are in panchayath. Main are 3,19 wards : Pariyaram and Chilanjichal
- Muttil is located near Kalpetta and develops very fast as well as Kalpetta

== Transportation ==
Muttil is 76 km away from Kozhikode city and the road NH 766 connects Kozhikode and Kollagal includes nine hairpin bends. The nearest major airport is at Calicut. The road to the east connects to Mysore and Bangalore. Night journey is not allowed on this sector as it goes through Bandipur national forest. The nearest railway station is at Kozhikode.
