= Loktantrik Janata Dal =

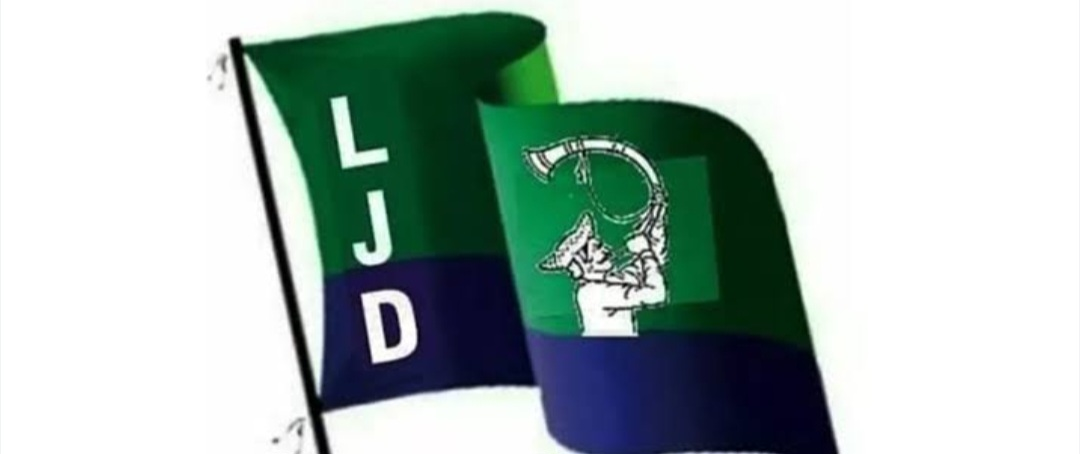
- Abbreviation: LJD
- President: Javed Raza
- General Secretary: Zubair Ahmad Qureshi
- Founder: Sharad Yadav; Ali Anwar; M.P. Veerendra Kumar; Zubair Ahmad Qureshi; Javed Raza
- Founded: 18 May 2018 (7 years ago)
- Merger of: Bahujan Mukti Party
- Split from: Janata Dal (United)
- Headquarters: Sharad Yadav Bhawan, H.No.BP 8, DDA Flats, Bindapur, Dwaraka, New Delhi, New Delhi district, New Delhi - 110059
- Youth wing: Lokatantrik Yuva Janata Dal
- Ideology: Socialism; Mulnivasism; Bahujanism
- ECI Status: Registered Political Party

Website
- loktantrikjanatadal.org

The Loktantrik Janata Dal (LJD) was a recognised registered political party in India. It was nationally launched by Sharad Yadav, Ali Anwar and Zubair Ahmad Qureshi in May 2018. The party was formed after Yadav parted ways from Janata Dal (United), due to its alliance with Bharatiya Janata Party in Bihar. Sharad Yadav joined Rashtriya Janata Dal in 2019 but he did not merge his party LJD.

- The Veerendra Kumar fraction of the Janata Dal (United) unit of Kerala under the leadership of M. P. Veerendra Kumar merged with the party.

Sharad Yadav joined Rashtriya Janata Dal (RJD) on 20 March 2022, Sharad Yadav has taken up the task of re-uniting all the former Janata Dal factions and other parties with similar ideologies to put forward a united opposition for 2024 Lok Sabha elections. After Sharad Yadav death in 2023 party made his president to Javed Raza.

- Though the Kerala unit led by M. V. Shreyams Kumar of the party join RJD. The Kerala faction merged with Rashtriya Janata Dal (RJD) on 12 October 2023.
