= Kalpetta =

Town in Kerala, India

Kalpetta കൽപ്പറ്റ
- Municipality
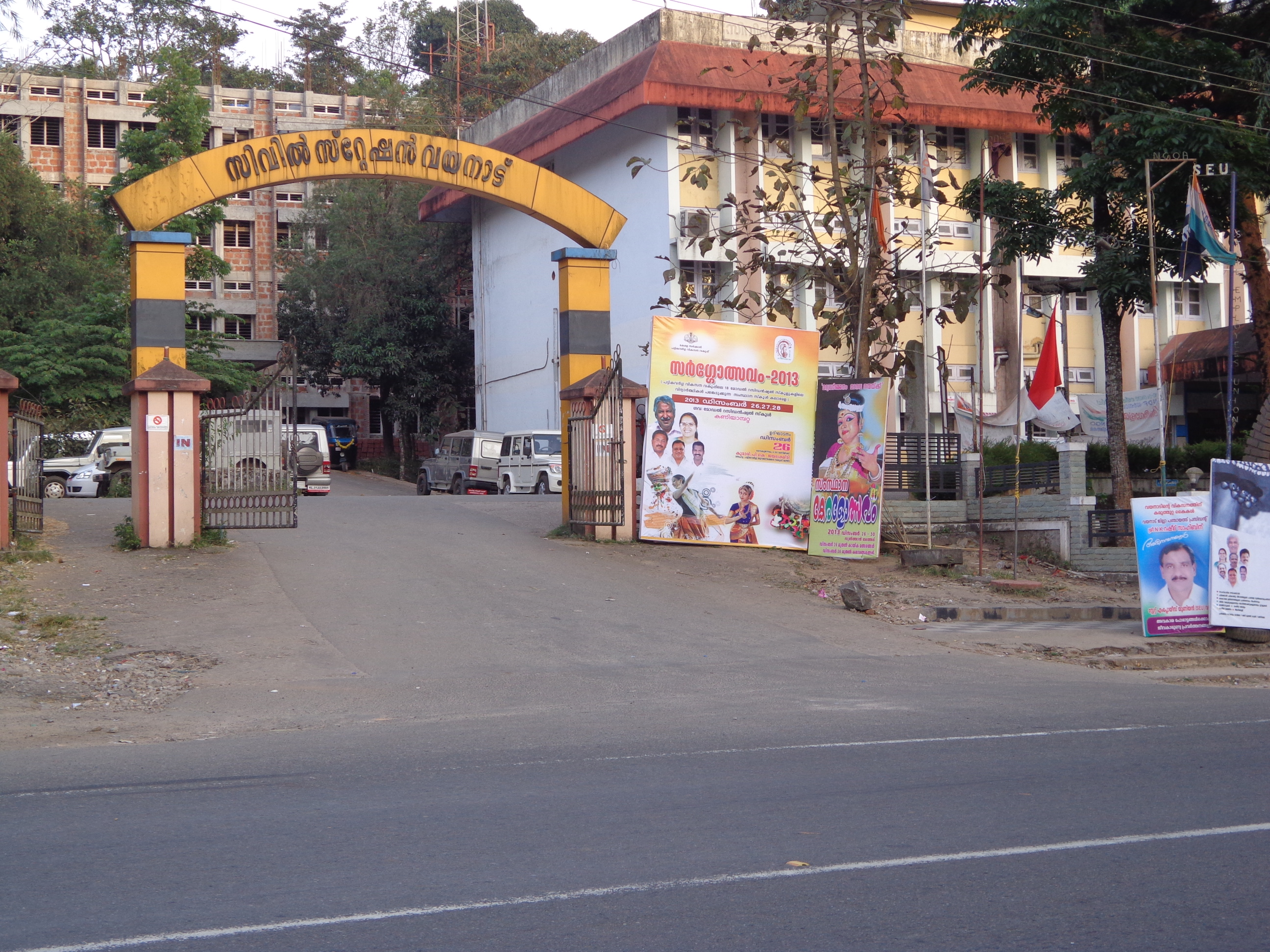
- Kalpetta Civil Station complex entrance in December, 2013

- Location in Kerala, India Kalpetta (India)
- Coordinates: 11°36′37.161″N 76°4′58.001″E
- Country: India
- State: Kerala
- District: Wayanad

Government
  - Type: Grade II Municipality
  - Body: Kalpetta Municipality
  - Chairperson: P Viswanathan (CPIM)
  - Vice Chairperson: S. Soumya
  - Member of Parliament: Priyanka Gandhi (Indian National Congress)
  - Member of Legislative Assembly: T.Siddique (Indian National Congress)

Area
  - Total: 50.74 km^{2} (19.59 sq mi)
- Elevation: 780 m (2,560 ft)

Population (2011)
  - Total: 31,580
  - Density: 622.4/km^{2} (1,612/sq mi)

Languages
  - Official: Malayalam, English
- Time zone: UTC+5:30 (IST)
- PIN: 673121 (Kalpetta Head PO), 673122 (Kalpetta North)
- Telephone code: +91 4936
- Vehicle registration: KL-12
- Website: kalpettamunicipality.lsgkerala.gov.in/en

Kalpetta is a municipality, taluk and headquarters of the Wayanad district in the Indian state of Kerala. Kalpetta serves as the headquarters of Vythiri taluk. It is surrounded by dense coffee and tea plantations and mountains. It lies on the Kozhikode-Mysore National Highway NH 766 (formerly NH 212) at an altitude of about 780 m above sea level. Kalpetta is located 72 km (45 mi) northeast of Kozhikode and 140 km (87 mi) southeast of Mysore.

== History ==
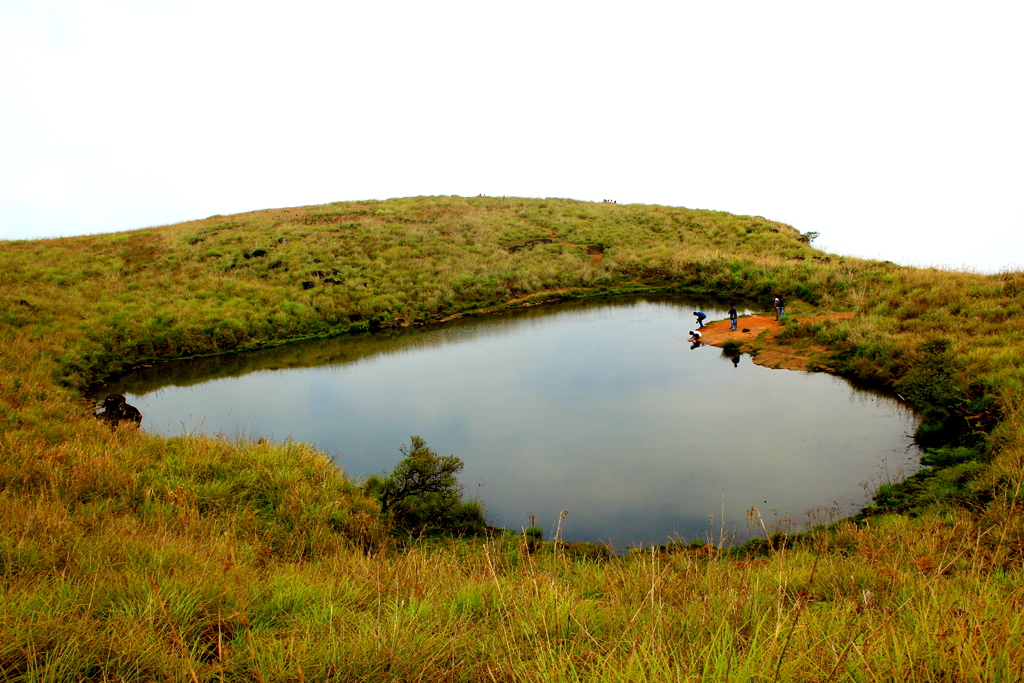
Chambra peak

In Wayanad, the Indian independence movement started first at Kalpetta. The first political conference was held in 1921 under the leadership of Dharmaraja Iyer. K. P. Kesava Menon and A. K. Gopalan participated in this meeting. Formation of the committee of Indian National Congress also occurred around the same time. Mahatma Gandhi visited Kalpetta on 1934 January 14.

Kalpetta became the headquarters when Wayanad district was formed on 1 November 1980. Kalpetta was still a Village Panchayath when it became district headquarters and it attained Municipality status on 1 April 1990.

== Municipality Members ==
Kalpetta Municipality Election Results 2025 (Ward-wise)
Ward No.	Ward Name	Councilor Name	Party	Alliance
001	Maniangode	Bindu	CPI(M)	LDF
002	Puliyarmala	Ranjith R.	BJP	NDA
003	Government High School	C.K. Nisha	INC	UDF
004	Nedungode	Shabana C.	CPI(M)	LDF
005	Emily	Chithra	OTH	Others
006	Kanyagurukulam	Muhammad Rafil	CPI(M)	LDF
007	Kainatty	Jithesh V.A.	BJP	NDA
008	Civil Station	A.V. Deepa	CPI(M)	LDF
009	Goodalai	M.P. Navas	OTH	Others
010	Chathothu Vayal	Shareefa Teacher	OTH	Others
011	Municipal Office	Geetha Teacher	CPI(M)	LDF
012	Emily Thadam	Sowmya S.	CPI	LDF
013	Ambilery	K.K. Kunhammad	IUML	UDF
014	Pallithazhe	Moideen	IUML	UDF
015	Gramathu Vayal	Haritha K.	OTH	Others
016	Puthiya Bus Stand	Gireesh Kalpetta	INC	UDF
017	Pulppara	Shamir Oduvil	IUML	UDF
018	Rattakolly	Rajarani	INC	UDF
019	Puthoorvayal	Bini A.R.	CPI(M)	LDF
020	Manjalamkolly	Varghese	CPI(M)	LDF
021	Madiyoorkuni	Reena Vasudevan	CPI(M)	LDF
022	Perumthatta	Muhammad (Bava)	INC	UDF
023	Vellaramkunnu	Ravi V.C.	CPI(M)	LDF
024	Adelaide	Rajna	CPI(M)	LDF
025	Onivayal	Sashidharan Master	OTH	Others
026	Turkey	Anisha K.A.	CPI	LDF
027	Kendriya Vidyalayam	Shakira	CPI(M)	LDF
028	Edaguni	P. Vishwanathan	CPI(M)	LDF
029	Munderi	T.G. Beena	CPI(M)	LDF
030	Maravayal	Sarojini	IUML	UDF

== Demographics ==
Religions in Kalpetta Municipality
Hindus	47.73%
Muslims	38.95%
Christians	12.14%

Kalpetta municipality has a mixed population of all religions. Hindu community Is predominantly Nair and Thiyyas, Muslims are Mapillas and Christians are Syro Malabar Catholics.

== Tourist sites ==
- Pookode Lake
- Anantnath Swami Temple
- Chembra Peak
- Soochipara Falls
- 900 Kandi
- Banasura Sagar Dam

== Notable personalities ==
- Kalpatta Narayanan – Indian poet and novelist
- Abu Salim – Actor
- M. P. Veerendra Kumar – Writer and politician
- Anu Sithara – Actress
- Sunny Wayne – Actor
- Midhun Manuel Thomas – Script writer and director
- Esther Anil - Actress

== Climate ==
Climate data for Kalpetta, Kerala
Month	Jan	Feb	Mar	Apr	May	Jun	Jul	Aug	Sep	Oct	Nov	Dec	Year
Mean daily maximum °C (°F)	27.2 (81.0)	28.8 (83.8)	30.4 (86.7)	30.4 (86.7)	29.4 (84.9)	25.9 (78.6)	24.4 (75.9)	25.1 (77.2)	26.0 (78.8)	26.6 (79.9)	26.5 (79.7)	26.5 (79.7)	27.3 (81.1)
Mean daily minimum °C (°F)	16.7 (62.1)	17.9 (64.2)	19.5 (67.1)	20.8 (69.4)	20.8 (69.4)	19.7 (67.5)	19.3 (66.7)	19.4 (66.9)	19.2 (66.6)	19.4 (66.9)	18.6 (65.5)	17.0 (62.6)	19.0 (66.2)
Average precipitation mm (inches)	4 (0.2)	10 (0.4)	19 (0.7)	99 (3.9)	210 (8.3)	664 (26.1)	1,229 (48.4)	637 (25.1)	275 (10.8)	239 (9.4)	92 (3.6)	24 (0.9)	3,502 (137.8)
Source: Climate-Data.org

== See also ==
- Padinjarathara
- Chundale
- Meppadi
- Muttil, Kalpetta
- Vythiri
