= List of Malayalam horror films =

This is the chronological list of horror films produced in Malayalam cinema.

Bhargavi Nilayam, released in December 1964, is considered the first horror film in Malayalam language. The film was scripted by writer Vaikom Muhammed Basheer based on his own short story "Neelavelicham". The film, which is now considered a classic in Malayalam cinema, celebrated its Golden Jubilee in 2014.

== Films ==
Year	Title	Director	Notes	Ref.
1964	Bhargavi Nilayam	A. Vincent	Based on the short story "Neelavelicham"	
1966	Kadamattathachan	George Thariyan		
1968	Yakshi	K. S. Sethumadhavan	Adapted from the novel Yakshi	
1970	Moodalmanju	Sudin Menon		
1976	Yakshagaanam	Sheela		
1976	Vanadevatha	Yusufali Kechery		
1978	Vayanadan Thamban	A. Vincent		
1978	Lisa	Baby		
1979	Kalliyankattu Neeli	M. Krishnan Nair		
1980	Sakthi	Vijay Anand		
1981	Aarathi	P. Chandrakumar		
1981	Karimpoocha	Baby		
1984	Kadamattathachan	N.P Suresh		
1984	Manasariyathe	Soman Ambatt		
1984	Sreekrishna Parunthu	A. Vincent		
1984	Rakshassu	Hassan		
1985	Pacha Velicham	M. Mani		
1986	Viswasichalum Illenkilum	Alleppey Ashraf		
1987	Veendum Lisa	Baby	Sequel to Lisa	
1989	Adharvam	Dennis Joseph		
1989	Kalpana House	P. Chandrakumar		
1990	Brahma Rakshass	Vijayan Karote		
1990	Nidrayil Oru Rathri	Asha Khan		
1991	Agni Nilavu	N sankaran Nair		
1992	Aayushkalam	Kamal		
1993	Manichitrathazhu	Fazil		
1998	Mayilpeelikkavu	Anil Kumar		
1998	Ennu Swantham Janakikutty	Hariharan		
1999	Aakasha Ganga	Vinayan		
2000	Devadoothan	Sibi Malayil		
2000	Summer Palace	G. Murali		
2000	Indriyam	George Kithu		
2001	Megha Sandesham	Rajasenan		
2001	Bhadra	Mummy Century		
2002	Ee Bhargavi Nilayam	Benny P. Thomas		
2002	Pakalppooram	Anil Kumar		
2003	Soudamini	P. Gopikumar		
2004	Agninakshathram	Karim		
2004	Aparichithan	Sanjeev Sivan		
2004	Vellinakshatram	Vinayan		
2004	Vismayathumbathu	Fazil		
2005	Anandabhadram	Santosh Sivan		
2006	Thanthra	K. J. Bose		
2006	Moonnamathoral	V. K. Prakash	First Malayalam digital movie	
2007	Soorya Kireedam	George Kithu		
2008	Calcutta News	Blessy		
2009	Winter	Deepu Karunakaran		
2009	Kana Kanmani	Akku Akbar		
2009	Kerala Cafe	Uday Ananthan	Fourth segment in Kerala Cafe	
2009	Chemistry	Viji Thampi		
2010	Drona 2010	Shaji Kailas		
2010	In Ghost House Inn	Lal	Sequel to 2 Harihar Nagar	
2010	Yakshiyum Njanum	Vinayan		
2011	Maniac	Syed Usman		
2012	Manthrikan	Anil Kumar		
2012	Yakshi – Faithfully Yours	Abhiram Suresh Unnithan		
2013	Dracula 2012	Vinayan		
2013	Akam	Shalini Usha Nair	Adapted from the novel Yakshi	
2013	One	Parthan Mohan		
2013	Geethaanjali	Priyadarshan	Spin-off to Manichitrathazhu	
2013	Ms Lekha Tharoor Kaanunnathu	Shajiyem		
2013	Red Rain	Rahul Sadasivan		
2014	Raktharakshassu 3D	R Factor		
2014	Mithram	Jespal Shanmugham		
2015	Adi Kapyare Kootamani	John Varghese		
2016	Ghost Villa	Mahesh Keshav		
2016	Pretham	Ranjith Sankar		
2016	168 Hours	K. G. Vijayakumar		
2016	Aadupuliyattam	Kannan Thamarakkulam		
2016	Oru Murai Vanthu Parthaya	Sajan K Mathew		
2017	Ezra	Jay K		
2017	E	Kuku Surendran		
2018	Neeli	Althaf Rahman		
2018	Pretham 2	Ranjith Sankar	Sequel to 2016 film Pretham	
2018	Kinavalli	Sugeeth		
2019	Nine	Junues Muhammad		
2019	Aakasha Ganga 2	Vinayan		
2021	Krishnankutty Pani Thudangi	Sooraj Tom		
2021	The Priest	Jofin Chacko		
2021	Cold Case	Tanu Balak		
2021	Chathur Mukham	Ranjeet Kamala	First techno-horror film in Malayalam	
2021	Ghost In Bethlaham	T. S Arun Giladi		
2022	Bhoothakaalam	Rahul Sadasivan		
2022	Vazhiye	Nirmal Baby Varghese	First found footage film in Malayalam	
2023	Romancham	Jithu Madhavan		
2023	Neelavelicham	Aashiq Abu	Reboot of Bhargavi Nilayam, Based on the short story "Neelavelicham"	
2023	Dreadful Chapters	Nirmal Baby Varghese	Time-loop horror film.	
2024	Vadakkan	Sajeed. A		
2024	Bramayugam	Rahul Sadasivan		
2025	Disease X: The Zombie Experiment	Nirmal Baby Varghese	Zombie film	
2025	Dies Irae	Rahul Sadasivan		

== See also ==
- List of Malayalam films
- List of horror films
