= List of Casablanca Film Factory films =

Indian film studio

Casablanca Film Factory
- Type: Private
- Industry: Entertainment
- Founded: 2016
- Founder: Nirmal Baby Varghese
- Headquarters: Kavummannam, Wayanad, Kerala, India
- Key people: Nirmal Baby Varghese (CEO)
- Products: Films
- Divisions: Production; Distribution; Public relations

Casablanca Film Factory is an Indian film production, distribution and public relations company based in Wayanad, Kerala. It was founded by film director Nirmal Baby Varghese in 2016.

== History ==
In 2016, Nirmal Baby Varghese founded Casablanca Film Factory to produce his short films Mirror of Reality and Mattam the Change.

The company's next project was Thariode, a historical documentary about gold mining in Thariyode. The film won several awards, including the Kerala State Television Award.

The Company made their first feature debut film with Vazhiye, which is the first found footage movie in the Malayalam language. The film also marked the debut of Hollywood music director Evan Evans in Indian cinema.

== Filmography ==
Year	Title	Role	Director	Notes	Ref.
2016	Mirror of Reality	Production	Nirmal Baby Varghese	Short film Later released in 20 March 2020 on Amazon Prime Video	
2016	Mattam the Change	Production	Nirmal Baby Varghese	Short film Later released in 22 March 2020 on Amazon Prime Video	
2019	Kalippu	Public Relations	Jessen Joseph	Film features Tamil film actor Bala Singh, Kalasala Babu, Shalil Kallur and Ambika Mohan	
2021	Thariode	Production	Nirmal Baby Varghese	Documentary film Kerala State Television Award for Best Educational Programme; Now streaming on Prime Video, Plex TV, Cineverse, etc.	
2022	Vazhiye	Production	Nirmal Baby Varghese	First found footage film in Malayalam cinema Direct Release on OTT via Prime Video, and Tubi	
2024	CID Ramachandran Retd. SI	Public Relations	Sanoop Sathyan	The film stars Kalabhavan Shajohn,Anumol, Baiju Santhosh, Sudheer Karamana and Shanker Ramakrishnan.	
2024	Abhirami	Public Relations	Mushthaque Rahman Kariyaden	Film stars Gayathri Suresh, Roshan Basheer and Harikrishnan	
2024	Kunddala Puranam	Public Relations	Santhosh Puthukkunnu	Film stars Indrans and Remya Suresh	
2024	Dreadful Chapters	Production	Nirmal Baby Varghese	Time loop horror film	
2024	Acid	Distribution	Gokul K	Malayalam crime thriller film	
2025	Moppala	Distribution	Santhosh Puthukkunnu	Film stars Santhosh Keezhattoor	
2025	Anthima Kshanagalu	Production	Nirmal Baby Varghese	Kannada film Now streaming on BookMyShow Stream	
2025	Alien Genesis: Beyond the Stars	Production	Nirmal Baby Varghese	Indian English-language film Documentary on Alien abduction	
2025	Obbattu	Distribution	Lokesh Vidyadhara	Kannada comedy film streaming on Amazon Prime Video	
2025	Appa I Love You	Distribution	Athrav Arya	Kannada film Film stars Prem,Tabla Nani, Manvitha Kamath,Bala Rajwadi, Vijay Chendoor and Aruna Balraj.	
2026	Nimbiya Banada Myaga Page 1	Distribution	Ashok Kadaba	The film marks the debut of Shanmukha Govindraj, the grandson of Dr. Rajkumar; Also stars Padma Vasanthi and Sundeep Malani	
2026	Rajadrohi	Distribution	Samarth Raj	Kannada film Film stars Anant Nag, Sharan, Lakshmi, Avinash Yelandur, Vijay Chendoor and Aruna Balraj.	
2026	Vikipedia	Distribution	Somu Hoysala	Kannada film	
2026	Iravin Vizhigal	Distribution	Sikkal Rajesh	Tamil film Film stars Nizhalgal Ravi, Scissor Manohar and Sikkal Rajesh.	
2026	Nenapugala Maatu Madhura	Distribution	Mohamed Abzal	Kannada romantic film	
2026	Athyuttama	Distribution	Shivakumar B. Jevaragi	Kannada film	
2026	Night of the Living Dead	Distribution	George A. Romero	American film Color restored version	
2026	Surya: The Power of Love	Distribution	Sagar Dass	Kannada film Film stars Prashantha Surya, P. Ravi Shankar, Shruti.	
2026	Thadai Athai Udai	Distribution	Arivazhakan Murugesan	Tamil film Film stars Mahesh.	
2026	Yadbhavam Tadbhavathi	Distribution	Ammith Rao	Kannada film	
2026	Tholaivil Oru Kadhal	Distribution	Vijayanand Kandasamy	Tamil romantic film	
2026	The Last Man on Earth	Distribution	Sidney Salkow	American film Color restored version	
2026	Yolo	Distribution	S. Sam	Tamil comedy film Starring Dev, Badava Gopi, and Giri Dwarakish	
2026	Daiva	Distribution	Manjunath Jayaraaj	Kannada action film	
2026	Mylanji	Distribution	Ajayan Bala	Tamil film Film stars Sriram Karthick, Krisha Kurup, Singampuli, Munishkanth, Thangadurai; Music composed by Ilayaraja	
2026	Envazhi Thanivazhi	Distribution	P Jerin	Malayalam film now straming on Hungama Play	
2026	Namma Bharatha	Distribution	Kumara Swamy	Kannada Patriotic film	
2026	Ambassador	Distribution	Ashok Kumar C V	Kannada action film streaming now on Prime Video	
2026	Aa Ondu Notu	Distribution	Ratnatanay	Kannada drama film starring Bala Rajwadi	
2026	Ugravathara	Distribution	Guru Murthy	Kannada action film Film stars Priyanka Upendra, Suman, Ajay and Pavitra Lokesh	
2026	Promise	Distribution	Arunkumar Sekaran	Tamil romantic film Film stars Arunkumar Sekaran, Nathiya Somu and Sujan Christopher	
2026	Ashantham	Distribution	R J Prasad	Malayalam language family-drama Film stars Rejith V Chand, Raina Roy and Santhakumari	
2026	Disease X: The Zombie Experiment	Production	Nirmal Baby Varghese	Zombie film Indian debut of Australian actor Roger Ward	
