= K. K. N. Kurup =

Indian historian

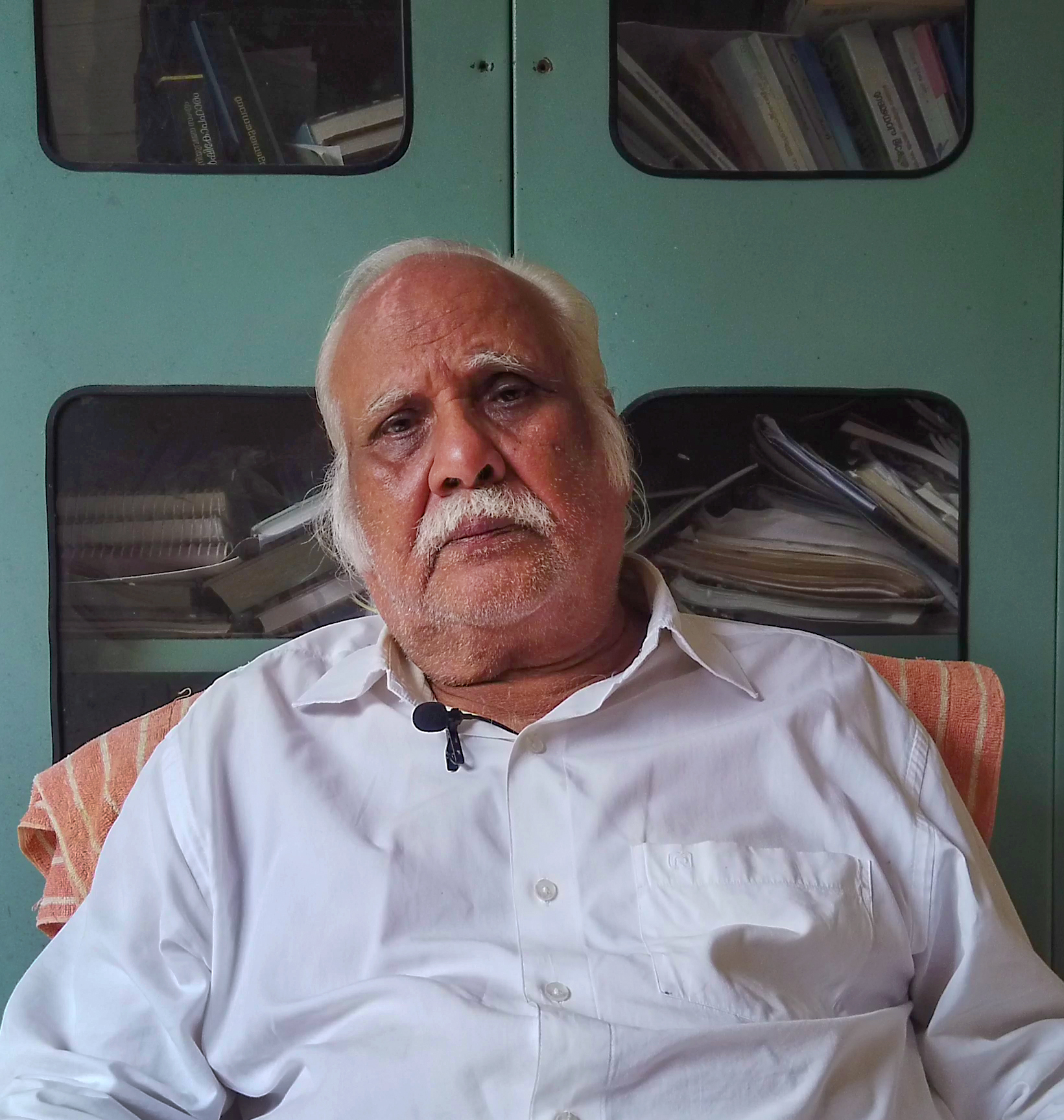
- K. K. N. Kurup gives interview for the documentary film "Thariode", Kozhikode, (July 2019)
- Born: 13 February 1939 (age 87); Azhiyur, Kozhikode, Kerala
- Education: University of Delhi (B.A.), University of Calicut (M.A. and Ph.D.)
- Occupations: Historian vice-chancellor of the University of Calicut
- Notable work: Pazhassi Samarangal (1981); History of the Tellicherry Factory, 1683-1794. Sandhya Publications (1985)

K. K. N. Kurup (born 1939) is an historian of India and a former vice-chancellor of the University of Calicut. He has specialised in the history of the Malabar region of South India.

== Education ==
Kurup obtained a B.A. from the University of Delhi and then studied for his M.A. and PhD at the University of Calicut. He was awarded the latter in 1976.

== Teaching ==
He had been teaching at Calicut since 1972 and continued in various positions there. In 1983, he was a professor and the head of the history department at the University of Mangalore and was also awarded a professorship at Calicut. He was appointed head of the history department in Calicut in 1991 and in June 1998 became vice-chancellor, at a time when the university was suffering from a decline in staff due to numerous retirements. During his period of office, the fortunes of the institution were revived, its student numbers increased, a new engineering college facility was introduced and tertiary facilities were established in Thrissur, Wayanad and Vatakara. The tertiary bodies were all situated in relatively remote areas and formed part of his "Knowledge for Villages" vision.

The Malabar Institute of Research and Development is another Kurup innovation, begun at Vatakara in 2002 while he was still vice-chancellor. He was able to devote more time to it after his term of office came to an end in June of that year and now describes it as

an organisation of scholars and ordinary citizens who work to embolden the masses through creative and scholarly interventions. MIRD conducts seminars, discussions and debates often in social science. We believe a social scientist is a social engineer and the best way for him to work is through effective arguments. MIRD provides a platform for that.

Kurup is a senior research fellow of the Indian Council of Historical Research. He specialises in agrarian relations, colonial history and folklore, especially in the region of Kerala, which used to be a part of Malabar. He was general president of the 1991 South Indian History Congress at Dharwad and president of the Modern Session at the Indian History Congress held in Mysore in 1993. Among his numerous other offices has been that of director-general of the Centre for Heritage Studies operated by the Government of Kerala.

== Awards ==
Various awards have been made to Kurup, including the 2010 T. K. Ramakrishnan Prize awarded by Abu Dhabi Sakthi Theatres, and the 1981 K. Damodaran award for the best work in Malayalam on a social science topic and Annahda national excellence award in 2019. Kozhikode based NGO Centre for Information and Guidance India (CIGI) awarded Dr. K.K.N Kurup with Dr. K.M Aboobacker CIGI Education Award for his contributions to academia and society through meaningful actions in 2025.

== Works ==
Kurup has published numerous works in both English and Malayalam. These encompass research papers and books, of which the latter include:

- The Cult of Teyyam and Hero Worship in Kerala. Indian Publications. 1973.
- Aspects of Kerala History and Culture. 1976.
- William Logan: A Study in the Agrarian Relations of Malabar. Sandhya Publications. 1981.
- Pazhassi Samarangal. 1981.
- Modern Kerala: Research Papers in History. Kerala Bhasha Institute. 1982.
- History of the Tellicherry Factory, 1683-1794. Sandhya Publications. 1985.
- Modern Kerala: Studies in Social and Agrarian Relations. Mittal Publications. 1988. ISBN 9788170990949.
- Agrarian Struggle in Kerala. 1989.
- Peasantry, Nationalism, and Social Change in India. Chugh Publications. 1991.
- India's Naval Traditions: The Role of Kunhali Marakkars. Northern Book Centre. 1997. ISBN 9788172110833. (editor)
- Nationalism, Social Change: the Role of Malayalam Literature. 1999.
- Kurup, K. K. N. (2000). Land Monopoly & Agrarian System in South Kanara with special reference to Kasargod Taluk. Publication Division, University of Calicut. ISBN 81-7748-006-5.
- Kurup, K. K. N. (2002) [1975]. The Ali Rajas of Cannanore. Publication Division, University of Calicut. ISBN 81-7748-031-6.

== Documentary appearances ==
Year(s)	Title	Director	Ref(s)
TBA	Thariode	Nirmal Baby Varghese	
