= C. R. Rajagopalan =

Indian folklore researcher (c.1957–2022)

- Born: c. 1957; Perumpullissery, Thrissur District, Kerala, India
- Died: 31 January 2022 (aged 64); Thrissur, Kerala, India
- Occupation(s): folklore researcher, writer
- Spouse: Sheetal V. S.
- Parent(s): Rama Panicker; Narayani Amma
- Awards: Kerala Folklore Academy Award; Kerala Sangeetha Nataka Akademi Award

C. R. Rajagopalan (c. 1957 – 31 January 2022) was an Indian writer, teacher and environmental activist from Kerala. Rajagopalan worked for the monitoring and preservation of folklore and tribal culture. He has written several books on heritage and folklore studies. He received awards from Kerala Folklore Academy and Kerala Sangeetha Nataka Akademi.

== Biography ==
Rajagopalan was born to Rama Panicker and Narayani Amma in Perumpullissery in Thrissur District of Kerala. He studied at C. N. N. High School, Thrissur Government College and Sri Kerala Varma College. He did his PhD in theatrical aspects of masks used in Theyyam, Kummatti, Thirapputnam, Krishnanattam and their relevance in modern theatre practices, from the Calicut University. He served as an associate professor at Kerala Varma College, Thrissur and Dean at the University of Kerala. He has received the Junior Fellowship from the Union Ministry of Culture, Government of India, and did Project on the Ethnic Music and UGC's Major Project on National Aesthetics of Folk Theater. Rajagopalan has also served as the Director of the Nattarivu Padana Kendram, a center for folklore studies in Thrissur, and director of the International Centre for Kerala Studies (ICKS) of Kerala University Kariavattom campus.

He authored several books on folklore, directed albums of folk songs and documentaries on folklore and has presented papers in Greece, China, Poland, Italy, England, Switzerland, Rome, Geneva and Oxford. He has also been the General Editor of DC Books' Nattarivukal, a series of 20 books on Folk knowledge, and the editor of Krishi Geetha. He attended the Geneva-based World Intellectual Property Organization's Heritage Knowledge Meeting. He was a regular contributor to periodicals on folklore.

Rajagopalan was actively involved in various movements against environmental pollution and was a serious supporter of environmental protection, alternative politics and lifestyle. His support was instrumental in the publication of the Malayalam translation of the book One Straw Revolution by the Japanese farmer and philosopher Masanobu Fukuoka.

=== Personal life and death ===
He was married to Sheetal V. S. He died from COVID-19 on 31 January 2022, aged 64. In a condolence note, Kerala state Higher Education and Social Justice Minister R. Bindu said that the late Rajagopalan was synonymous with folklore studies.

== Works ==
His selected books on heritage and folklore studies include Ellam Kathiyeriyukayaanu, Alayunnavar, Mudiyettu, Nadodi Nattarang, Folklore Sidhanthangal, Kaavettam, Nadan Kalaroopangal, Karuthanikalude Koyth, Gothra Kalavadivukal, Desheeya Saundaryabodham, Thanneerppanthal, Njattuvelakk Pottukuthenda, Krishi Geethayum Bhakshya Surakshayum, Puzhayude Nattarivukal, Annavum Samskaravum, Varikkaplavinuvendi Oru Vadakkanpaattu, AAttakkolangal, Keraleeya Ramga Kala Charithram, Mannu, Lavanyam, Prathiridham, Naattunaav Mozhi, Malayalathinte Kathoram, Kannadi Nokkumpol, Diasphora, Erumadangal and Nattariv, 2000 years of Malayali Heritage.

=== As editor ===
Out of the 20 books in the DC Books' Nattarivukal series, he edited the books Kaattarivukal (book on forest knowledge), Naattu Bhakshanam (book on local foods) Naattu Vaidyam (book on traditional medicine), Naattu Sangeetham (book on traditional music), Sasyangalude Nattariv (Information on local plant species), Kadalarivukal (book on sea informations), Krish Nattarivukal (book on traditional farming knowledge), Nadodi Kaivela (book on folk hand works), Pookkalum Pakshikalum (book on flowers and birds), Janthukkalum Nattarivukalum (book on local animals), Neerarivukal (book on knowledge of water) and Puzhayude Naattarivukal (book on local knowledge about rivers).

He also edited the books Summer Rain, Harvesting the indigenous knowledge of Kerala, Pillerthalam, Naattarivinte Ninav, Uppum Chorum Naattucharithram, Piravi and Vayalkkalakal.

== Awards and honors ==
- Kerala Folklore Academy Award 2002
- Kerala Sangeetha Nataka Akademi Award
- Lifetime Achievement Award in International Folklore Film Festival
