= Midhun Eravil =

Indian cinematographer

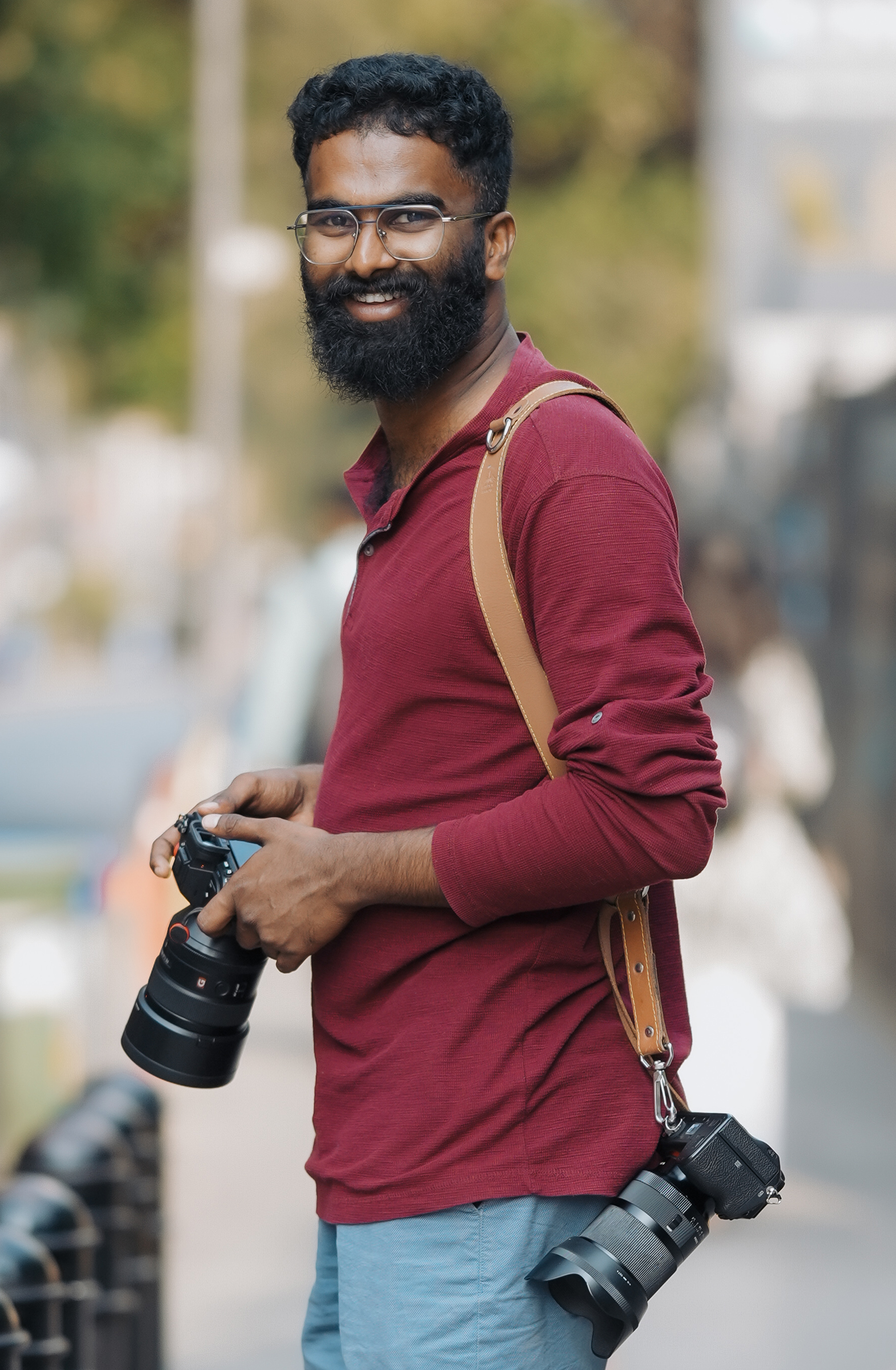
- Born: Kasaragod, Kerala, India
- Occupation: Cinematographer
- Years active: 2021–present

Midhun Eravil is an Indian cinematographer who works predominantly in the Malayalam cinema industry.

== Film career ==
The Kasaragod native made his debut with the 2021 documentary film Thariode directed by Nirmal Baby Varghese about the gold mining history of Thariyode. The film found critical acclaim in the festival circuit. He made his feature film debut in the 2022 film Vazhiye which is the first found footage movie in the Malayalam language.

== Filmography ==
Year	Film	Notes	Ref(s)
2021	Thariode	documentary film	
2022	Vazhiye	First found footage film in Malayalam	
2022	Keni	Produced by National Institute of Advanced Studies	
2024	Dreadful Chapters	Directed by Nirmal Baby Varghese	
2025	Anthima Kshanagalu	Kannada film Streaming on BookMyShow Stream	
2026	Disease X: The Zombie Experiment	Zombie film starring Roger Ward	

== Awards ==
Year	Award	Category	Work	Result	Ref(s)
2022	Indie World Film Festival	Best Cinematographer	Vazhiye	Won	
2024	Reels International Film Festival	Best Cinematographer	Dreadful Chapters	Won	
