= Vazhiye =

2022 Malayalam-language found footage film

- First look poster
- Directed by: Nirmal Baby Varghese
- Written by: Nirmal Baby Varghese
- Produced by: Baby Chaithanya
- Cinematography: Midhun Eravil
- Edited by: Nirmal Baby Varghese
- Music by: Evan Evans
- Production company: Casablanca Film Factory
- Release date: 11 June 2022
- Running time: 80 minutes
- Country: India
- Language: Malayalam

Vazhiye (transl. The Trail) is a 2022 Indian Malayalam-language found footage horror film written and directed by Nirmal Baby Varghese after Thariode. This movie is an experimental movie made in found footage style and it is the first found footage movie in Malayalam. Produced by Baby Chaithanya under the banner of Casablanca Film Factory. The film marked the debut of Hollywood music director Evan Evans in Indian cinema.

== Premise ==
The film narrates the story of two YouTube vloggers that decide to make a documentary film about a mystery land, where they confront perilous, nightmarish situations.

== Cast ==
- Jeffin Joseph
- Aswathi Anil Kumar
- Varun Ravindran
- Shyam Salash
- Shalini Baby
- Joji Tomy
- Saniya Poulose
- Rajan

== Production ==
=== Development ===
On 4 March 2019, The New Indian Express reported that Nirmal was working on his next project titled Vazhiye, a found-footage horror film. Nirmal announced Vazhiye on his facebook on 31 August 2020. The film is produced by Baby Chaithanya under the banner of Casablanca Film Factory in association with Vivid Frames. American Evan Evans was signed as the composer.

=== Filming ===
Principal photography began on 28 September 2020 with a customary pooja function held at Chittarikkal, Kasaragod. Other primary filming locations were in Badoor, Pulingome, Cherupuzha, Kanamvayal and around the Kasaragod-Karnataka border. Shooting was wrapped on 20 October 2020 at Konnakkad.

== Soundtrack ==
The original background score and theme music is composed by American film score composer Evan Evans.

== Release ==
The film screened at the Toronto Indie Horror Film Fest in May 2022.

=== Home media ===
Film started streaming on the American OTT platform Diverse Cinema from 11 June 2022. Also available for streaming on Amazon Prime Video from 12 August 2022.

== Awards and accolades ==
=== Awards ===
Year	Awards	Category	Result	Ref(s)
2022	Festivus Film Festival	Best Feature Film	Runner-up	
2022	Roshani International Film Festival	Best Director of Experimental Film	Won	

=== Film festival official selections ===
Year	Film Festival	Ref(s)
2022	Toronto Indie Horror Fest	

== Vazhiye Indie Film Fest ==
In 2024, team Vazhiye started Vazhiye Indie Film Fest, which showcases independent movies and support independent filmmakers from around the world.

== Kannada version ==
A Kannada-language version of the film, titled Anthima Kshanagalu, was released in 2025 on BookMyShow Stream. This version retained the original visuals of Vazhiye but was re-edited with Kannada dubbing, localized title cards, and minor post-production changes.

== See also ==
- Found footage (film technique)
- List of found footage films
- List of ghost films
- List of Malayalam horror films
