= Baby Chaithanya =

Indian film producer

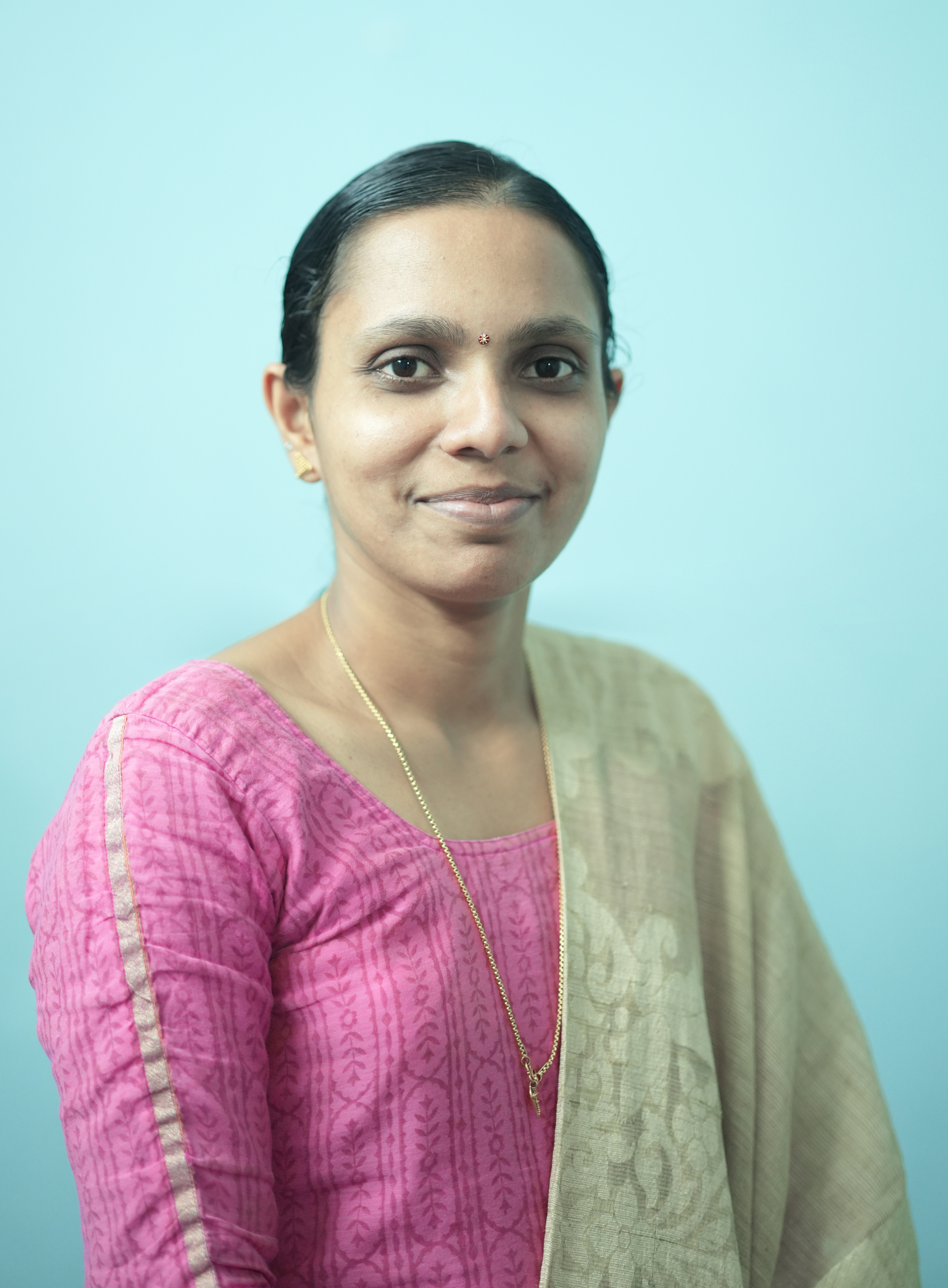
- Chaithanya in September 2024.
- Born: Wayanad, Kerala, India
- Occupation: Film producer
- Years active: 2021–present

Baby Chaithanya is an Indian film producer who works in the Malayalam cinema.

== Film career ==
She made her debut with the 2021 documentary film Thariode directed by Nirmal Baby Varghese about the gold mining history of Thariyode. The film found critical acclaim in the festival circuit. She made her feature film debut in the 2022 film Vazhiye which is the first found footage movie in the Malayalam language. The film marked the debut of Hollywood music director Evan Evans in Indian cinema. After Vazhiye, she produced Dreadful Chapters, a time loop horror thriller film released in September 2024.

== Filmography ==
Year	Film	Notes	Ref(s)
2021	Thariode	Historical documentary film Kerala State Television Award winner	
2022	Vazhiye	Malayalam's first found footage film	
2024	Dreadful Chapters	Time loop horror film	
2025	Alien Genesis: Beyond the Stars	English documentary film Streaming on Plex	
2025	Anthima Kshanagalu	Kannada film Streaming on BookMyShow Stream	
TBA	Disease X: The Zombie Experiment	Zombie film starring Roger Ward	

== Awards ==
Year	Award	Category	Work	Result	Ref(s)
2021	Kerala State Television Award	Best Educational Programme	Thariode	Won	
