= Kalliat Valsaraj =

Chemical engineer, academic and author

Kalliat T Valsaraj
- Occupations: Chemical engineer, academic and author

Academic background
- Education: BSc, Chemistry; MSc, Chemistry; PhD, Chemistry
- Alma mater: University of Calicut; IIT Madras; Vanderbilt University

Kalliat T Valsaraj is a chemical engineer professor.

Among his authored works are his publications in academic journals, including Environmental Science & Technology and Journal of Chemical & Engineering Data as well as books such as Elements of Environmental Engineering: Thermodynamics and Kinetics. Moreover, he is the recipient of 2012 Charles E Coates Award, which was jointly awarded by American Institute of Chemical Engineers and the American Chemical Society.

== Works ==
In one of his books titled Elements of Environmental Engineering: Thermodynamics and Kinetics, he explored the applications of chemical thermodynamics and kinetics in environmental engineering, providing a multidisciplinary perspective on the theoretical foundations, limitations, and practical aspects involved in fate and transport modeling, pollution control design, and waste treatment processes. In another book titled Atmospheric Aerosols: Characterization, Chemistry, Modeling, and Climate, he explored the multifaceted aspects of atmospheric aerosols, covering their physical characterization, chemistry, and modeling, with specific chapters addressing morphology, chemical reactivity, radiative effects, and environmental impacts post-Hurricane Katrina.

Valsaraj holds three patents, including developing a remediation method for dense nonaqueous-phase liquid contaminants in the Earth's subsurface.

== Awards and honors ==
- 1997 – Cross-Holloway Award of Excellence in Research and Service, Louisiana State University
- 2008 – Fellow, American Institute of Chemical Engineers
- 2009 – Rotary International Vocational Excellence Award, Rotary Club of Kannur North
- 2009 – Fellow, American Association for the Advancement of Science
- 2010 – LSU Rainmaker Senior Scholar Award (STEM Category) for Research and Creativity, Louisiana State University
- 2012 – Charles E Coates Award, American Institute of Chemical Engineers and the American Chemical Society professional chapters
- 2015 – Fellow, National Academy of Inventors
- 2019 – Fellow, Royal Society of Chemistry

== Bibliography ==
=== Books ===
- Elements of Environmental Engineering: Thermodynamics and Kinetics (2000) ISBN 9781566703970
- Atmospheric Aerosols: Characterization, Chemistry, Modeling, and Climate (2009) ISBN 9780841269736
- Photocatalytic Reaction with Inverse Opal Catalyst: A method to solve air pollution via photocatalyst (2010) ISBN 9783843378543
