= University of Calicut =

State university in Kerala, India

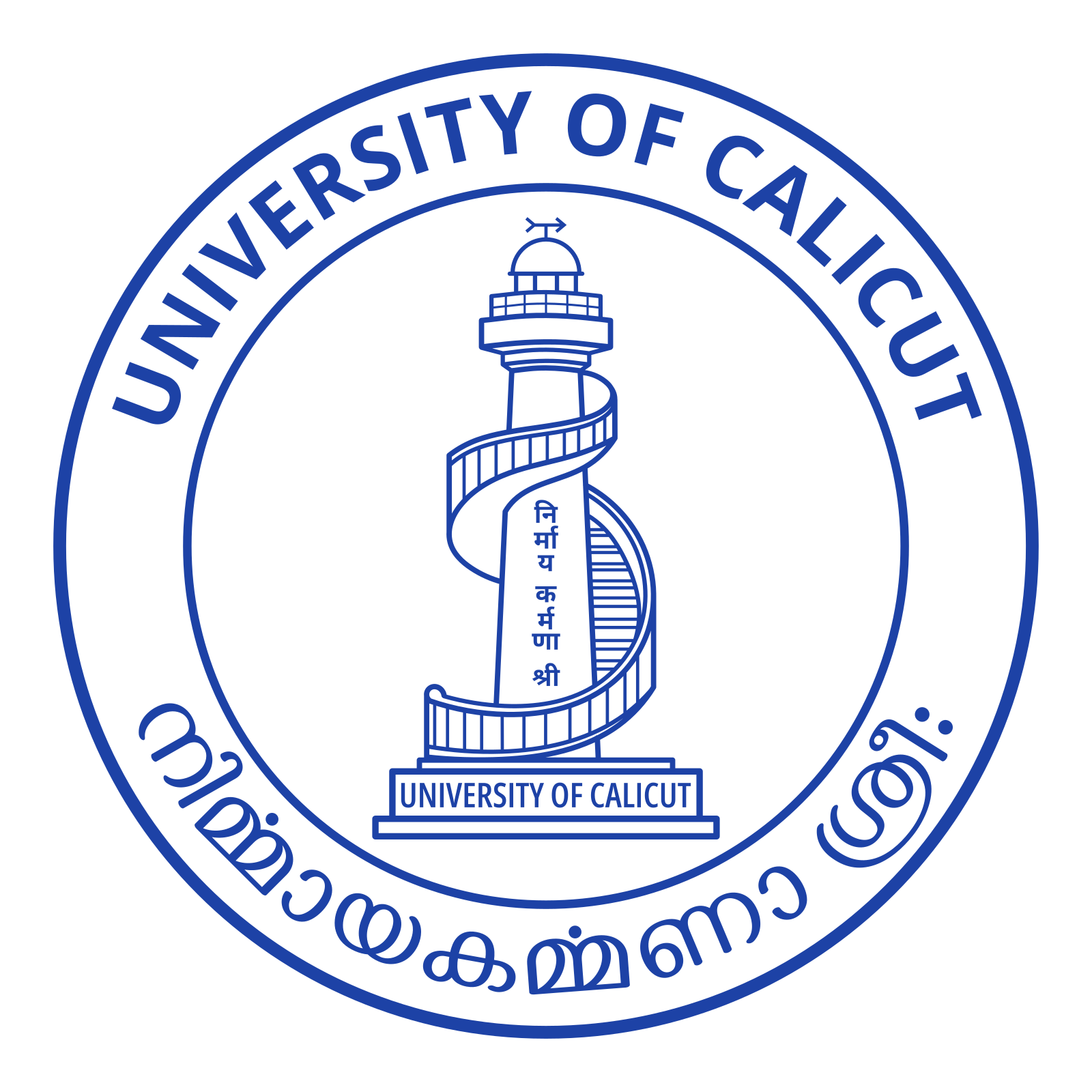
- Seal of the University of Calicut
- Other name: Calicut University
- Motto: Nirmāya Karmana Sri
- Motto in English: "Prosperity will be Produced by Pure Action"
- Type: Public
- Established: 1968; 58 years ago
- Accreditation: NAAC
- Affiliations: UGC, NAAC, AIU, ACU
- Budget: ₹4,155,323,172 (US$43 million) (2018–19)
- Chancellor: Governor of Kerala
- Vice-Chancellor: Dr. P. Raveendran
- Undergraduates: 301 (NIRF-2020)
- Postgraduates: 1799 (NIRF-2020)
- Doctoral students: 581 (full-time) (NIRF-2020)
- Location: Tenhipalam, Kerala, 673635, India
- Language: Malayalam
- Website: uoc.ac.in

University of Calicut is a state-run public university headquartered at Tenhipalam in Malappuram district of the state of Kerala, India. Established in 1968, it is the first university to be set up in northern Kerala. The university is coordinated by the University Grants Commission (re-accredited by NAAC with 'A+' grade).

Calicut University, created by bifurcating Kerala University, is the second university to be set up in Kerala. M. M. Gani, 1969–75, was the first vice-chancellor of the university. Its primary catchment area is the northern districts of Kerala. Calicut University has nine schools and 34 departments. As of 2018–19, Calicut University had 301 undergraduate students and 1,799 post-graduate students. The number of full-time doctoral students was 581.

Calicut University manages around 400 independent affiliated colleges spread across northern Kerala. It also conducts examinations for the students of the affiliated colleges. It is also the largest 'affiliating' university in Kerala.

== History ==
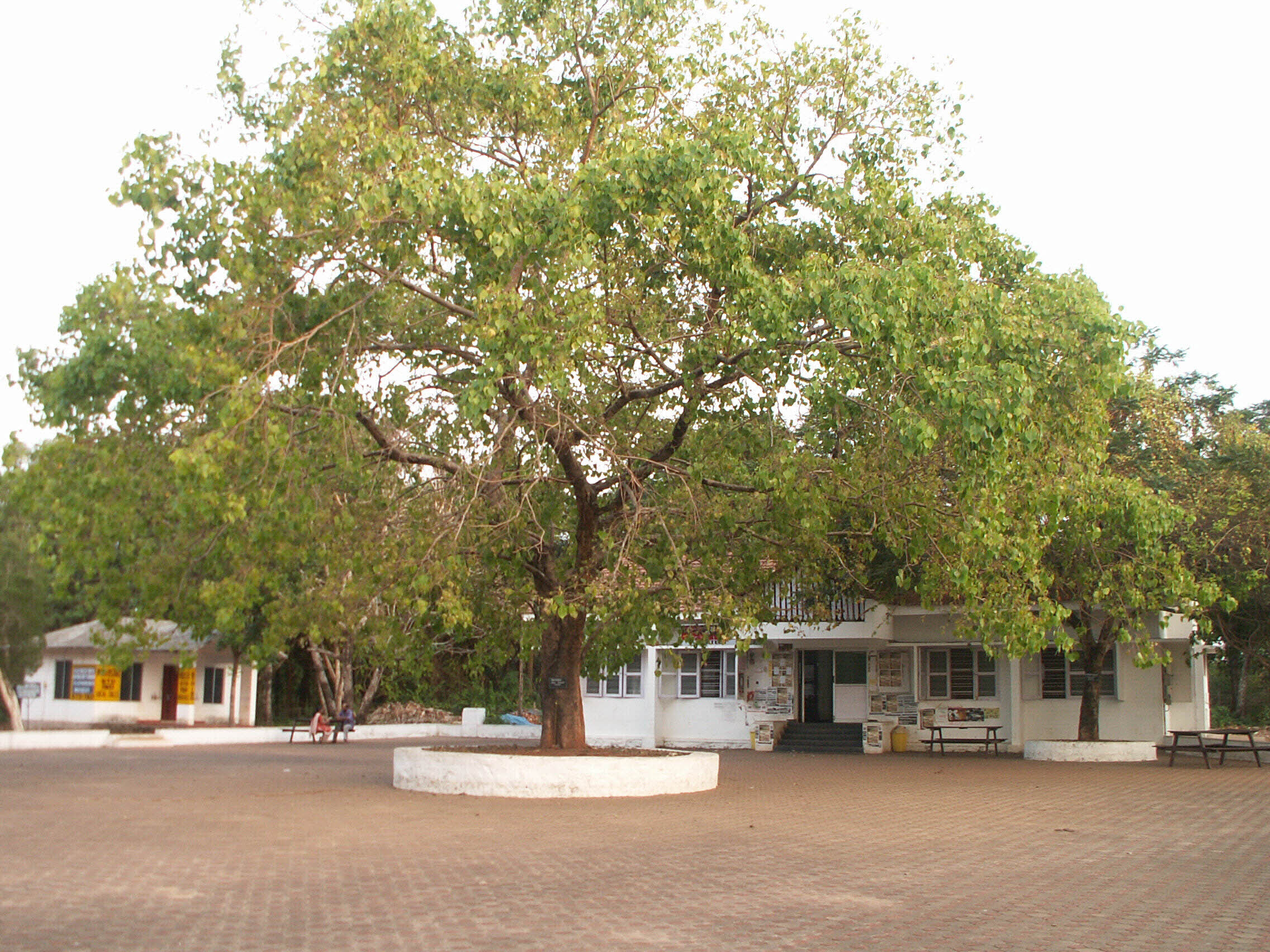
The University Cafeteria

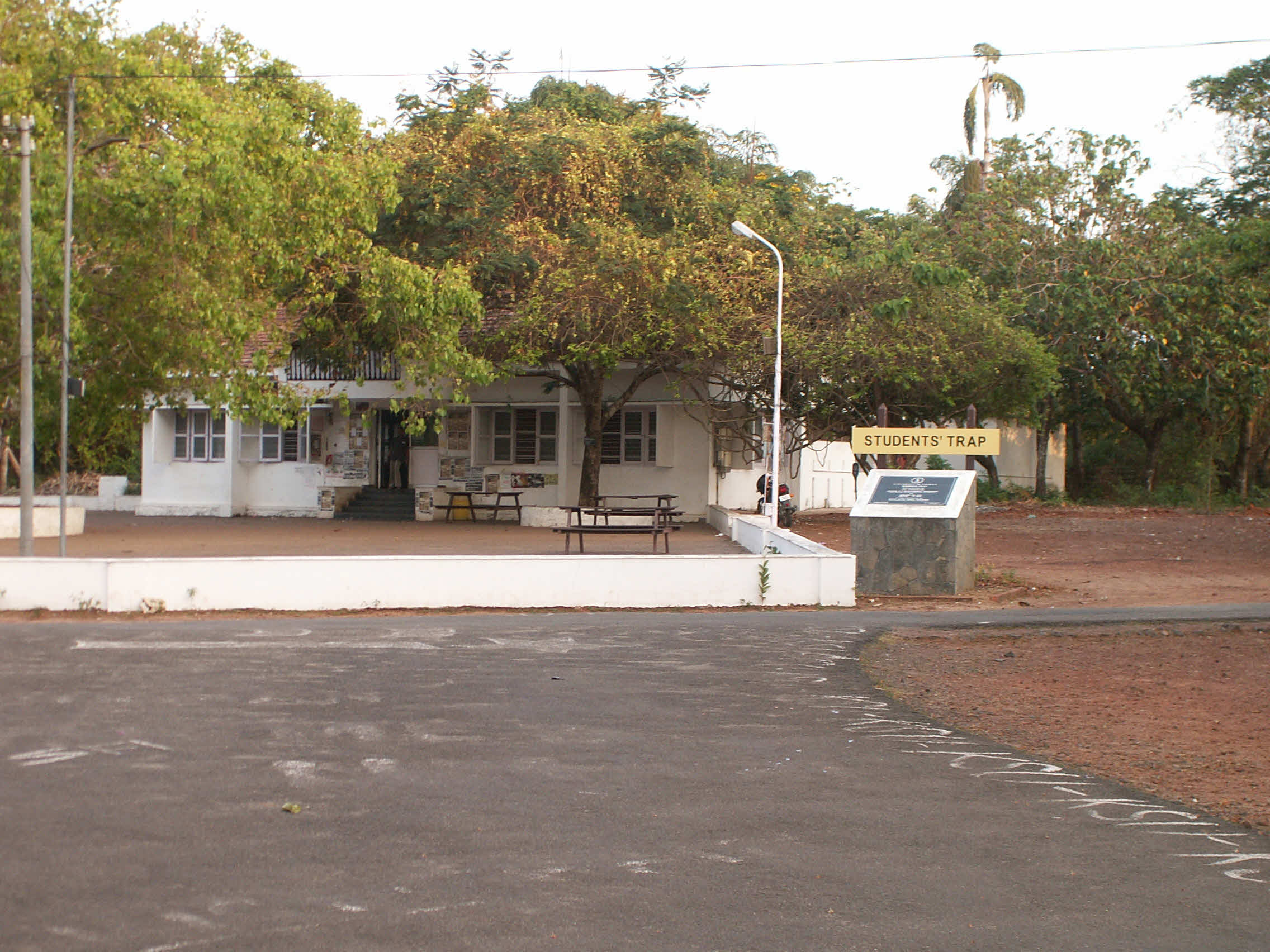
The 'Student Trap'

The university came into being as a result of the efforts of the leaders of communist party with the encouragement of the then Kerala Chief Minister, E.M.S. Namboodiripad. C. H. Mohammed Koya the then Kerala Education Minister constituted a twenty-two member committee of experts to make a pilot study on establishing new universities in the State. The twenty-two member committee in its report unanimously recommended the immediate establishment of a university in Calicut to organize post-graduate departments of studies and research and to affiliate colleges in the northern districts.

Thus came into being the University of Calicut. K. C. Chacko, special officer, was appointed the first pro-vice-chancellor of the university; the university was formally inaugurated at a public function on 12 August 1968, the Calicut University Bill was passed by the State Legislative Assembly on 29 August 1968; and statutory bodies such as the Senate, Syndicate, Academic Council, Faculties and Boards of Studies were constituted.

The university was established through a Kerala government plan bifurcating the Kerala University. As per the plan, the four post-graduate departments of the Kerala University operating in Calicut were annexed to the new university.

== Campus ==
The main university campus is located at Tenhipalam, 24 km (15 mi) south of the city of Calicut and about 30 km (19 mi) from city of Malappuram. Most of the teaching and research departments, the Office of the Vice-Chancellor, and the Administration Block are situated on the main campus. The university also has two off-campus centers, one at Thrissur and the other, specially meant for tribal empowerment, located in the Western Ghats area of the state, Wayanad. Besides these, there are self-financing centers located in different parts of the area of jurisdiction.

=== Central facilities ===
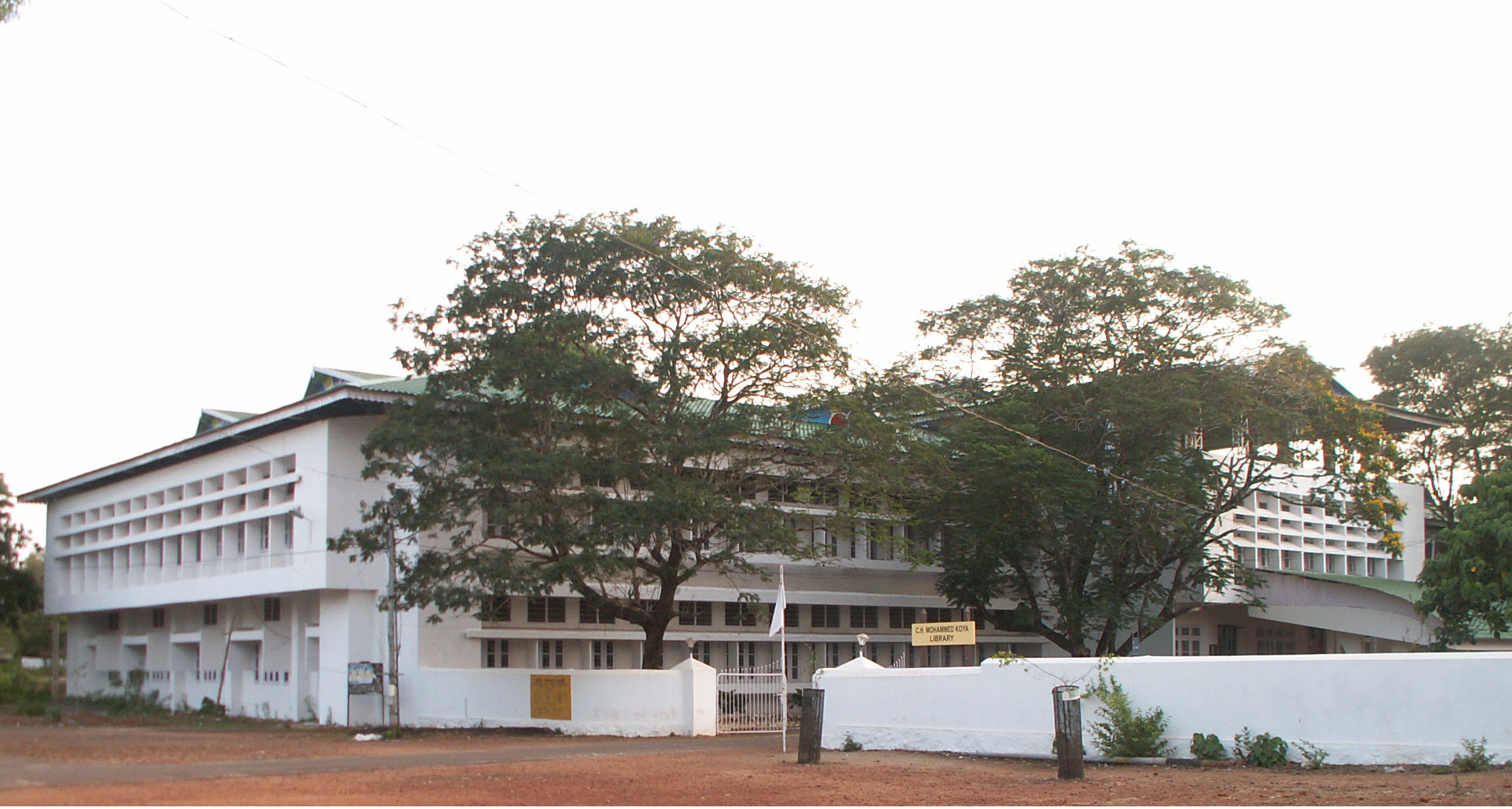
Central Library (CHMK Library), University of Calicut

The following are the central facilities in the University of Calicut.

- Pareeksha Bhavan
- Calicut University Computer Center
- CHMK Library
- Botanical Garden
- Thaliyola
- Madhava Observatory
- Central Sophisticated Instrumentation Facility
- University Museum
- University Park
- University Science Instrumentation Center

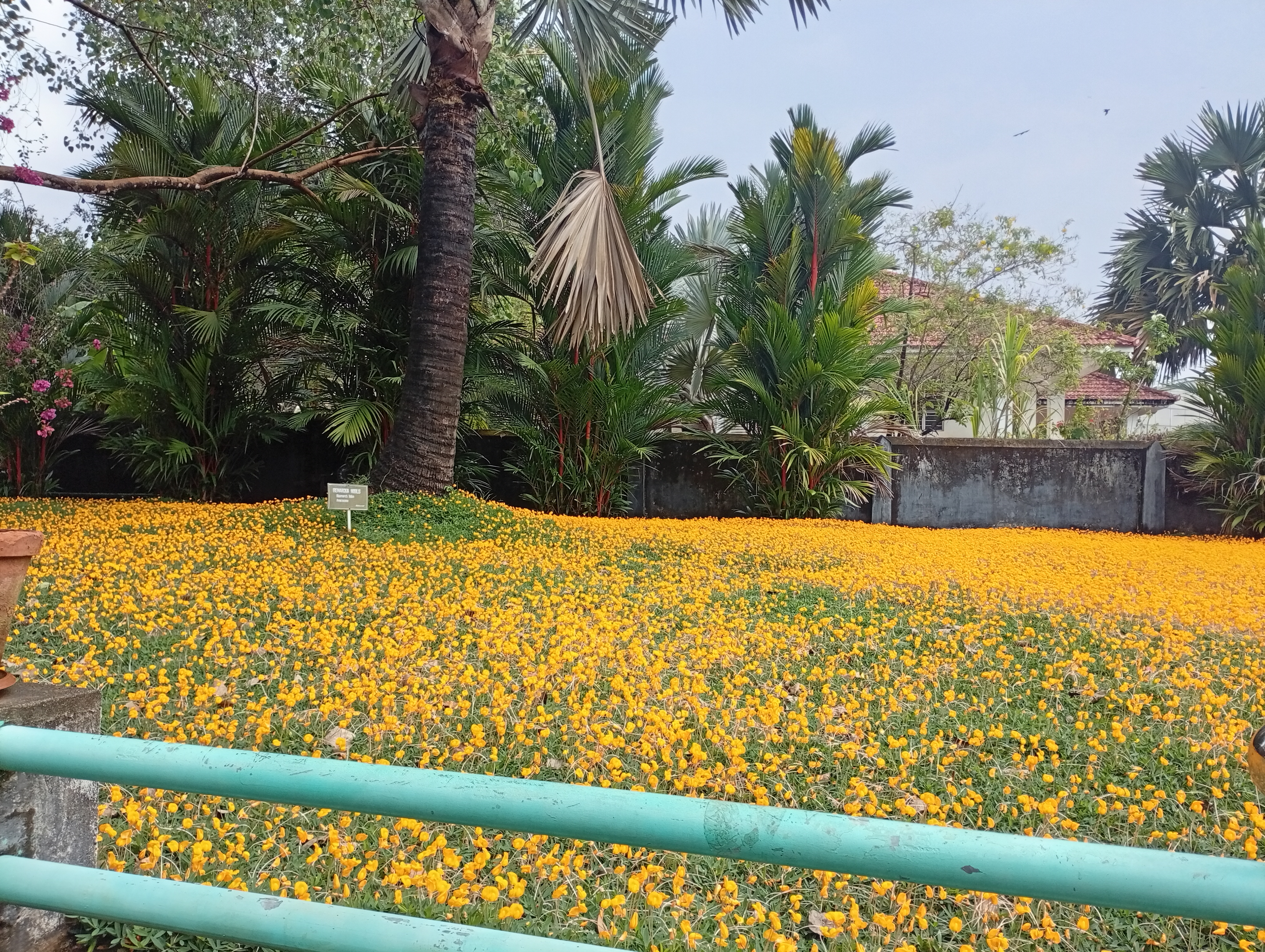
Flower bed across the University General Library

=== CHMK Library ===
- Calicut University Library was established in 1971.
- The library was renamed after C.H. Mohammed Koya (former chief Minister, Government of Kerala).
- It has a collection of about 95,000 books and subscribes to 218 journals and 10 newspapers.
- The library follows the Anglo American Cataloguing Rules II (with slight modifications) for cataloguing and the Dewey Decimal Scheme of Classification for the classification of books.

== Organisation and administration ==
=== Governance ===
A Vice-chancellor is the head of the university. Dr. P. Raveendran is the current Vice-Chancellor of the University of Calicut.

- The Senate - consists of 16 members including the Chancellor (Governor of Kerala), the Pro-Chancellor (Kerala Minister of Higher Education), the Vice-Chancellor and Pro Vice-Chancellor.
- The Syndicate - consists of 6 members including the Vice-Chancellor, Pro Vice-Chancellor, Higher Education Secretary, Director of Public Instruction and Director of Collegiate Education.
- The Academic Council - the supreme academic body of the university.
- The Faculties
- The Boards of Studies Boards of Studies - the basic design of the curricula is done by the Boards of Studies.
- The Students' Council - consists of 22 elected members from various independent affiliated colleges and university departments and six members including the Vice-Chancellor.
- The Finance committee - consists of the Vice-Chancellor, Pro Vice-Chancellor, representatives of the Senate, the Syndicate and the Academic Council, the Finance Secretary to Government or an Officer not below the rank of a Joint Secretary nominated by him and the Higher Education Secretary to Government.

=== Endowment ===
From the 2019 Annual Report

	Sources	Expenditures
I: Non-Plan Funds	Kerala State Non-Plan Grant; Self generated income from examination, academic and other departments	Salaries and pensions; Conduct of examinations; Other recurring administrative and departmental expenses
II: Plan Funds	Grant from UGC; Kerala State Plan Grant; Receipts from the self financing courses/centers	Plan funds received from the Government of Kerala and the UGC are used only for the specific purposes for which they are sanctioned
II: Plan Funds	Grant from UGC; Kerala State Plan Grant; Receipts from the self financing courses/centers	A: UGC assisted plan expenditure
II: Plan Funds	Grant from UGC; Kerala State Plan Grant; Receipts from the self financing courses/centers	B: Kerala State assisted plan expenditure
II: Plan Funds	Grant from UGC; Kerala State Plan Grant; Receipts from the self financing courses/centers	C: Expenditure related to self financing courses/centers.
III: Earmarked Funds	Various funding agencies towards fellowships, scholarships and research projects.	Used only for the specific purposes for which they are intended
IV	Debts, deposits and advances	

- Kerala State Non-Plan Grant (for 2018/19) - Rs. 20,814.88 lakhs
- Income from internal sources - Rs. 12,875.13 lakhs
- Kerala State Plan Grant (for 2018/19) - Rs. 2,500.00 lakhs
- Grant from UGC under XIIth Plan - Rs. 436.40 lakhs

Salaries and pension alone contribute to 63.03% of the total expenditure.

- Salary - Rs. 14,541.12 lakhs
- Pension & DCRG - Rs. 8,151.50 lakhs
- Development & Modernisation - Rs. 3,146.32 lakhs
- Conduct of Exam - Rs. 2,105.00 lakhs
- Scholarships/Research Projects - Rs. 761.81 lakhs

=== Departments ===
Calicut University Schools
Name	Departments
Language & Literature	English, Hindi, Malayalam & Comparative Literature and Sanskrit
Bioscience	Biotechnology, Botany, Life Science, Psychology, Zoology and Environment Science
Social Sciences	Economics, Folklore Studies, History, Philosophy, Political Science and Women's Studies
Mathematics & Computational Sciences	Computer Science, Mathematics and Statistics
Chemical & Physical Sciences	Chemistry, Physics and Nanoscience and Technology
Education	Education, Lifelong Learning and Extension and Physical Education
Information & Communication Studies	Journalism and Mass Communication and Library and Information Science
Fine Arts	Drama & Fine Arts
Business Studies	Commerce and Management Studies
Sociology, Geology and Law

Each school in Calicut University comprises a group of related departments, headed by director. Each department in the school has separate head of the department.

There are nine schools, 34 departments with three centres and 11 chairs. The university has two off campus centres, one at Thrissur and the other in Wayanad.

==== Off campus campus centres I ====
1. Lakshadweep
2. Dr. John Matthai Centre, Thrissur
3. Centre for Folklore Studies

==== Off campus campus centres II ====
1. School of Drama and Fine Arts: Located in Aranattukara, a suburb of Thrissur city this department of the university provides formal education and training in drama and theatre. The school is affiliated with National School of Drama. The school was established in 1977 as a centre for drama artists in Kerala. In 2000, the institute started the music department offering Post Graduate and PhD courses.
2. Institute of Tribal Studies and Research: Institute of Tribal Studies & Research is located at Chethalayam in Wayanad district is established for empowering tribal students for higher education. The centre is also devoted to carry out research on tribal communities.

=== Affiliated colleges ===
From the 2019 Annual Report

Its current jurisdiction extends to five central and northern districts of the state. The university currently has about 391 'affiliated colleges'. These colleges are spread over Malappuram district (122), Kozhikode district (105 colleges), Thrissur district (74), Palakkad district (73) and Wayanad district (17). It also conducts examinations for the students of the affiliated colleges.

A total annual intake of students in the affiliated colleges is nearly 100,000. Most of the colleges are Self Financing Colleges and the rest are Government or Aided Colleges. Most of the colleges offer only under-graduate degrees, while around 100 colleges also offer post-graduate degrees.

==== Classification based on funding ====
- Government Colleges (41)
- Aided Colleges (60)
- Self Financing Colleges (290)

Subject-wise they comprise 254 Arts & Science Colleges, 63 Training Colleges, 40 Engineering/Technical Colleges, 10 Law Colleges, 33 Arabic/Oriental Title Colleges, 11 I. H. R. D. Centres, eight Management Studies Colleges, one Music College, one Fine Arts college, two Colleges of Physical Education, two colleges for Hotel Management.

The university publishes a list of affiliated colleges and courses.

==== Types of affiliated colleges ====
- Architecture-Engineering
- Training
- Management
- Law
- Arts & Science-Arabic/Oriental Title
- Physical Education

== Academics ==
=== Rankings ===
University of Calicut ranked 70th among Indian Universities in the NIRF ranking 2023.

University and College rankings

General – India
- NIRF (Universities) (2023): 70

=== Demographics ===
Demographics (NIRF-2020)
	Undergraduate (UG)	Graduate (PG)
Socially Challenged (ST+SC+OBC)	285	1151
Economically Backward	24	148
International	0	3
Total	301	1799

== Student life ==
=== Cultural festival ===
The annual 'Interzonal' cultural festival, 'Kalolsavam', is held from January to April or between. The Interzones are conducted among students from the independent 'affiliated colleges' spread across five northern Kerala Districts. The various Kerala Districts conducts different zonal competitions and the winners gain entry to the 'interzonal' event.

The festivals go on for a week (offstage and onstage).

=== Sports competitions ===
The annual sports competitions also occur between the inter colleges among the zones and the zonal colleges. The sports event follow the cultural event and go on for a week.

=== Inter University Championship ===
- All India inter-university men's football championship -2022
- Overall title in the National men's inter-university athletics championships- 2012,2024
- All India Inter University Hand Ball Trophy- 2022

== Honorary Degree ==
Recipients of Honorary Degree

- S. K. Pottekkatt: A famous Malayalam writer from Kerala, Pottekkatt won the Jnanpith award in 1980 for the novel Oru Desathinte Katha (The Story of a Locale), D.Litt. conferred on 25.03.1982
- Vaikom Muhammad Basheer: Freedom Fighter, Novelist and Short Story Writer. Awarded Padmasree in 1982. Fondly remembered as the Beypore Sulthan, D.Litt. conferred on 19.01.1987
- Prof. M. M. Ghani: The first Vice-Chancellor of the University of Calicut.An academic administrator par excellence, devoted every moment of his six year long tenure to giving it a strong foundation, LL.D. conferred on 24.08.1987
- K. P. Kesava Menon: A patriot, idealist, and Indian independence activist. He was a member of the Home Rule League. Menon was the founder of Mathrubhumi. D.Litt. conferred on 24.08.1987
- N. V. Krishna Warrier: Former Director of Bhasha Institute, D.Litt. conferred on 24.08.1987
- M. T. Vasudevan Nair: Popularly known as MT, is an Indian Author, Screenplay writer, and film director. Awarded the Jnanpith in 1995. D.Litt. conferred on 22.06.1996
- P. K. Warrier: Indian Ayurvedic Physician. Chief Physician and Managing Trustee of Aryavaidyasala, Kottakkal, Kerala. D.Litt. conferred on 22.05.1999.
- M. F. Husain: An Indian-born Qatari eminent painter. D.Litt. conferred on 25.09.2003
- V. R. Krishna Iyer: Popularly known as Justice VR Krishna Iyer. Former Judge in the Supreme Court of India. • Conferred with Padma Vibhushan in 1999. D.Litt. conferred on 25.09.2003
- Arun Nigavekar: An educationalist, a Physicist, Former Chairperson of UGC and Vice-Chancellor of the University of Pune. Aptly called as "Father of Quality Movement in Higher Education in India". D.Sc. conferred on 25.09.2003.
- Kamala Surayya: (formerly known as Madhavikutty). An Indian English Poet and Litterateur and a leading Malayalam author. D.Litt. conferred on 02.02.2006
- Dr. Amrik Singh: Eminent academician, Literature, educationalist and former Vice Chancellor of Panjabi University. D.Litt. Conferred on 02.02.2006.
- Lakshmi Sahgal: Active in the independence movement of India and commanded the ‘Rani of Jhansi Regiment of INA’. She was active in politics in independent India and was a member of the Rajya Sabha. A doctor by profession, she was active as a medical practitioner and a social worker. Awarded Padma Vibhushan in 1998. • D.Litt. conferred on 2 December 2010.
- Irfan Habib: A historian of international repute. He has served as Chairman of the Indian Council of Historical Research, President of the Indian History Congress, and Fellow of British Royal History Society. Acclaimed as one of the greatest living historians of India today. Awarded Padma Vibhushan in 2005. D.Litt. conferred on 2 December 2010.
- Mammootty: prominent actor of the Malayalam Film Industry. He has won three National Film Awards besides several state awards. Bharath Mammootty continues to be a leading artist icon of Indian Cinema. Awarded Padma Vibhushan in 1998. D.Litt. conferred on 2 December 2010.
- Montek Singh Ahluwalia: A pioneering Economist and Developmental Consultant. The Former Rhodes Scholar and academic was honored with Padmavibhushan in 2011. D.Litt. conferred on 17 August 2013.
- M. S. Swaminathan: An agricultural scientist with a global reputation. Known as the architect of India's Green revolution. MS Swaminathan Institute is a pioneering institution in agricultural research founded by him. Awarded the World Food Prize in 1988. D.Litt. conferred on 17 August 2013.
- Fathima Beevi: Leading legal expert, rose to the position of Justice at Supreme Court by dint of sheer industry and dedication. After retirement, served a spell as the Governor of Tamil Nadu. D.Litt. conferred on 17 August 2013.
- Sultan bin Muhammad Al-Qasimi: The Ruler of Sharjah & Supreme Council Member of the UAE. A prolific scholar and polymath with multiple Ph.Ds., awards, and distinctions. He is a recipient of eighteen honorary doctorates from various international universities. He writes both in Arabic and English and his books have been translated into many languages. • D.Litt. conferred on 26 September 2017 at Lok Bhavan, Thiruvananthapuram.
- Mohanlal: He has acted in more than 350 films and produced/coproduced 35 films. He is the recipient of numerous national and state awards. Authored two books- Hridayathinte Kaiyoppu and Sammohanam. D.Litt. conferred on 29 January 2018.
- P. T. Usha: Known as the sprint queen of India also known as Payyoli Express. She is a legendary athlete who brought glory to our nation. Won numerous prizes and international medals.Achieved national, Asian, and international records during her career. • She was chosen as the Sports Woman of the Century by the Indian Olympic Association in the year 2000. D.Litt., conferred on 29 January 2018.

== Notable alumni ==
=== Politician ===
- Puthalath Dinesan, Politician Central Committee Member Of Communist Party of India (Marxist) and Chief Editor Of Deshabhimani
- R. Bindu, Minister of Higher Education Kerala
- K. T. Jaleel, Minister of Higher Education Kerala and Minority affairs on the period of 2016–2021
- P. Sreeramakrishnan, speaker of Kerala Legislative Assembly on the period of 2016–2021
- M. B. Rajesh, Current Minister of Local Self-Governments and Excise Kerala
- P. A. Mohammed Riyas, Minister for Public Works Department and Tourism, Government of Kerala former and former all India President of the Democratic Youth Federation of India (DYFI).
- N. Samsudheen MLA of Mannarkad on the period of 2016–2021, 2021–2026
- V. T. Balram, MLA of the Thrithaala on the period of 2016–2021
- Mohammed Faizal P. P, Member of Lok Sabha
- Richard Hay, politician
- P K Navas Member of the Kerala Legislative Assembly

=== Judiciary ===
- Surendran Pattel, Judge for 240th Texas District Court

=== Academicians ===
- K. K. N. Kurup, historian and former Vice-Chancellor of the University of Calicut
- M. G. S. Narayanan, headed the Department of History at Calicut University from 1976 to 1990
- Abraham V. M, vice-chancellor of Christ University, Bengaluru
- Ayyappanpillai Ajayaghosh, organic chemist, Shanti Swarup Bhatnagar laureate
- Kalliat Valsaraj, chemical engineer, academic and author
- M. N. Karassery, Malayalam author and former HOD of the Malayalam department of University of Calicut

=== Sportsperson ===
- Anju Bobby George, Indian athlete
- Jimmy George, volleyball player
- V. P. Suhair, Indian professional footballer
- V. Diju, Indian Badminton player. Olympian, Arjuna Awardee
- Cyril C. Valloor, Indian volleyball player

=== Journalist ===
- Tareq Ayyoub - Arab television reporter of Palestinian nationality, employed by Al Jazeera
- John Brittas - Indian politician and journalist

=== Arts ===
- Vineeth Kumar, Film actor
- Vinod Kovoor
- Surabhi Lakshmi
- Zakariya Mohammed, film director
- T. V. Chandran, film director
- Deedi Damodaran, film director
- Jenith Kachappilly, Indian film director
- Girish Puthenchery, Indian lyricist, poet, scriptwriter and screenwriter
- Rajesh Touchriver, Indian film writer, director
- Ranjith, Indian film director
- Ranjith Padinhateeri, biological physicist, N-Bios laureate
- Shyamaprasad, Indian film director
- Sithara, playback singer
- Sunny Wayne, Indian Actor
- C. R. Rajagopalan, folklore researcher and writer.

=== Engineers ===
- K. Radhakrishnan, Padmabhushan, Former Chairman, Indian Space Research Organisation
- M. Chandra Dathan, Padmashree, Former Director, Vikram Sarabhai Space Centre (VSSC)
- Babu Bharadwaj, writer and journalist
- T. G. Ravi, Malayalam film actor and MD of Suntec Tyres
- Anand Neelakantan, writer
- Sreekumaran Thampi, Lyricist, director, producer, screenwriter
- Prakash Bare, actor, producer
- M Sivasankar IAS
- Prasanth B Nair, Astronaut

=== Others ===
- Thalappil Pradeep, Indian scientist
- Jithin Premnath, managing director of Clover Doyen, Awards won – Pathrose Puthran, Madhura Chinthamani, Tally Award & Micro Kelu

== Vice chancellors ==
- M. M. Gani (13/5/1969–31/5/1975)
- N. A. Noor Mohammed (14/11/1975–26/11/1978)
- K. A. Jaleel (31/8/1979–27/2/1983)
- T. N. Jayachandran (14/9/1983–13/9/1987)
- T. K. Ravindran (2/11/1987–1/2/1992)
- A. N. P Ummerkutty (5/2/1992–4/2/1996)
- K. K. N. Kurup (20/6/1998–19/6/2002)
- Syed Iqbal hasnain (23/10/2002–22/10/2006)
- Anwar Jahan Zuberi (26/2/2007–25/2/2011)
- Dr. M. Abdul Salam (12/8/2011–11/8/2015)
- Dr. K. Mohammed Basheer (21/11/2015–20/11/2019)
- M. K. Jayaraj (2019–2024)
- Dr. Poovathinthodiyil Raveendran (22/1/2026–present)

== See also ==
Madhava Observatory
