= Altered Species =

2001 film by Miles Feldman

- Directed by: Miles Feldman
- Written by: Serge Rodnunsky
- Produced by: Serge Rodnunsky
- Starring: Allen Lee Haff; Leah Rowan; Guy Veig
- Cinematography: Pierre Chemaly
- Music by: Evan Evans
- Distributed by: Rojak Films
- Release date: September 1, 2001
- Running time: 91 min.
- Language: English

Altered Species, earlier known as Rodentz, is a 2001 horror film directed by Miles Feldman and starring Allen Lee Haff, Leah Rowan, and Guy Veig. The plot is about a scientist who has found a way to regenerate damaged tissue in the body.

== Premise ==
Schultz, a scientist searching for a way to end cancer, creates a green substance. While the experiment's results look promising as it can "hunt and destroy" cancer cells, he loses his funding and must shut the lab down.

His assistant, Walter, gets rid of the green substance by pouring it down the sink. Due to pipes in the basement having leaks, the substance falls in a spot where it is exposed to rats.

After the scientist leaves, Walter invites friends over for a party. At first, a cat and the lab janitor go missing.

However, as the party continues, the rats attack the partygoers. When the survivors think they are safe, another attack begins, which includes a giant man-sized rat.

== Home video ==
The film was released on DVD in 2011 by Artisan Entertainment. It was released as a cropped full screen video. A special feature on the DVD is a commentary. A DVD Talk review said of the commentary, "We are treated to long periods of silence punctuated by the occasional muffled laugh. When someone makes a comment, the rest of the people say things like "yeah" or "that's cool".

== Reception ==
A review by Staci Layne Wilson in her book Animal Movies Guide, said that "this ratty little fright-flick is cheesy at best". Rob Lineberger, writing for DVD Verdict, said, "If only the filmmakers had followed their own tagline, "Hide the cheese…" The cheese is in full view, and it stinks to boot".

Noel Gross, writing for DVD Talk, said that the film is "Yawnsville story about a gaggle of cookie-cutter college kiddos who decide to get their party started at an abandoned building where a disgraced professor is trying to cure cancer by juicing lab rats full of glowing green goo a la Re-Animator."

TV Guide also agreed the movie is "cheesy horror."
