= Surya: The Power of Love =

Indian Kannada language romantic action drama film

- Release poster
- Directed by: Sagar Dass
- Written by: Sagar Das; Manikantha KV (dialogue)
- Produced by: Basavaraj M Benni; Ravi M Benni
- Starring: Prashantha Surya; Harshitha Mk; P. Ravi Shankar
- Cinematography: Maniraj DB Halli
- Edited by: Madhu Tumbkere
- Music by: Sri Sastha
- Production company: Nandi Cinemas
- Distributed by: Casablanca Film Factory
- Release date: 15 January 2026
- Running time: 128 minutes
- Country: India
- Language: Kannada

Surya: The Power of Love is a 2026 Indian Kannada-language romantic action drama film directed by Sagar Dass. The film is produced by Basavaraj M Benni and Ravi M Benni. The film stars Prashantha Surya, Harshitha Mk in the lead roles.

== Cast ==
- Prashantha Surya as Surya
- Harshitha Mk as Bhumika
- P. Ravi Shankar as Maari
- Shruti as Mamatha

== Reception ==
Maheswara Reddy of Bangalore Mirror said that "Director Sagar Dass has attempted to keep the audiences entertained by including a number of action and song sequences. The director tries to narrate the story in a unique method." Susmita Sameera of Times Of India said that "While the core storyline doesn’t break new ground, the film does manage to stay engaging through a handful of unexpected twists and surprise character revelations that appear at key moments." A Sharadhaa of The New Indian Express said that "It wants to speak about trafficking, class fractures, compromised ambition, and personal accountability — and manages to touch all these threads, even if not always with depth."
