= Chill (film) =

- DVD cover
- Directed by: Serge Rodnunsky
- Based on: "Cool Air" by H. P. Lovecraft
- Produced by: Serge Rodnunsky; David A. Hoffman
- Starring: Thomas Calabro; Ashley Laurence; James Russo
- Cinematography: Serge Rodnunsky
- Edited by: Serge Rodnunsky
- Music by: Nigel Holton; Kurt Oldman; Jeffrey Walton
- Production company: Rojak Films
- Distributed by: Safecracker Pictures; Starmedia Home Entertainment
- Release date: February 15, 2007 (US); (DVD premiere)
- Running time: 88 minutes
- Country: United States
- Language: English

Chill is a 2007 horror film written and directed by Serge Rodnunsky and starring Thomas Calabro, Ashley Laurence, Shaun Kurtz, and James Russo.

== Development and plot ==
The film was based on H. P. Lovecraft's "Cool Air". Similar plot elements include the fact that the doctor in the film (played by Shaun Kurtz) is named Dr. Muñoz as in Lovecraft's story, and must live in refrigerated conditions in order to survive. There is also a mention of the Necronomicon in the film; while this does not occur in Lovecraft's "Cool Air", it does serve in the movie as a clue to its Lovecraftian inspiration. Part of the plot hinges on the refrigeration system breaking down, again as in the Lovecraft story. Physically, the character of Dr Muñoz in the film does not resemble the character described in Lovecraft's story, nor does he speak with a Spanish accent.

Overall, however, the plot of the movie moves away from the Lovecraft story in depicting Muñoz as the controller of a serial killer preying on prostitutes. Muñoz lives in the back of a deli which he runs, and the protagonist Sam (Thomas Calabro), a writer who comes to work at the deli for survival money, gets dragged into the web of killings. Sam also falls in love with a woman named Maria (Ashley Laurence) who runs a clothing stores across the street and is being threatened by a local cop, Detective Defazio (James Russo), whom she dated once.

The DVD packaging for the Australian release through Flashback Entertainment does not feature Lovecraft's name anywhere, though the American packaging indicates that Lovecraft's tale inspired the movie. The film is omitted from Charles P. Mitchell's otherwise fairly comprehensive The Complete H.P. Lovecraft Filmography (Greenwood Press, 2001), possibly because the makers of Chill did not overtly capitalise on Lovecraft's name.

The Pittsburgh Post-Gazette summarizes the plot as "Let's just say someone dies but cheats Death by harvesting flesh and dabbling in the occult."

== Cast ==
- Thomas Calabro as Sam
- Ashley Laurence as Maria
- Shaun Kurtz as Dr. Munoz
- James Russo as Detective Defazio
- Victor Grant as Tre
- Clark Moore as Tor
- Barbara Gruen as Mrs. Herrero
- Adam Vincent as Steven

== Reception ==
The film won Best Achievement in Fantasy and Horror at the Worldfest International Film Festival, was nominated for Best Horror Feature Film at the Shockerfest International Film Festival, and was an Official Selection at both the H.P. Lovecraft Film Festival and World Horror Convention in Toronto. DVD Verdict gave the film a reasonably complimentary review, while Home Theater Info is definitely praiseful of the film asking readers of the review to "give this movie a chance and enjoy." Slasherpool.com described a number of positives (the casting and directing) and negatives (the pacing and atmosphere).
