= War Flowers =

- Directed by: Serge Rodnunsky
- Written by: Serge Rodnunsky
- Produced by: Jimmy Lifton; Serge Rodnunsky; Alexander Tabrizi
- Starring: Jason Gedrick; Christina Ricci; Tom Berenger
- Cinematography: Andrew Mclean; Serge Rodnunsky
- Edited by: Serge Rodnunsky
- Music by: Evan Evans
- Distributed by: CMD Distribution
- Release date: 23 February 2012 (Australia)
- Running time: 100 minutes
- Country: United States
- Language: English

War Flowers is a 2012 American war film written and directed by Serge Rodnunsky and starring Jason Gedrick, Christina Ricci, and Tom Berenger. It is the first feature film having been produced by Unity Studios.

== Plot ==
War Flowers is an American Civil War tale about a woman in North Carolina named Sarabeth Ellis whose husband has been called up for military service by the Confederate States of America. While she and her little daughter Melody suffer with food shortage, they also are threatened by a creepy neighbor who has avoided military service.

After a skirmish between Union and Confederate soldiers right outside their farmhouse, they discover a gravely wounded Union soldier named Louis who seems to be dying in their cellar. Together with her daughter, Sarabeth decides to nurse him back to health and even hides him when several renegade soldiers of the Confederacy check the house.

Sarabeth and Louis develop romantic feelings, but do not seem to act on their attraction because Sarabeth is married. Once Louis has sufficiently recovered, Sarabeth tries to ensure he is taken back to the Union lines with the help of two escaping slaves. However, before they leave the farmhouse, there is one more violent confrontation with the evil neighbor.

The final section of the film includes a dream-like sequences in which Sarabeth's husband seems to make a final visit to the farm, even though it is clear that he already has fallen in battle. The movie shows the war's final days with a catastrophic attack at the farm that burns the family home to its foundations. Sarabeth and her daughter appear close to starvation. Finally, Louis is able to return for a reunion. Sarabeth revives and talks about her hope for a new world of peace. "We're going to look towards tomorrow and a new life," she tells Sarabeth and Louis. Together, they walk down the road away from the farm.

== Cast ==
- Christina Ricci as Sarabeth Ellis
- Jason Gedrick as Louis McIntire
- Tom Berenger as Gen. McIntire
- Gabrielle Popa as Melody Ellis
- Bren Foster as John Ellis

== Reception ==
The Dove Foundation awarded the film their seal "Family-Approved" and considered it "well worth your viewing time".
