= K. A. Jaleel =

Indian academic (1922–2012)

- Born: 22 September 1922; North Paravur
- Died: 12 September 2012 (aged 89)
- Education: U.C. College, Aluva; University College, Thiruvananthapuram
- Occupation: Former Vice-Chancellor of Calicut University
- Spouse: E. T. Noor Jahan

K. A. Jaleel (22 September 1922 – 12 September 2012) was an English professor and former Vice-Chancellor of Calicut University.

== Early life and education ==
K. A. Jaleel was born in 1922 at North Paravur to B Kunhali and Naseema. He went to Paravur English High School for schooling and was a recipient of Maharaja's Muhammadan scholarship for Muslim students. He had his higher education from U.C. College, Aluva, and University College, Thiruvananthapuram.

== Career ==
In 1945, Jaleel briefly worked as an English lecturer in Goa and then in Vaniyambadi Islamia College. He taught English language at Farook College for eight years from 1948, before becoming the principal. He served as a principal of Farook College from 1957 to 1979, and then was appointed the Vice-Chancellor of Calicut University, serving from 1979 to 1983.

Jaleel was the Founder-chairman of the Social Advancement Foundation of India (SAFI), and served as the chairman of the Wakf Board. He was a member of the Calicut University and Cochin University of Science and Technology Senate, and a member of the academic council of Madras University.

He served as the president of Calicut English Association, and as the vice-president of the Raulathul Uloom Association He was an advisor to the All India Muslim Educational Society and Kerala Muslim Educational Society, and served as a Trustee of P.M. Foundation He also served as a member of State Public Board of Examination, Higher Education Council, and the UGC Academic Centres Committee He also served as a chairman of the PP Mohammed Memorial Trust.

Jaleel also served as the president of Masjid-al-Ashar and the Calicut Rotary Club

== Books ==
Jaleel's works include:

- Hasya Prakasham (Malayalam 1958)
- Encyclopaedia in Malayalam (Viswavijnana Kosam 1970)
- Lipikalum Manava Samskaravum. (1980)
- The Muslim Presence in Kerala
- New Horizons
- You Build Your Own Future
- Thirinjunokkumbol (autobiography)

== Awards ==
- I.C. Chacko Award of the Kerala Sahitya Academy
- Shah Sahib Award
- Ramasramam Award
- Rotary Award for Excellence in Education.
- Senior Citizens Excellence Award

== Personal life ==
Jaleel was married to Aysha, and had four children, T A Zuhara, T A Shoukathali, T A Nazeema and T A Haleem. He died on 12 September 2012.
