= Dreadful Chapters =

2024 Indian film

- First look poster
- Directed by: Nirmal Baby Varghese
- Written by: Nirmal Baby Varghese
- Produced by: Baby Chaithanya; Nirmal Baby Varghese
- Starring: Jeffin Joseph; Varun Ravindran; Arya Krishnan
- Cinematography: Midhun Eravil
- Music by: Fazal Khais
- Production company: Casablanca Film Factory
- Release dates: August 2023 (Hollywood Gold Awards); 6 September 2024 (OTT)
- Country: India
- Language: Malayalam

Dreadful Chapters is a 2023 Indian Malayalam-language time-loop horror film directed by Nirmal Baby Varghese. Produced by Baby Chaithanya and Nirmal under the banner of Casablanca Film Factory. The film was released in Malayalam along with the dubbed versions in Tamil, Telugu, Hindi and Kannada languages.

== Premise ==
The film narrates the story of six friends gather in a remote homestay to celebrate their vacation. They were surprised to discover a cave there. In the cave, they are unaware of the mysteries that await them.

== Cast ==
- Jeffin Joseph
- Varun Ravindran
- Arya Krishnan
- Nibin Stany
- Shyam Salash
- Lasya Balakrishnan

== Production ==
Director Nirmal announced Dreadful Chapters on Facebook on 1 October 2022. The film is produced by Baby Chaithanya under the banner of Casablanca Film Factory in association with Vivid Frames. Principal photography began on 7 November 2022 with a customary pooja function held at Cherupuzha, Kannur. Other primary filming locations were in Odakkolly Natural cave, Koovappara, Kunnumkai, Josegiri. Shooting was wrapped on 16 December 2022 at Koovappara, Kasaragod.

== Soundtrack ==
The original background score and music is composed by Fazal Khais.

== Release ==
It premiered at the Hollywood Gold Awards in August 2023.

=== Home media ===
Film started streaming on Amazon Prime Video and BookMyShow Stream from 6 September 2024.

== Reception ==
In his review, Don Anelli of Asian Movie Pulse appreciated the effort of director Nirmal and his crew members and wrote, "Generally enjoyable indie fare from India."

== Awards and accolades ==
=== Film festival official selections ===
Year	Film festival	Ref(s)
2024	Kalaburagi International Film Festival	

== See also ==
- List of Malayalam horror films
- List of films featuring time loops
- List of films made with Final Cut Pro X
