= Nimbiya Banada Myaga Page 1 =

2025 Indian drama film

- Theatrical release poster
- Directed by: Ashok Kadaba
- Written by: Ashok Kadaba
- Produced by: V. Madesh
- Starring: Shanmukha Govindraj; Sunaad Raj; Sangeetha; Tanushree; Trisha Mugu Suresh; Padma Vasanthi; Sundeep Malani
- Cinematography: Siddu Kanchanahalli
- Music by: Songs: Aaron Karthik; Praveen Sreenivas Murthy; Score: Palani D. Senapathi
- Production company: MGPX Enterprises
- Distributed by: Vijay Cinemas; Casablanca Film Factory
- Release date: 4 April 2025
- Running time: 137 minutes
- Country: India
- Language: Kannada

Nimbiya Banada Myaga Page 1 is a 2025 Indian Kannada-language drama film directed by Ashok Kadaba. The film stars Shanmukha Govindraj, Sunaad Raj, Sangeetha, Tanushree, Trisha Mugu Suresh, and Padmavasanthi. Sandeep Malani

== Cast ==
- Shanmukha Govindraj as Achchu
- Sunaad Raj (Megha Maale fame) as Raghu
- Sangeetha Anil as Varalakshmi
- Tanushree as Vaishali
- Trisha as Venkata lakshmi Mugu Suresh as Chennanna
- Padma Vasanthi as Dhanamma
- Sundeep Malani as Cheranna

== Production ==
In 2022, Ashok Kadaba narrated the script to Shanmukha Govindraj, and filming began in December that year.

== Soundtrack ==
The soundtrack consists of songs composed by Aaron Karthik and Praveen Sreenivas Murthy, while the background score was by Palani D. Senapathi.

Track listing
No.	Title	Lyrics	Music	Singer(s)	Length
1.	"Title Track"	—	Praveen Sreenivas Murthy	Shanmuka Govindraj, Sindhu Shanmuka
2.	"Madhura Mandira"	Aaron Karthik	Aaron Karthik	Aarohi	3:25
3.	"Kannale Mathu Anchale Kuthu"	Vikas	Aaron Karthik	Priya Yadav	3:23
4.	"Modala Thodala"	Aaron Karthik	Aaron Karthik	Priya Yadav	2:51

== Release ==
Nimbiya Banada Myaga Page 1 was released theatrically on 4 April 2025. Casablanca Film Factory handled the digital distribution, with the film beginning to stream on Amazon Prime Video from 1 January 2026.

== Reception ==
Vinay Lokesh of The Times of India rated the film two-and-a-half out of five stars and wrote, "The narrative and screenplay which seems to be outdated fails to make an impact. Apart from the mother and son emotions, the movie which lacks other factors fails to leave an impression." Y. Maheswara Reddy of Bangalore Mirror gave it two-and-a-half out of five stars and wrote, "The selection of locations for this movie is good. The lush scenery of Chikkamagalur and surrounding areas is a visual treat. However, the script looks incongruous."
