= Life After Sex =

- Directed by: Serge Rodnunsky
- Written by: Serge Rodnunsky
- Starring: Serge Rodnunsky; Lane Lenhart; Maggie Mabie; Kathleen Beller; Tommy Chong
- Distributed by: Rojak Films
- Release date: 1992
- Running time: 81 minutes
- Countries: Canada; United States
- Language: English

Life After Sex is a 1992 film directed by Serge Rodnunsky by Rojak Films. It stars Rodnunsky, Lane Lenhart, Maggie Mabie, Kathleen Beller, and Tommy Chong.
