= Arun Nigavekar =

Indian physicist and educator (1942–2021)

Arun Nigavekar (14 March 1942 – 23 April 2021) was an Indian physicist and educator. He was the vice-chancellor of the University of Pune from 1998 to 2000 and the vice-chairperson and then chairperson of the University Grants Commission (UGC) from 2000 to 2005.

Nigavekar helped establish the National Assessment and Accreditation Council (NAAC) body as the Founder Director. A. P. J. Kalam, the former President of India, dubbed him as the 'Father of Quality Education in India'.

== Early life ==
Nigavekar studied in Pune and Uppsala in Sweden where he held SIDA Fellowship. He was awarded the Dakshina Fellowship by Rajaram College in Kolhapur.

== Career ==
Nigavekar helped advance the use of technology and internationalization of higher education. He highlighted the concept of Quality in Higher Education. He served as Vice Chancellor of University of Pune. He has 70 research publications to his credit.

He became a Professor in Materials Science in Pune University in 1977. He established the Center for Advanced Studies in Physics in Pune in 1980.

He served as Director of Educational Media Research Center and established Communication Science Department in Pune University in the 1990s.

He was Chairman and Vice Chairman of UGC (2000-2005). He helped formulate a strategy for higher education in the Tenth Plan of Government of India.

He was a visiting professor in University of York in U.K. and University of Western Ontario in Canada in the 1980s. He was a founding editor of Physics Educational Journal. He was a permanent member and was Vice-Chairman of Asian Physics Education Network, a UNESCO organization.

He was a member of UGC from 1993-1996 and initiated reforms such as decentralization of UGC administration. He was a founding Director of National Assessment and Accreditation Council, an autonomous body of UGC. He developed instruments and methodology for judging quality in Indian higher education, which was endorsed by International Network for Quality Assuring Agencies in Higher Education (INQUAHE). He was a member of Distance Education Council and an adviser to Commonwealth of Learning in Canada.

== Recognition ==
He was awarded Honorary Doctorates by Tilka Manjhi Bhagalpur University, Nagarjuna University, Guru Nanak Dev University, Jagadguru Rambhadracharya Handicapped University, University of Calicut and Potti Sreeramulu Telugu University.

He won the Phia Foundation Award, UNESCO honor, Swami Vivekanand Award, Advocate D R Nagakar Award, Shiromani Award and the Delhi Ratan Award.

Nigavekar appeared in the Financial Chronicle, Sakal (a Marathi newspaper), the Times of India and The Hindu.

He headed the committee of experts appointed by the Union Public Service Commission (UPSC) to review the existing structure of Civil Services (Main) examination and suggest necessary changes.

Nigavekar headed a committee created by the Maharashtra State Government to formulate and implement a holistic conservation plan for historic lake Lonar.
