= Ranjith Padinhateeri =

Indian biological physicist

- Born: Malappuram, Kerala, India
- Education: Zamorin's Guruvayurappan College; University of Calicut; Indian Institute of Technology Madras; Curie Institute (Paris)
- Known for: Theoretical studies of biological phenomena
- Awards: 2010 DBT Young Investigator Award; 2012 IIT Mumbai Young Investigator Award; 2013 DBT Senior Innovative Young Investigator Award; 2014 IIT Mumbai Excellence in Teaching Award; 2017–18 N-BIOS Prize
- Scientific career
- Fields: Biological physics
- Workplaces: University of Illinois at Chicago; Northwestern University; Indian Institute of Technology, Mumbai
- Doctoral advisor: P. B. Sunil Kumar; Jean-François Joanny; David Lacoste; John F. Marko

Ranjith Padinhateeri is an Indian biological physicist and a professor at the Indian Institute of Technology, Mumbai. He is known for his biological studies using statistical mechanics, polymer physics, and soft matter theory. The Department of Biotechnology of the Government of India awarded him the National Bioscience Award for Career Development, one of the highest Indian science awards, for his contributions to biosciences, in 2017–18.

== Biography ==
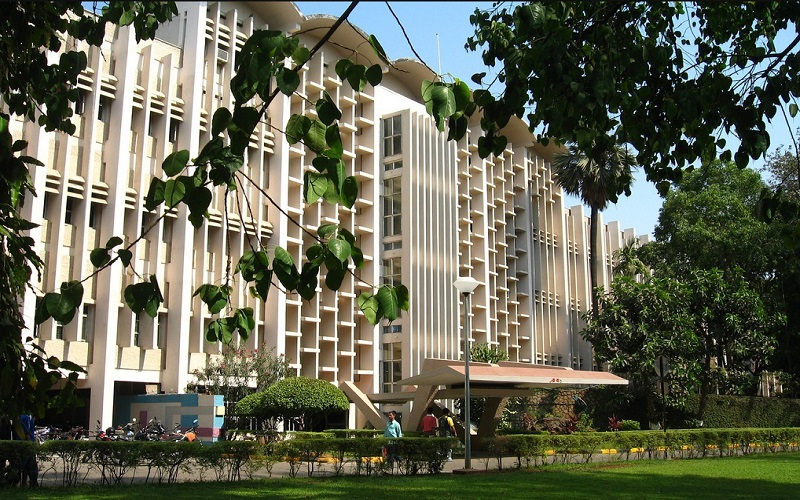
IIT Mumbai

Ranjith Padinhateeri, born in Malappuram district of the south Indian state of Kerala, did his early schooling at AUP School Marakkara, V. V. M. Higher Secondary School and MSM HSS Kallingalparamba before joining Zamorin's Guruvayurappan College to obtain a BSc in physics from the University of Calicut in 1997. Moving to Chennai, he earned his MSc from the Indian Institute of Technology, Madras in 2000 and continued there for his doctoral studies under the guidance of P. B. Sunil Kumar which earned him a PhD in 2005 for his thesis, Statistical mechanics of semiflexible polymers : A study of single filaments. His post doctoral training, initially, were under John F. Marko at two US universities, University of Illinois at Chicago and Northwestern University from 2005 to 2007 when he moved to France to continue his training at the laboratories of Jean-Francois Joanny and David Lacoste of Institut Curie during 2007–09. He returned to India in 2009 to join the Indian Institute of Technology, Mumbai as an assistant professor where he served as an associate professor from 2014 and holds the position of professor since 2018 at the department of biosciences and bioengineering.

Padinhateeri is known to be involved in studies in the field of biological physics, focusing on cellular processes applying nonequilibrium approaches. His approach also involves employment of tools from physics such as polymer physics and soft-matter theory. He has published a number of articles; (Note: Please see Selected bibliography section) ResearchGate, an online repository of scientific articles has listed 34 of them. He is the Professor-in-charge at the Koita Centre for Digital Health, IIT Bombay, since 2024.

== Awards and honors ==
The Department of Biotechnology of the Government of India awarded him the National Bioscience Award for Career Development, one of the highest Indian science awards, for him contributions to biosciences, in 2017–18. He is also a recipient of Innovative Young Investigator Award of the Department of Biotechnology (2009-2010), IIT Mumbai Young Investigator Award (2012), Senior Innovative Young Investigator Award, Department of Biotechnology (2013), and Excellence in Teaching Award of IIT Mumbai (2014).

== Selected bibliography ==
- Padinhateeri, Ranjith; Das, Dibyendu; Bameta, Tripti (1 June 2018). "Coupling of replisome movement with nucleosome dynamics can contribute to the parent–daughter information transfer". Nucleic Acids Research. 46 (10): 4991–5000. doi:10.1093/nar/gky207. ISSN 0305-1048. PMC 6007630. PMID 29850895.
- Jha, Narendra Nath; Ranganathan, Srivastav; Kumar, Rakesh; Mehra, Surabhi; Panigrahi, Rajlaxmi; Navalkar, Ambuja; Ghosh, Dhiman; Kumar, Ashutosh; Padinhateeri, Ranjith (6 February 2018). "Complexation of NAC-Derived Peptide Ligands with the C-Terminus of α-Synuclein Accelerates Its Aggregation". Biochemistry. 57 (5): 791–804. doi:10.1021/acs.biochem.7b01090. ISSN 0006-2960. PMID 29286644.
- Padinhateeri, Ranjith; Das, Dibyendu; Bameta, Tripti (2018). "Coupling of replisome movement with nucleosome dynamics can contribute to the parent–daughter information transfer". Nucleic Acids Research. 46 (10): 4991–5000. bioRxiv 10.1101/154559. doi:10.1093/nar/gky207. PMC 6007630. PMID 29850895.
- Padinhateeri, Ranjith; Das, Dibyendu; Inamdar, Mandar M.; Jain, Ishutesh; Bajpai, Gaurav (30 January 2017). "Binding of DNA-bending non-histone proteins destabilizes regular 30-nm chromatin structure". PLOS Computational Biology. 13 (1) e1005365. Bibcode:2017PLSCB..13E5365B. doi:10.1371/journal.pcbi.1005365. ISSN 1553-7358. PMC 5305278. PMID 28135276.
- Kar, Rajesh Kumar; Kharerin, Hungyo; Padinhateeri, Ranjith; Bhat, Paike Jayadeva (6 January 2017). "Multiple Conformations of Gal3 Protein Drive the Galactose-Induced Allosteric Activation of the GAL Genetic Switch of Saccharomyces cerevisiae" (PDF). Journal of Molecular Biology. 429 (1): 158–176. doi:10.1016/j.jmb.2016.11.005. ISSN 0022-2836. PMID 27913116.

== See also ==
- Nucleosome
- Saccharomyces cerevisiae
