= Serge Rodnunsky =

American filmmaker

Serge Rodnunsky is a film-maker who has directed almost 50 feature films as part of Rojak Films and now Interlight Entertainment . He started his career as a dancer and choreographer and worked in American Ballet Theatre. He also studied Physics at New York University.

== Filmography ==
- Fighting to Forgive (completed)
- 2012 War Flowers
- 2010/1 The Portal
- 2007 Chill
- 2006 Dead Lenny
- 2005 Blade of the Vampire (video) (as Miles Feldman)
- 2005 Shattered Day
- 2005 Indigo Hearts
- 2004 Black Cat (video)
- 2004 The Dead of Night (video) (as Miles Feldman)
- 2003 Delusional (as Miles Feldman)
- 2001 Altered Species (as Miles Feldman)
- 2000 American Samurai
- 2000 NewsBreak
- 2000 Cypress Edge
- 2000 Fear Runs Silent (video)
- 2000 Tripfall
- 2000 Enticement (as Miles Feldman)
- 2000 Hitmen
- 2000 Split Intent
- 2000 BigBrother.com (as Miles Feldman)
- 1999 Silicon Towers
- 1999 Jack of Hearts
- 1997 Cold Night Into Dawn
- 1997 Dead Tides
- 1997 Malibu Nights
- 1997 Tiger
- 1996 Diamonds in the Rough
- 1996 Running Hard
- 1995 Final Equinox
- 1995 Blood Justice
- 1995 Hot Wired
- 1995 Powderburn
- 1995 Red Steel
- 1994 Brush with Death
- 1994 Lovers, Lovers
- 1993 Last Breath
- 1993 Mystic Seven
- 1993 Rage of Vengeance
- 1992 Life After Sex
- 1990 A Play for Saulie
- 1990 Bold Stroke
