= Bhargavi Nilayam =

1964 film by A. Vincent

- Film poster
- Directed by: A. Vincent
- Written by: Vaikom Muhammad Basheer
- Based on: Neelavelicham by Vaikom Muhammad Basheer
- Produced by: T. K. Pareekutty
- Starring: Madhu; Prem Nazir; Vijaya Nirmala; P. J. Antony; Kuthiravattom Pappu; Adoor Bhasi
- Cinematography: P. Bhaskar Rao
- Edited by: G. Venkitaraman
- Music by: M. S. Baburaj
- Production company: Chandrathara Productions
- Release date: 22 October 1964
- Running time: 162 minutes
- Country: India
- Language: Malayalam

Bhargavi Nilayam (transl. The House of Bhargavi) is a 1964 Indian Malayalam-language romantic horror film directed by A. Vincent (in his directorial debut) and written by Vaikom Muhammad Basheer based on the short story Neelavelicham. The film stars Madhu, Vijaya Nirmala, Prem Nazir and P. J. Antony.

The film depicts a compassionate relationship between a talented novelist and the spirit of a beautiful woman who had been murdered. The novelist is writing the story of this woman, into whose former house he has moved in as a tenant. The film mirrors in a meta-cinematic fashion the close and often symbiotic relationships between Malayalam filmmakers and writers in depicting a writer at work, collaborating with an intangible agency in the form of the eponymous Bhargavi. It was the directorial debut of A. Vincent. It is generally regarded as the first horror film in Malayalam.

== Cast ==
Principal cast

- Madhu as Novelist and the Writer
- Prem Nazir as Sasikumar
- Vijaya Nirmala as Bhargavi
- P. J. Antony as Narayanan Nair aka Nanukuttan
- Adoor Bhasi as Cheriya Pareekanni
- Kottayam Santha as Suma
- Kuthiravattam Pappu as Kuthiravattam Pappu
- Mala Shantha as Bhargavi's mother (voiced by T. R. Omana)

Cameo appearances

- Shobana Parameshwaran Nair as mail carrier

== Soundtrack ==
The film had a successful and acclaimed soundtrack composed by M. S. Baburaj which is regarded as the noted composer's master piece. The lyrics are penned by noted poet P. Bhaskaran. The soundtrack consists of seven songs, mostly based on Hindustani. Baburaj took inspiration from popular Bollywood songs while composing "Thamasamenthe Varuvan" (from "Mere Mehboob Tujhe" and also perhaps from "Humse Aaya Na Gaya") and "Vasantha Panchami" (from "Chaudhwin Ka Chand").

The soundtrack received immense critical praise for the high quality instrumentation and was one of the biggest audio hits of all time. The song "Thamasamenthe Varuvan" was selected by Naushad Ali as one of the few of his favourite songs when he visited Baburaj Music Academy in 1988. "Thamasamenthe Varuvan" is also regarded as one of the most loved songs in Malayalam music history. It was voted the "Best Song in Malayalam" by Malayala Manorama in a special issue published as part of 50th anniversary of formation of Kerala state.

No.	Song	Singers	Lyrics	Length (m:ss)
1	"Anuraagamadhuchashakam"	S. Janaki	P. Bhaskaran	
2	"Arabikkadaloru"	K. J. Yesudas, P. Susheela	P. Bhaskaran	
3	"Ekaanthathayude"	Kamukara	P. Bhaskaran	
4	"Pottaatha Ponnin"	S. Janaki	P. Bhaskaran	
5	"Pottithakarnna Kinaavu"	S. Janaki	P. Bhaskaran	
6	"Thaamasamenthe Varuvan"	K. J. Yesudas	P. Bhaskaran	
7	"Vaasantha Panchami Naalil"	S. Janaki	P. Bhaskaran	

== Box office ==
The film was highest grossing Malayalam film at that time and a commercial success.

== Remake ==
A remake of the film titled Neelavelicham directed by Aashiq Abu released in April 2023.

== See also ==
- List of Malayalam horror films
