= Promise (2026 film) =

2026 Indian Tamil-language romantic drama film

- Directed by: Arunkumar Sekaran
- Written by: Arunkumar Sekaran
- Produced by: Narayana Nagaraj; Arunkumar Sekaran
- Starring: Arunkumar Sekaran; Nathiya Somu; Sujan Christopher; Karthik Smith; Gokula Krishnan; Dr. Ivin
- Cinematography: Akliesh; Vinothkumar BFT
- Music by: Saravana Deepan
- Production companies: Amman Arts Creations; Sangamithran Production
- Distributed by: Action Reaction Jenish; Casablanca Film Factory (OTT)
- Release date: June 26, 2026 (India)
- Country: India
- Language: Tamil

Promise is a 2026 Indian Tamil-language romantic drama film written and directed by Arunkumar Sekaran. The film is produced by Narayana Nagaraj and Arunkumar Sekaran under the banners Amman Arts Creations and Sangamithran Production. The film stars Arunkumar Sekaran, Nathiya Somu, Sujan Christopher, Karthik Smith, Gokula Krishnan, and Dr. Ivin.

== Cast ==
- Arunkumar Sekaran as Sangamithran
- Nathiya Somu as Lakshmi
- Sujan Christopher as Deva
- Karthik Smith as Lingeshwaran
- Gokula Krishnan
- Dr. Ivin as Dr. Anitha

== Production ==
The film was produced by Narayana Nagaraj and Arunkumar Sekaran under the banners Amman Arts Creations and Sangamithran Production. The cinematography was handled by Akliesh and Vinothkumar BFT, while editing was carried out by Sriram Vignesh. The music was composed by Saravana Deepan.

== Release and Reception ==
Promise was released in theatres on 26 June 2026 in India. Casablanca Film Factory handled the digital distribution, with the film beginning to stream on Amazon Prime Video from 5 October 2026.

Hindu Tamil Thisai wroted that "In a story that reminds us of the current situation of the 'HIV' epidemic, which has been forgotten by people like Corona, this 'Promise', which tells love, family life, and social mood with entertainment and seriousness, "

Maalai Malar crtic stated that " Written and directed by Arunkumar Sekaran, he has tried to portray the effects of alcoholism and the consequences of has..."

The Times of India stated that " The newcomers hold their own. "
