= Aa Ondu Notu =

- Directed by: Ratnatanay
- Written by: Ratnatanay
- Produced by: Jagadish MK; G Premnath
- Starring: Bala Rajwadi; Akshatha Pandavapura; G K Deshapande
- Cinematography: Ravivarma
- Edited by: Arjun Kittu
- Music by: Veer Samarth
- Production company: Friends Film Factory
- Distributed by: Casablanca Film Factory
- Release date: 13 March 2026
- Country: India
- Language: Kannada

Aa Ondu Notu is a 2026 Indian Kannada-language anthology film written and directed by Ratnatanay. The film stars Bala Rajwadi, Akshatha Pandavapura and Gouthamraj in the lead roles.

== Premise ==
An anthology film where a ₹2000 note passes from hand to hand, connecting multiple lives and stories from a widowed mother desperate to save her son to gamblers, lovers, outcasts, and strangers, unfolding raw, realistic moments that ultimately raise a haunting question about fate and survival.

== Cast ==
- Bala Rajwadi
- Akshatha Pandavapura
- G K Deshapande
- Gouthamraj
- Adithya Shetty
- Megha
- Silli Lalli Ananad
- Jagadeesh M K
- Ashwin Hassan

== Release ==
Casablanca Film Factory handled the digital distribution, with the film beginning to stream on Amazon Prime Video from 3 October 2026.

== Reception ==
A Sharadhaa of Cinema Express gave 2.5/5 stars and wrote "A slow-burn drama that finds beauty in small, human moments". Y Maheswara Reddy of the Bangalore Mirror, said that "Everything is connected; It is worth a watch for those who enjoy anthologies."
