= Neelavelicham =

Short story written by Vaikom Muhammad Basheer

"Neelavelicham" (transl. The Blue Light) is a Malyalam short story written by Vaikom Muhammad Basheer. Beginning with the introduction of one of the miracles of the narrator's life, the story is about the tender relationship that develops between a young writer who must live in a house notorious for being haunted and the ghost of a girl who is believed to haunt the house. The story is included in Basheer's collection Pavapettavarude Veshya (The Prostitute of the Poor, 1952).

The story became the basis of a film called Bhargavi Nilayam (1964) whose script was also written by Vaikom Muhammad Basheer. A film titled Neelavelicham, based on the original short story by Basheer released in April 2023.

== Story ==
=== The rental house ===
A writer is in search of a rental home. He finds a relatively cheap house by the end of his search. He discovers that the house is haunted only after he moved into it, paying two months of rent in advance. The name of the house was 'Bhargavi Nilayam'. The previous resident of the house called Bhargavi kills herself by jumping into the well behind the house due to a love failure. It is believed that Bhargavi used to give a hard time to the residents of the house, especially men.

=== Stay ===
Despite knowing all this, the writer decides to live there because he does not have other options. He talks to Bhargavi and narrates his problems. He tells her that even if she kills him, no one will be concerned. He tells her that he does not object to Bhargavi living there, and he requests her to let him live there peacefully.

The writer soon makes Bhargavi his partner in everything he is doing, including his writing and music. Their relation grew so much that it became normal for him.

=== 'The Magic' ===
One day, while he was writing an emotional story, the light goes off in the heavy wind. He goes in search of some oil to pour in his oil lamp. He couldn't find it though, so he comes home disappointed. When he came home, he was surprised to see that his room is now well lit. The oil lamp which did not have any oil now has a two-inch-high blue flame.

The writer is amused and confused about who lit the light and where the blue light came from. There the story ends.

== Publication ==
The story is included in the following collections:

- Vaikom Muhammad Basheer (1952). പാവപ്പെട്ടവരുടെ വേശ്യ [Pavappettavarude Veshya] (in Malayalam). Kottayam: S.P.C.S. ISBN 978-8-171-30493-6.
- Vaikom Muhammad Basheer (2003). നീലവെളിച്ചവും മറ്റു പ്രധാന കഥകളും [Neelavelichavum Mattu Pradhana Kathakalum] (in Malayalam). Kottayam: DC Books. ISBN 978-8-126-40560-2.

== Translations ==
The story is translated into English by V. Abdulla under the title "The Blue Light". There are other translations of the work, including those by O. V. Usha and C. P. A. Vasudevan, both under the same title. The translations are included in the following collections:

- Vaikom Muhammad Basheer (1983). The Love-Letter and Other Stories. Translated by V. Abdulla. India: Sangam Books. ISBN 978-0-861-31447-8.
- Vaikom Muhammad Basheer (1994). Poovan Banana and Other Stories. Translated by V. Abdulla. India: Orient Longman. ISBN 978-8-125-00323-6.
- Geeta Dharmarajan; Keerti Ramachandra, eds. (2000). "The Blue Light". The Bell and Other Stories: Unforgettable Short Fiction from Some of India's Master Storytellers. Translated by C. P. A. Vasudevan. New Delhi: Katha. ISBN 978-8-185-58672-4.
- David Davidar, ed. (2014). "The Blue Light". A Clutch of Indian Masterpieces: Extraordinary Short Stories from the 19th Century to the Present. Translated by O. V. Usha. New Delhi: Aleph. pp. 69–78. ISBN 978-9-382-27736-1.

== Adaptations ==
The story was made into a film titled Bhargavi Nilayam in 1964 when Vaikom Muhammad Basheer himself wrote the script for the film. It was the first film of director A. Vincent. Prem Nazir, Madhu and Vijaya Nirmala did the main characters in the film. The film had cinematography by P. Bhaskara Rao and by the music from M. S. Baburaj. This film became a blockbuster.

Soorya Krishnamoorthi did a light-and-sound show based on the story. Basheer had wanted Krishnamoorthi to write a second part for this show. A 2020 short film titled The Blue Light was an adaptation of the short story. The story also had theatrical adaptations.

A film titled Neelavelicham based on the original short story released in April 2023.
