= Kummatti =

Neighbourhood of Raahe, Finland

Coordinates: 64.67511°N 24.47849°E

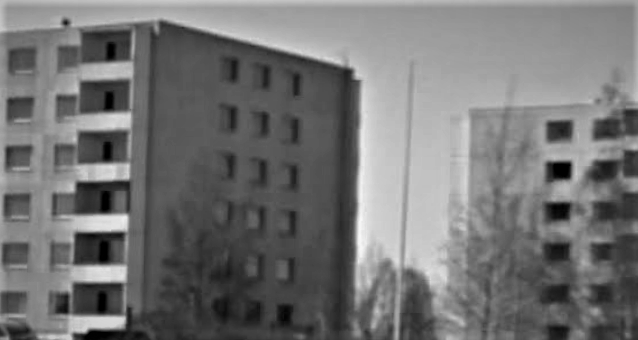
Apartment buildings in Kummatti

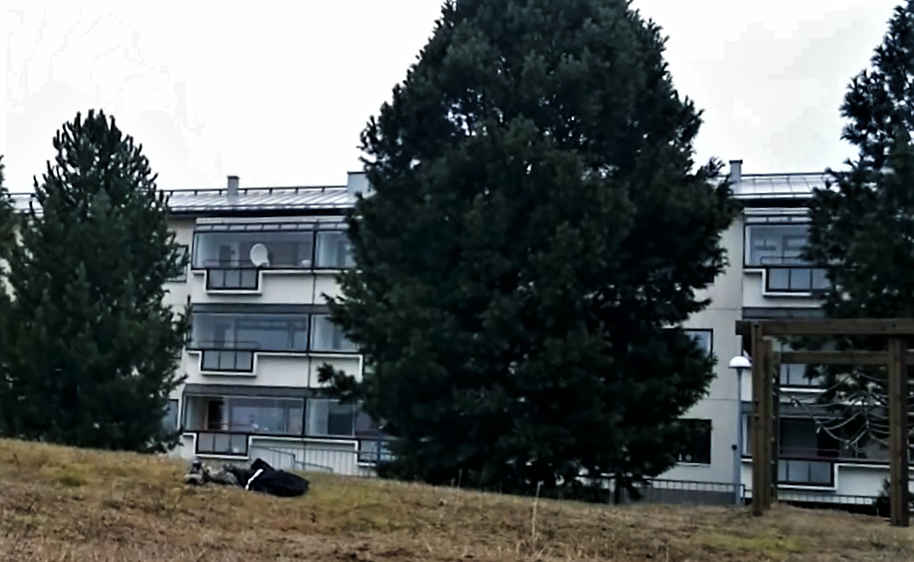
Kummatti in November 2012

Kummatti is a district in Raahe, Finland. It was countryside until the 1960s; the first apartment house was built in 1966. Kummatti gained a reputation as a problematic neighborhood and the housing standards were improved by repairing the oldest apartment buildings in the 2000s.

Local services include a Hesburger restaurant, a Teboil station, a vocational institute, an elementary school, a nursery school, a police station and a registry office.
