= Thariode =

Malayalam documentary film

- Directed by: Nirmal Baby Varghese
- Written by: Nirmal Baby Varghese
- Produced by: Baby Chaithanya
- Cinematography: Midhun Eravil; Nirmal Baby Varghese
- Edited by: Nirmal Baby Varghese
- Music by: Owain Hoskins
- Production company: Casablanca Film Factory
- Release dates: 2021 (HIGA Festival); 11 June 2022 (Overseas); 29 September 2024 (India)
- Country: India
- Language: Malayalam

Thariode is a 2021 Malayalam-language documentary film directed by Nirmal Baby Varghese about the history of gold mining in Thariyode and its impact on the environment. The film also focuses other gold mining areas of Malabar on 19th century. The film includes interviews with figures such as historians K. K. N. Kurup, Mundakkayam Gopi, O K Johnny, and other native persons. The film produced by Baby Chaithanya and narrated by Aliyar.

== Plot ==
Thariode, tells the story of gold mining in Thariyode, one of the most ancient cities of the Malabar region, a long, narrow coastline on the southwestern shore line of the mainland Indian subcontinent. The film also charts the history of gold mining in other areas of Malabar (Thalappuzha, Devala, Nilagiri, Nilambur and Chaliyar) during the 19th century. The film analyses the impact that gold mining – still one of the dirtiest industries in the world – had on the development of the country, the local livelihoods and the environmental repercussions on nature and the territory. The film also discusses the current feasibility of gold mining in Thariode town, which was evacuated in order to create the reservoir for the Banasura Sagar Dam.

== Soundtrack ==
The original background score is composed by British composer Owain Hoskins.

== Release ==
Film started streaming on the American OTT platform Diverse Cinema from 11 June 2022. Started streaming on Amazon Prime Video from 23 September 2022. Also available for streaming on Plex TV. Film was uploaded on 29 September 2024 onto the Casablanca Film Factory's YouTube channel.

== Awards and accolades ==
=== Awards ===
Year	Awards	Category	Result	Ref(s)
2023	Aasha International Film Festival	Best Short Documentary	Won	
2021	Kerala State Television Award	Best Educational Programme	Won	
2021	Hollywood International Golden Age Festival	Best Documentary	Won	
2021	7th Art International Film Festival	Best of the best in Short Documentary	Won	
2021	7th Art International Film Festival	Best Director in the Documentary Short	Won	
2021	Reels International Short film festival	Jury Award	Won	
2021	Continental Film Awards	Best Asian Documentary Short	Finalist	
2021	iFilms International Short Film Festival	International Short Films	Semi-finalist	
2020	Košice International Monthly Film Festival	Best Trailer	Finalist	

=== Film festival official selections ===
Year	Film Festival	Ref(s)
2023	LAN Doc Fest	
2022	Independent Video Film Festival of Youtube Art Club	
2022	Festival del Cinema di Cefalù	
2022	One Earth Awards	
2021	Golden Tree International Documentary Film Festival	
2021	Lift-Off Global Network Sessions	
2021	Standalone Film Festival & Awards	

== Remake ==
On 28 June 2019, director Nirmal announced a fictionalization of Thariode, starring Australian-British actor Bill Hutchens. The cinematic remake is titled "Thariode: The Lost City", and also stars Roger Ward, Luing Andrews, Alexx O'Nell, Courtney Sanello, Amelie Leroy, and Brendan Byrne in supporting roles.

== See also ==
- List of Indian documentary films
- List of documentary films
