= Nirmal Baby Varghese =

Indian film director and CEO of Casablanca Film Factory

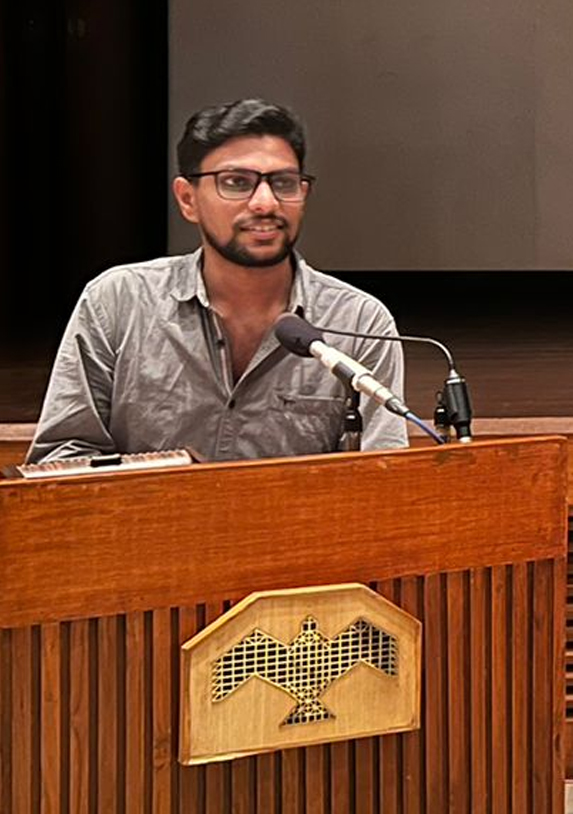
- Nirmal, during an event held at National Institute of Advanced Studies in August, 2022.
- Born: 13 January 1994 (age 32); Kavummannam, Wayanad, Kerala
- Occupations: Film director, script writer, editor
- Years active: 2016–present
- Title: CEO of Casablanca Film Factory
- Relatives: Baby Chaithanya (Sister)
- Awards: See awards and nominations

Nirmal Baby Varghese is an Indian film director in Malayalam. He is known for the documentary film Thariode. His feature directorial debut Vazhiye, was the first found footage movie in Malayalam. He is also script writer, film editor, and public relations officer. He is the younger brother of film producer Baby Chaithanya. He runs the independent film production company Casablanca Film Factory.

== Early life ==
Nirmal was born to Baby P K and Lilly Baby on 13 January 1994 at Kavummannam, in Wayanad district, in Kerala.

== Film career ==
In 2016, Nirmal directed two short films,Mirror of Reality and Mattam the Change, which were later released on Amazon Prime Video on 2020.

He began his career in Malayalam film industry in 2017 as the associate editor of the film Kalippu. He has also worked as a public relations officer for the films Moppala, Deira Diaries, Sarcas Circa 2020, and Salmon 3D.

He made his third directorial venture in Thariode, a documentary film about gold mining in Thariode. The film found critical acclaim in the festival circuit. He also announced a fictionalization of Thariode. He later announced the title of this cinematic remake as Thariode: The Lost City with a mainly foreign cast list including Bill Hutchens, Luing Andrews, Alexx O'Nell, Courtney Sanello, Amelie Leroy, Brendan Byrne and Roger Ward.

His feature directorial debut film Vazhiye is the first found footage movie in the Malayalam language. The film marked the debut of Hollywood music director Evan Evans in Indian cinema.

== Filmography ==
Year	Title	Credited as				Notes	Ref(s)
Year	Title	Director	Producer	Writer	Other	Notes	Ref(s)
2016	Mirror of Reality	Yes	Yes	Yes	Yes	Editor; Short film Later released on 20 March 2020 on Amazon Prime Video	
2016	Mattam the Change	Yes	Yes	Yes	Yes	Editor; Short film Later released on 22 March 2020 on Amazon Prime Video	
2019	Kalippu	No	No	No	Yes	Associate film editor	
2020	Moppala	No	No	No	Yes	Public relations officer	
2021	Deira Diaries	No	No	No	Yes	Public relations officer	
2021	Sarcas Circa 2020	No	No	No	Yes	Public relations officer	
2021	Salmon 3D	No	No	No	Yes	Public relations officer	
2021	Thariode	Yes	No	Yes	Yes	Editor and sound designer Documentary film	
2022	Vazhiye	Yes	No	Yes	Yes	Editor and sound designer First found footage film in Malayalam Language	
2024	Dreadful Chapters	Yes	Yes	Yes	Yes	Editor and sound designer Time-loop horror film	
2025	Alien Genesis: Beyond the Stars	Yes	Yes	Yes	Yes	English documentary film Streaming on Plex	
2025	Anthima Kshanagalu	Yes	Yes	Yes	Yes	Kannada film Streaming on BookMyShow Stream	
2026	Disease X: The Zombie Experiment	Yes	Yes	Yes	Yes	Editor and sound designer Zombie film	
TBA	Thariode: The Lost City	Yes	No	Yes	TBA	Announced (Based on the 2020 documentary film Thariode by himself)	

== Bibliography ==
- Thariode: History & Prospects Of Wayanad Gold Rush - String Productions, 2024. ISBN 978-93-6048-929-8

== Awards and accolades ==
Year	Award	Category	Work	Result	Ref(s)
2021	Kerala State Television Award	Best Educational Programme	Thariode	Won	

=== Film festival official selections ===
Year	Festival	Work	Notes	Ref(s)
2022	Toronto Indie Horror Fest	Vazhiye	Official Selection	
2022	Festival del Cinema di Cefalù	Thariode	Official Selection	
2022	One Earth Awards	Thariode	Official Selection	
2022	Clapperboard Golden Festival	Mirror of Reality	Official Selection	
2022	Clapperboard Golden Festival	Mattam the Change	Official Selection	
2021	Golden Tree International Documentary Film Festival	Thariode	Official Selection	
2021	Standalone Film Festival & Awards	Thariode	Official Selection	
2021	Lift-Off Global Network Sessions	Thariode	Official Selection	
2020	Košice International Monthly Film Festival	Thariode	Official Selection	
