= Sikkal Rajesh =

Sikkal Rajesh (born P. Rajesh on 12 December 1984) is an Indian actor and director who works predominantly in Tamil cinema. Born in Sikkal, Tamil Nadu, he adopted his hometown's name as a prefix when he entered the film industry.

== Career ==
Rajesh made his acting debut as an antagonist in the 2020 Tamil film Keelakadu, where he was credited as Sikkal Rajesh. He has since appeared in several Tamil films as a villain, including Patravan, Maayavan Vettai, and Iravin Vizhigal. In addition to acting, Rajesh ventured into direction with Patravan (2022). His second directorial venture, Iravin Vizhigal, is scheduled for release in 2025.

== Filmography ==
=== As actor ===
- Keelakadu
- Patravan
- Maayavan Vettai
- Iravin Vizhigal

=== As Director ===
- Patravan (2022)
- Iravin Vizhigal (2025)
