= Neelavelicham (film) =

2023 Indian Malayalam horror thriller film

- Theatrical release poster
- Directed by: Aashiq Abu
- Screenplay by: Original screenplay: Vaikom Muhammad Basheer; Additional screenplay: Hrishikesh Bhaskaran
- Based on: Neelavelicham by Vaikom Muhammad Basheer
- Produced by: Aashiq Abu; Rima Kallingal
- Starring: Tovino Thomas; Rima Kallingal; Roshan Mathew; Shine Tom Chacko
- Cinematography: Girish Gangadharan
- Edited by: V. Saajan
- Music by: Bijibal; Rex Vijayan; Original Composer: M. S. Baburaj
- Production company: OPM Cinemas
- Distributed by: OPM Cinemas
- Release date: 20 April 2023
- Country: India
- Language: Malayalam

Neelavelicham (transl. Blue Light) is a 2023 Indian Malayalam language horror thriller film (Note: Sources refer to the film as a "horror thriller" and "horror flick".) directed and co-produced by Aashiq Abu under his banner OPM Cinemas. The film stars Tovino Thomas, Rima Kallingal and Roshan Mathew in lead roles, with Shine Tom Chacko, Rajesh Madhavan, Abhiram Radhakrishnan and Pramod Veliyanad in supporting roles. The film is based on Vaikom Muhammad Basheer's renowned short story of the same name and is also a reboot of the 1964 blockbuster, Bhargavi Nilayam. The supplementary screenplay for the film was crafted by Hrishikesh Bhaskaran.

The film was released on 20 April 2023. The film became a box office bomb.

== Plot ==
The film opens with an unknown man entering the abandoned mansion Bhargavi Nilayam at midnight, only to flee in terror after encountering a ghostly figure.

A dispirited writer arrives at the mansion, located in a village, and notices the shocked reactions of the locals. Inside, he finds the house covered in dust, suggesting it has long been uninhabited, but decides to clean and stay there because he has nowhere else to go. Later, at a restaurant, the owner initially agrees to deliver meals to the mansion, but retracts the offer upon learning where the writer lives, claiming the lunch carrier is broken. The writer instead decides to eat at the restaurant.

That evening, the writer visits his friends, who explain the mansion's feared reputation. In the 1950s, a beautiful young woman named Bhargavi supposedly committed suicide by jumping into the well after a failed romance, and villagers believe her ghost still haunts the house. They also mention a man named Nanukuttan, who had loved her. Unfazed, the writer insists Bhargavi would not harm him and begins speaking to her ghost.

The following morning, villagers are astonished to find him alive. At the restaurant, the owner repeats the same story, and the writer reveals that he plans to write about Bhargavi. While working on the story, he hears noises from a storeroom and discovers a locked box. After forcing it open, he finds Bhargavi's photograph, a strand of curly hair wrapped in newspaper reporting a dead body found on a train, and a love letter signed by Nanukuttan. Investigating further, he comes to suspect that Bhargavi was murdered rather than driven to suicide. One night, after returning with kerosene for his lamp, he finds the mansion glowing with an intense blue light.

The narrative then shifts to the past. Bhargavi, a talented college student skilled in singing and dancing, asks her neighbour Sasi Kumar, a singer and sitar player, to accompany her at a college festival. Their successful performances together lead to a romance. Bhargavi's cousin Narayanan, who is infatuated with her and intends to marry her, grows jealous. After confirming her relationship with Sasi Kumar, he declares his wish to marry her, but Bhargavi refuses, saying she will marry no one but Sasi Kumar. Narayanan then resolves to eliminate his rival. He later sends Bhargavi a threatening letter, revealing that Narayanan and Nanukuttan are the same person.

When Sasi Kumar leaves for Lucknow because of political unrest in the village, Narayanan accompanies him on the train under the pretence of travelling to Delhi for a job interview. Claiming the fruit is from Bhargavi, he gives Sasi Kumar poisoned bananas. As Sasi Kumar struggles to breathe and asks for water, Narayanan refuses to help. Sasi Kumar dies on the train, though Narayanan later admits he also strangled him to ensure his death.

Bhargavi grows distressed as Sasi Kumar fails to return. Days later, Narayanan visits her alone and reveals that Sasi Kumar is dead. When Bhargavi insists that she belongs to Sasi Kumar even in death and can never marry Narayanan, he becomes enraged and throws her into the well, killing her.

Back in the present, the writer nears completion of his story. One night, while standing near the well and apparently speaking to Bhargavi's ghost, he is confronted by Narayanan, who confesses to murdering both Bhargavi and Sasi Kumar. Fearing exposure, Narayanan attacks the writer. During their violent struggle in the rain, they reach the well, where Narayanan nearly drowns him before slipping into the water himself. The writer attempts to save him with a rope, but Bhargavi's spirit drags Narayanan deeper into the well, causing him to die in the same manner as Bhargavi. A bright blue light emerges once more from the well, and the manuscript Narayanan had thrown into it rises back to the surface, suggesting Bhargavi's wish for the truth to be published.

== Cast ==
- Tovino Thomas as The writer (Vaikom Muhammad Basheer)
- Rima Kallingal as Bhargavi and the Ghost
- Shine Tom Chacko as M. Narayanan or 'M. N.' alias Nanukuttan
- Roshan Mathew as Sasikumar, Bhargavi's Love interest
- Rajesh Madhavan as Kuthiravattom Pappu
- Chemban Vinod Jose as Raviyettan
- Abhiram Radhakrishnan as Ramdas
- Pramod Veliyanad as Cheriya Parikkanni
- Jitin Puthenchery as Podiyan
- Pooja Mohanraj as Suma
- Uma K P as Bhargavi's Mother
- Devaki Bhagi as Latha
- James Eliya as the restaurant owner
- Jayaraj Kozhikode as the Postman
- Renji Kankol as Noolan Paramu
- Nisthar Sait as Noolan's Uncle
- Aami Thasneem as Paaru
- Rajesh Mohan as the Rickshaw Puller
- Akhil Raj VA as the Rickshaw Puller
- TV Renjith as the Rickshaw Puller

== Production ==
=== Development ===
Neelavelicham is the second remake of Vaikom Muhammad Basheer's short story of the same name, following the 1964 adaptation Bhargavi Nilayam. Director Aashiq said that he had read the original short story in his school library without initially knowing that it was the plot of Bhargavi Nilayam.

The film was announced in January 2021 by director Aashiq Abu on the 113th birth anniversary of legendary freedom fighter and Malayalam literary writer Vaikom Muhammad Basheer, along with a poster depicting an ancient Kerala-style home buried in the darkness and gently glowing with moonlight. The house is surrounded by trees and birds, yet upon closer inspection, the front yard is blood-splattered.

=== Casting ===
Prithviraj Sukumaran, Kunchacko Boban, Rima Kallingal, and Soubin Shahir were initially cast in the project. However, due to their hectic schedules and the COVID-19 outbreak in India, Prithviraj and Kunchacko opt out of the film. It was assumed that Asif Ali will take Kunchacko part. The identical poster was released in March 2022, but with a new cast of Tovino Thomas, Kallingal, Mathew, and Chacko. It was also stated that Shaiju Khalid was replaced by cinematographer Girish Gangadharan. This film marks Abu and Thomas fourth collaboration, following after Mayaanadhi (2017), Virus (2019) and Naradan (2022).

=== Filming ===
Due to the COVID-19 pandemic, the filming was delayed. The pooja and the principal photography of the film was kickstarted on 25 April 2022 in Pinarayi, Thalassery. The film was completed in mid-August 2022.

== Music ==
The original songs were composed by M. S. Baburaj. They were remade by Bijibal and Rex Vijayan.

Track listing
| No. | Title | Lyrics | Singer(s) | Length |
|---|---|---|---|---|
| 1. | "Anuraga Madhuchashakam" | P. Bhaskaran | K. S. Chithra | 3:17 |
| 2. | "Ekanthathayude Mahatheeram" | P. Bhaskaran | Shahabaz Aman | 4:50 |
| 3. | "Thamasamenthe Varuvan" | P Bhaskaran | Shahabaz Aman | 4:27 |
| 4. | "Pottithakarnna Kinavu" | P. Bhaskaran | K. S. Chithra | 4:12 |
| 5. | "Vasantha Panchami" | P. Bhaskaran | K. S. Chithra | 3:17 |
| Total length: | | | | 16:46 |

== Marketing ==
The makers published a teaser poster featuring Thomas in traditional costume with a white shirt, mundu, and briefcase in his hand, inspecting a dusty room in June 2022, along with the film's December 2022 release date. On 30 July 2022, the second poster of the film, showing Kallingal as Bhargavi in a dance posture with her robe spread like butterfly wings against the backdrop of a serene scenic area, was unveiled. On 1 November 2022, marked as Kerala Day, Mathew greeted his followers with a look poster depicting him seated on the porch outside the house, wearing a white dhoti and white vest, with spectacles.

== Reception ==
=== Critical reception ===
S. R. Praveen of The Hindu states that Neelavelicham successfully captures the essence of Vaikom Muhammad Basheer's original story. He notes that the film's strength lies in its focus on the relationship between the Writer and Bhargavi. He praised the high-quality sound design, visual effects, and performances of the cast. However, he states that the remake offers little new content for those familiar with the original film and also criticised Shine Tom Chacko's performance. He wrote: "Neelavelicham provides an absorbing sensory experience, but the question of the need for a remake remains. Its biggest contribution would be to make a whole generation watch the original landmark film."

Gopika Is of The Times of India rated the film 3.5/5 stars and states that Neelavelicham is a visually appealing remake of the classic film. She praises the movie's modern visual style and its ability to avoid unnecessary horror elements. She also highlights the grounded cast performances. While the film is considered "a visual treat", a few criticisms are that it lacks suspense, and the dialogue is "a little too cheesy". The review also commends the cinematography and soundtracks, noting they "do justice to the original."

Kirubhakar Purushothaman of The Indian Express rated the film 2.5/5 stars and stated that while Neelavelicham is "a well-executed adaptation", it ultimately "doesn't justify its own existence" due to the similarity to the original. He notes that the film appears dated in terms of plot and emotionality, as it's a "frame-by-frame remake" of the 1964 classic film. He wrote that the film "doesn't do much other than remind the current generation of the existence of such a classic story."

Lakshmi Priya of The News Minute states that Neelavelicham is "a visually stunning remake" that doesn't update the story. She notes that the film is a respectful tribute that benefits from modern technology, cinematography, and music. The review also notes that while the lead actors, Tovino Thomas and Rima Kallingal, are endearing, they sometimes struggle with the dated dialogue. She wrote: "For all its charm, Neelavelicham makes no effort to advance or modernise the original plot."

Princy Alexander of Onmanorama states that Neelavelicham is a "charming" adaptation that pays tribute to its original story. She praises the film for its "stunning" visuals and music, its successful blending of romantic and horror elements. She notes that the film's first half lacks depth, especially in the writer's monologues. She felt that Tovino Thomas's performance as the writer was not as strong as Madhu's in the original, but commended Rima Kallingal, Shine Tom Chacko, and Roshan Mathew for their roles. She further states that the film is not a "perfect retelling".

Anna MM Vetticad of Firstpost rated the film 3.5/5 stars and describes Neelavelicham's success lies in its mesmeric visuals and imagery rather than its plot. She mentions that the film is a competently made and visually inventive reimagining that relies on technological advancements to bring the story to life. She wrote: "It is an enchanting reboot of Basheer's quaint tale."

Sajin Shrijith of The New Indian Express rated the film 3.5/5 stars and praises the audio-visual creativity, cinematography and the fitting cast. He also notes that the film improves on the original by using subtle humor and effectively conveying the style of the author's writing. Overall, the film is seen as a simple, efficient, and immersive experience. He wrote: "Not all those films had stories with depth, but they more than made up for it through enchanting imagery. I would say the same for Neelavelicham too. It’s, for me, an immersive experience done right. Simple, yet efficient."

== Controversies ==
In March 2023, music composer M. S. Baburaj's daughter sent a legal notice to Aashiq Abu and Bijibal against them using Baburaj's song from Bhargavi Nilayam in Neelavelicham. She complained that the remade versions of Baburaj's songs present in the movie had been used without prior permission and were made in such a way that destroy the uniqueness and essence of the original versions.
