= Kalippu =

2019 Malayalam film

- Film poster
- Directed by: Jessen Joseph
- Written by: Jessen Joseph
- Produced by: High Mastcinemas
- Starring: Bala Singh; Kalasala Babu; Shalil Kallur; Ambika Mohan
- Cinematography: Johnsy Abhilash
- Edited by: Aneesh Kumar
- Music by: Amarnath; Anaz Sainudeen
- Production company: High Mastcinemas
- Distributed by: Highmast Cinemas
- Release date: 10 May 2019
- Running time: 130 minutes
- Country: India
- Language: Malayalam

Kalippu is a 2019 Indian Malayalam-language action thriller film written and directed by Jessen Joseph. The film was producer under the banner of High Mastcinemas. The film features Tamil film actor Bala Singh, Kalasala Babu, Shalil Kallur, Ambika Mohan, Jeffin and Anaz Sainudeen.

== Plot ==
Kalippu is a film bound with the stories of 2 groups in choola colony. The film is about a group of youngsters who act for the common people who were denied of justice. This film moves through all the injustice that is happening in our society.

== Cast ==
- Bala Singh as Beeran
- Kalasala Babu
- Shalil Kallur
- Ambika Mohan as Shantha
- Gopika Mohandas
- Jeffin
- Anaz Sainudeen
- Arun Shaji
- Shameer Ravuthar
- Abhijith
- Shobhi Thilakan
- Sajan Palluruthy
- Bindu Aneesh

== Music ==
The film score is composed by Amarnath and Anaz Sainudeen. The song "Vidaran Kothikkum Matrayil" was composed by AmarNath. The other two songs, "Chembazhak" and "Manushya Nee", were thus composed by Anaz Sainudeen.

=== Track listing ===
Kalippu (Original Motion Picture Soundtrack)
No.	Title	Lyrics	Singer(s)	Length
1.	"Chembazhak"	Sunil G cherukadavu	Madhu Balakrishnan, Shaina Shajahan (female)	3:19
2.	"Manushya Nee"	Jessen joseph	Hesham Abdul Wahab	3:08
3.	"Vidaran Kothikkum Matrayil"	Jessen Joseph	Rajalekshmi R S	3:51

== Release ==
Kalippu was released in India on 10 May 2019.

=== Critical reception ===
The Times of India rated 1.5 out of 5 and wrote it "Kalippu is a poorly made movie that masquerades as a social drama with numerous messages".
