= Evan Evans (film composer) =

American film score composer

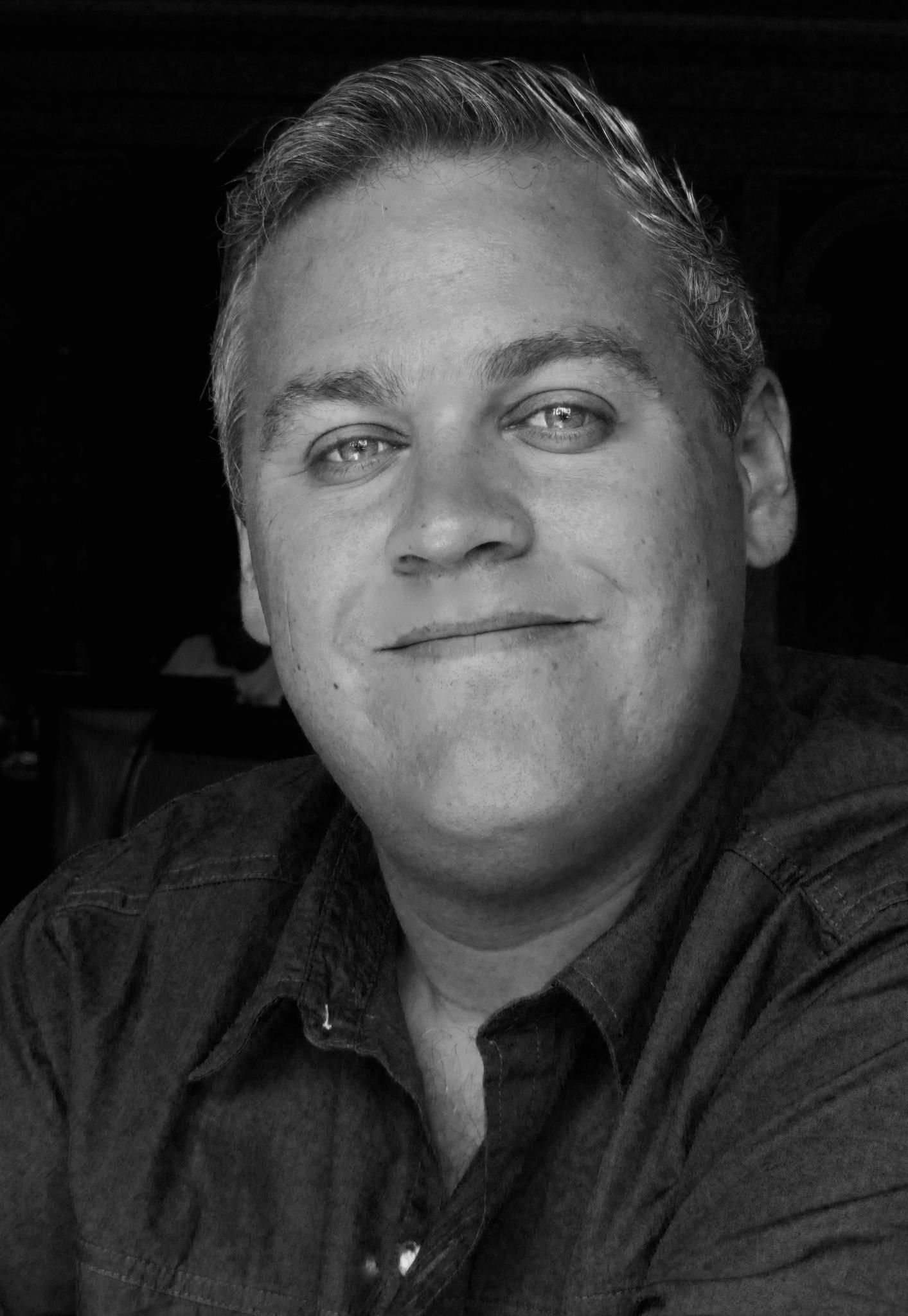
- Evan Evans

Background information
- Born: Evan Edward Evans; September 13, 1975 (age 51); Bergen County, New Jersey
- Genres: Jazz, contemporary
- Occupation: Composer
- Instrument: Piano

Evan Edward Evans (born September 13, 1975 in Bergen County, New Jersey) is an American film score composer. He is the son of jazz pianist Bill Evans.

He attended University of California, Los Angeles and Nadia Boulanger Institute in Paris. He apprenticed with several important entertainment industry personalities, including Argentinian film composer, concert composer and pianist Lalo Schifrin.

He generally composes for independent films.

In 1999 he founded the record label, E3 Records; E3 is named after his three initials.

Evans is also a semi-professional poker player and is the author of several works offering winning tips.

== Family ==
Evans married composer Michele Rene in May 1999; as of 2011, they had three children. In 2024, their son Jaden released an album of Bill Evans covers.

He has one step-sister, Maxine.

== Filmography ==
- Joe Joe Angel & the Dead Guy (1997)
- Coyote (1997)
- Killers (1997)
- Something Between Us (short) (1999)
- Crimson Wings (short) (1999)
- A Table for One (1999)
- NewsBreak (2000)
- TripFall (2000)
- Future Murder (2000)
- Firestorm Rising (2001)
- Miss Wonton (2001)
- Crawl Space (short) (2001)
- Altered Species (2001)
- The Keeper (2002)
- Until Death (2002)
- Killers 2: The Beast (video) (2002)
- Revelation (2002)
- Hunting Humans (video) (2002)
- Crave (2003)
- American Almanacs: A Living History (video documentary) (2003)
- Pizza: The Movie (2004)
- Evilution (short) (2004)
- Bollywood and Vine (video) (2004)
- Hoboken Hollow (2006)
- Under Surveillance (2006)
- Blacklist: Recovering the Life of Canada Lee (documentary) (2008)
- Jack Rio (2008)
- MARy (2008)
- Skeletons in the Desert (2008)
- The Poker Club (2008)
- Vegan Love (short) (2009)
- Never Surrender (2009)
- Playing in Darkness (short) (2009)
- Changing Hands (2010)
- The Bay (TV series) (2010–11)
- Programming the Nation? (documentary) (2011)
- Night of the Templar (2011)
- War Flowers (2011)
- You're Nobody 'til Somebody Kills You (2011)
- The Southside (2012)
- The Gauntlet (2012)
- Gambit (2017)
- Gambit: Play for Keeps (2020)
- Vazhiye (2021)
