= Kuttiyadi saddle dam =

Concrete dam in Kerala, India

- Country: India
- Opening date: 2004

Dam and spillways
- Type of dam: Concrete gravity
- Length: 121.0

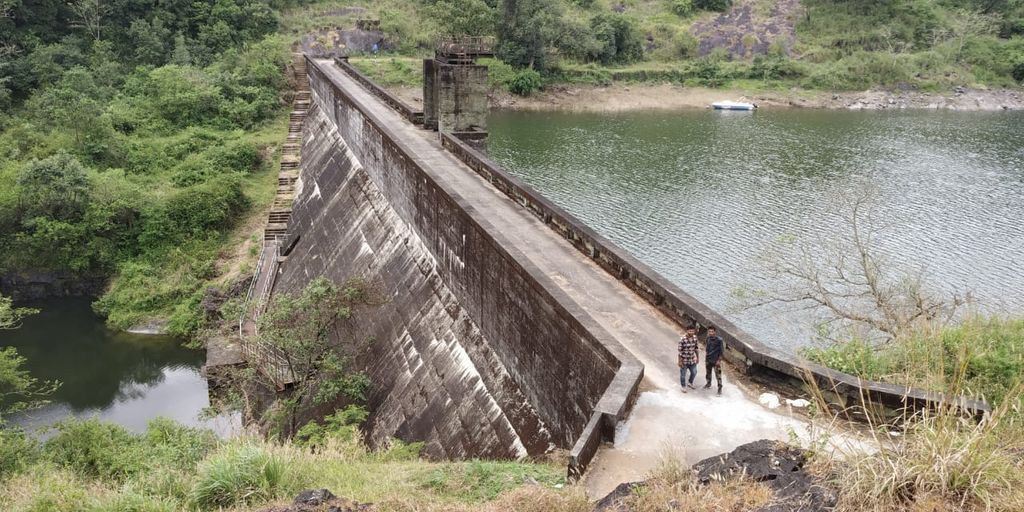
kuttiyadi Saddle Dam

Kuttiyadi Saddle Dam (Malayalam:കുറ്റ്യാടി തടയണ) is a concrete gravity dam built across Karamanathodu river which is a tributary of Kabani river in Padinjarathara village of Wayanad district in Kerala, India. It is one of the six dams created as part of Kuttiyadi Augmentation scheme which augments the Banasurasagar reservoir. The dam was built and is maintained by Kerala State Electricity Board.

The Kuttiyadi Augmentation Scheme comprises a main dam known as Banasurasagar Dam, an earth fill dam and a concrete gravity spillway dam and six saddle dams namely, a) Kosani ( Earth fill dam) 13.8 m high b) Near Kottagiri ( Earth fill dam) 11.0 m high c) Kottagiri ( Earth fill dam) 14.5 m high d) Kuttiyadi ( Concrete dam) 16.5 m high e) Nayamoola ( Earth fill dam) 3.5 m high f) Manjoora ( Earth fill dam) 4.0 m high. All the dams, except Kuttiady saddle, are earth fill dams. The Kuttiyadi saddle dam is a concrete dam. The spillway is located adjacent to the main dam at the right bank of the original river course. The water spread area at FRL / MWL is 12.77 km2. The catchment area of Banasurasagar Dam is 61.44 km2.

== Specifications ==
- Location Latitude:11⁰35’56”N
- Longitude:75⁰55’09”E
- Panchayath Padinjarathara
- Village Padinjarathara
- District Wayanad
- River Basin Kabani
- River Karamanthodu
- Release from Dam to river Kakkayam reservoir
- Taluk through which release flows Koyilandy
- Spillway Not provided
- Year of completion 2004
- Name of Project Kuttiady Augmentation Scheme
- Type of Project Multi purpose

Dam Features

- Type of Dam : Concrete gravity
- Classification MH ( Medium Height)
- Maximum Water Level (MWL) EL 775.60 metres (2,544.6 ft)
- Full Reservoir Level ( FRL) EL 775.60 metres (2,544.6 ft)
- Storage at FRL 209.25 Mm3
- Height from deepest foundation 16.50 metres (54.1 ft)
- Length 121.0 metres (397.0 ft)
- Crest Level Nil
- River / Irrigation Outlet 1No. circular, 2.5m dia
- Officers in charge & phone No. Executive Engineer, Dam Safety Division No. V, Thariode
  - Assistant Executive Engineer, Dam Safety Sub Division
- Installed capacity of the Project 231.75 MW
- Project Identification Code ( PIC) : KL29MH0048

== Reservoir ==
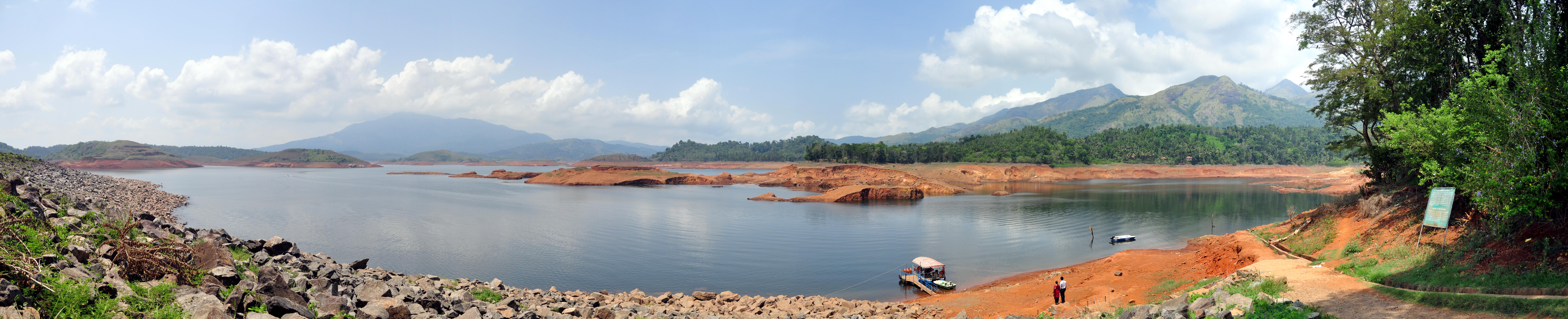
Kutyadi Augmentation Reservoir

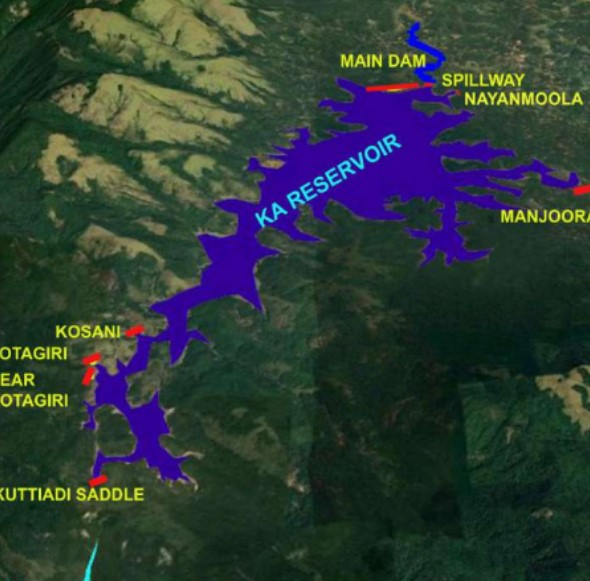
Kutyadi Augmentation Reservoir layout

The Gross Storage of Kuttiyadi Augmentation (Banasura sagar) Reservoir is 209 Mm3 and live storage 185 Mm3. The water stored in the reservoir is diverted to the reservoir of Kuttiyadi Hydro Electric Project through an interconnecting tunnel. The sill level of diversion tunnel at inlet is 750.83 m. The size and shape of tunnel is varying. It is varying from 2.35 m dia. circular lined tunnel for a length of 890m &2.85 m D-shaped unlined tunnel for a length of 3873 m. Maximum diversion is11.6 m3/s. The diverted water is used for power generation from Kuttiyadi Power Station. FRL of the reservoir is 775.60 m. Top level of dam is 778.50 m. There are four radial gates, each of size 10.97 m x 9.20 m. Crest level of spillway is 767.00 m. Spillway capacity is 1664 m3/s. One lower level outlet is provided in the spillway structure at750.75 m of size 1.10 m X 1.75 m to release irrigation requirement.
