= Manjoora Saddle Dam =

Earthen dam in Kerala, India

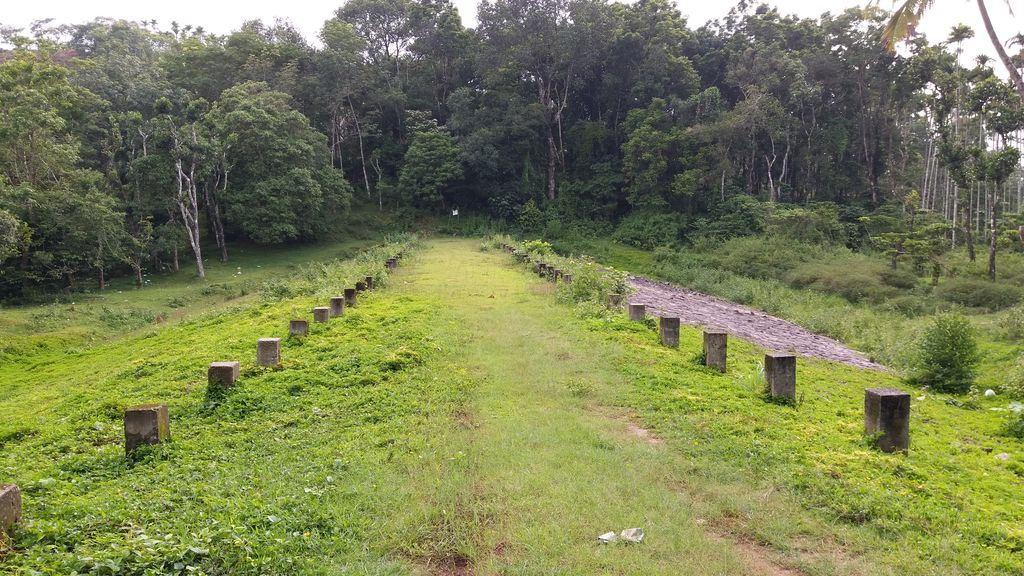
Manjoora Saddle Dam

Manjoora Saddle dam (Malayalam:മാഞ്ഞൂര തടയണ) is an earthen dam constructed across Karamanthode, which is a tributary of Kabani River in Padinjarathara Panjayath of Wayanad district in Kerala, India. It is one of the six saddle dams of Banasura sagar reservoir built as oart of the Kuttiyadi Augmentation scheme.

The Kuttiyadi Augmentation Scheme comprises a main dam known as Banasurasagar Dam, an earth-fill dam, and a concrete gravity spillway dam, and six saddle dams:

- Kosani, earth-fill, 13.8 metres (45 ft) high
- Near Kottagiri, earth-fill, 11.0 metres (36.1 ft) high
- Kottagiri, earth-fill, 14.5 metres (48 ft) high
- Kuttiyadi, concrete, 16.5 metres (54 ft) high
- Nayamoola, earth-fill, 3.5 metres (11 ft) high
- Manjoora, earth-fill, 4.0 metres (13.1 ft) high.

All the dams, except Kuttiady saddle, are earth-fill dams. The Kuttiyadi saddle dam is a concrete dam. The spillway is located adjacent to the main dam at the right bank of the original river course. The water spread area at FRL / MWL is 12.77 km^{2} . The catchment area of Banasurasagar Dam is 61.44 km^{2}.

== Specifications ==
- Coordinates: 11.6457°N 75.9787°E
- Panchayath: Padinjarathara
- Village: Padinjarathara
- District: Wayanad
- River Basin: Kabani
- River: Karamanthodu
- Release from Dam to river: NA
- Year of completion: 2005
- Name of Project: Kuttiady Augmentation Scheme
- Purpose of Project: Hydro Power

Dam Features

- Type of Dam: Homogeneous earth fill
- Classification: Saddle dam
- Maximum Water Level (MWL): EL 775.60 m
- Full Reservoir Level (FRL): EL 775.60 m
- Storage at FRL: 209.25 Mm^{3}
- Height from deepest foundation: 4.0 metres (13.1 ft)
- Length: 74.0 metres (242.8 ft)
- Spillway: No spillway
- Crest Level: NA
- River Outlet: Nil
- Installed capacity of the Project: 231.75 MW
- Officers in charge & Phone No. Executive Engineer, Dam Safety Division No. V, Padinjarathara, PIN – 673122, Phone – 9446008415
- Project Identification Code (PIC): Nil
- Assistant Executive Engineer, Dam Safety Sub Division, Padinjarathara, PIN – 673122, Phone – 9496004480
- Manjoora is a saddle dam of Banasurasagar reservoir.

== Reservoir ==
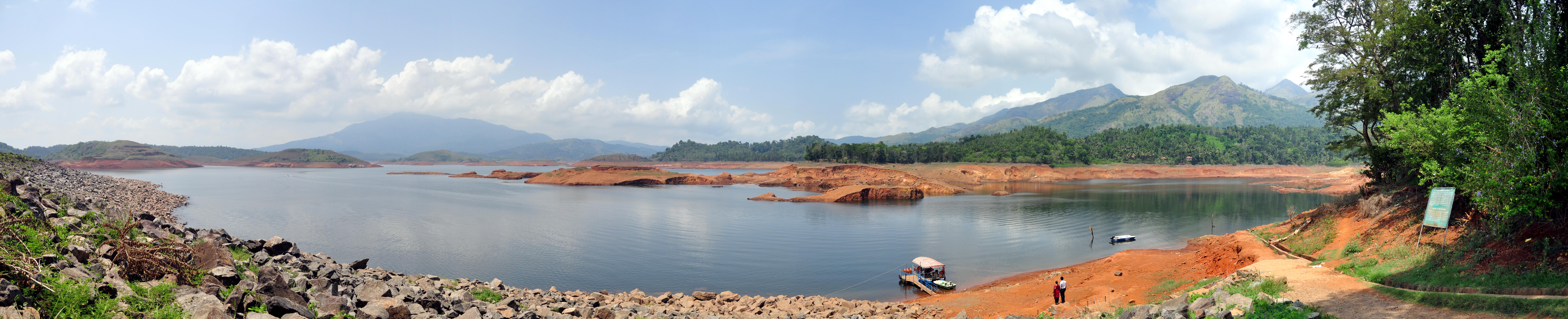
Kutyadi Augmentation Reservoir

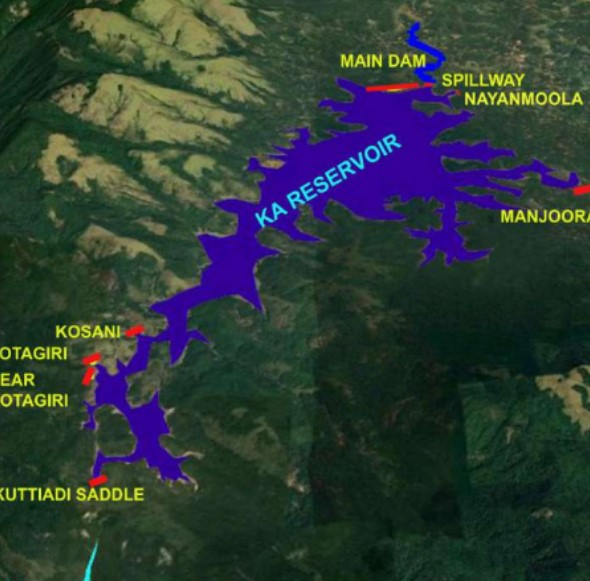
Kutyadi Augmentation Reservoir layout

The gross storage of Kuttiyadi Augmentation (Banasura sagar) Reservoir is 209.25 Mm^{3}; its live storage is 185 Mm^{3}. The water stored in the reservoir is diverted to the reservoir of Kuttiyadi Hydro Electric Project through an interconnecting tunnel. The sill level of the diversion tunnel at inlet is 750.83 m. The size and shape of the tunnel varies from a 2.35-meter-diameter circular lined tunnel for a length of 890 m to a 2.85-meter D-shaped unlined tunnel for a length of 3873 m. The maximum diversion is 11.6 m^{3}/s. The diverted water is used for power generation from Kuttiyadi Power Station. The FRL of the reservoir is 775.60 m. The top level of dam is 778.50 m. There are four radial gates, each of size 10.97 m × 9.20 m. The crest level of the spillway is 767 m. The spillway capacity is 1664 m^{3}/s. One lower-level outlet is provided in the spillway structure at 750.75 m of size 1.10 m × 1.75 m to release irrigation requirement.
