= Near Kottagiri Saddle Dam =

Earthen dam in Kerala, India

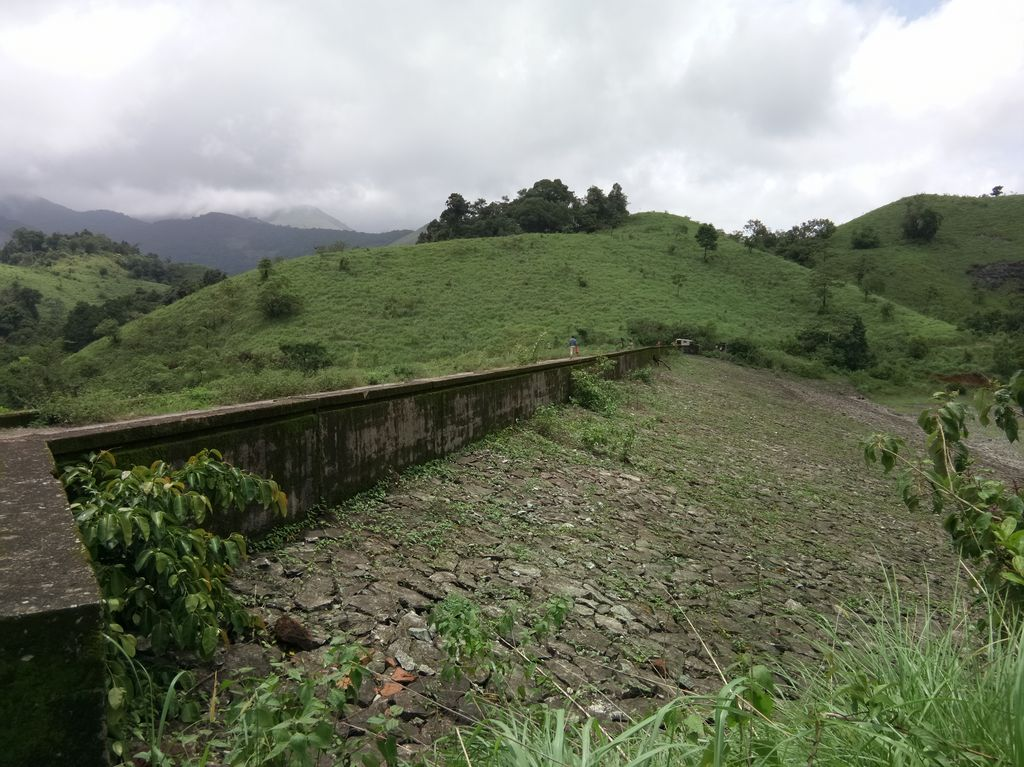

Near Kottagiri Saddle dam is an earthen dam constructed on Karamanthode which is a tributary of Kabani river at Thariyode, of Wayanad district in Kerala, India. It is a saddle dam of Banasura sagar Reservoir built as a part of Kuttiyadi Augmentation Scheme. The dam was constructed and is maintained by Kerala State Electricity Board. The height of the dam is 11.0 metres (36.1 ft) and the length is 110.0 metres (360.9 ft).

The Kuttiyadi Augmentation Scheme comprises a main dam known as Banasurasagar Dam, an earth fill dam and a concrete gravity spillway dam and six saddle dams namely, a) Kosani ( Earth fill dam) 13.8 m high b) Near Kottagiri ( Earth fill dam) 11.0 m high c) Kottagiri ( Earth fill dam) 14.5 m high d) Kuttiyadi ( Concrete dam) 16.5 m high e) Nayamoola ( Earth fill dam) 3.5 m high f) Manjoora ( Earth fill dam) 4.0 m high. All the dams, except Kuttiady saddle, are earth fill dams. The Kuttiyadi saddle dam is a concrete dam. The spillway is located adjacent to the main dam at the right bank of the original river course. The water spread area at FRL / MWL is 12.77 km^{2.}. The catchment area of Banasurasagar Dam is 61.44 km^{2.}.

== Specifications ==
Dam/Weir: Near Kottagiri Saddle Dam
Location	Latitude:11⁰36’44”N Longitude:75⁰55’00”E	Dam Features	
	Type of Dam	Homogeneous rolled earth fill	
Panchayath	Thariode	Classification	LH ( Low Height)
Village	Thariode	Maximum Water Level (MWL)	EL 775.60 metres (2,544.6 ft)
District	Wayanad	Full Reservoir Level ( FRL)	EL 775.60 metres (2,544.6 ft)
River Basin	Kabani	Storage at FRL	209.25 Mm3
River	Karamanthodu	Height from deepest foundation	11.0 metres (36.1 ft)
Release from Dam to river	NA	Length	110.0 metres (360.9 ft)
Taluk through which release flows	NA	Spillway	No spillway
Year of completion	2004	Crest Level	NA
Name of Project	Kuttiady Augmentation Scheme	River Outlet	Nil
Purpose of Project	Multi purpose	Officers in charge & Phone No.	Executive Engineer, Dam Safety Division No. V, Thariode, PIN- 673122 Phone – 9446008415
Installed capacity of the Project	231.75 MW	Assistant Executive Engineer, Dam Safety Sub Division, Thariode PIN- 673122 Phone- 9496004480	
Project Identification Code ( PIC)	KL29LH0055	Assistant Engineer, Dam Safety Section, Thariode PIN- 673122 Phone – 9496005761	
Near Kottagiri is a saddle dam of Banasurasagar reservoir.

== Reservoir ==
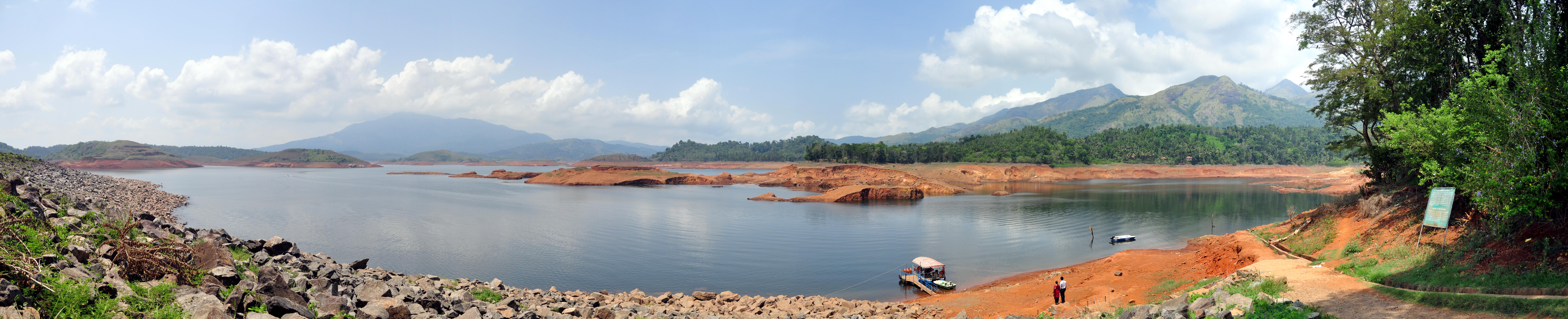
Kutyadi Augmentation Reservoir

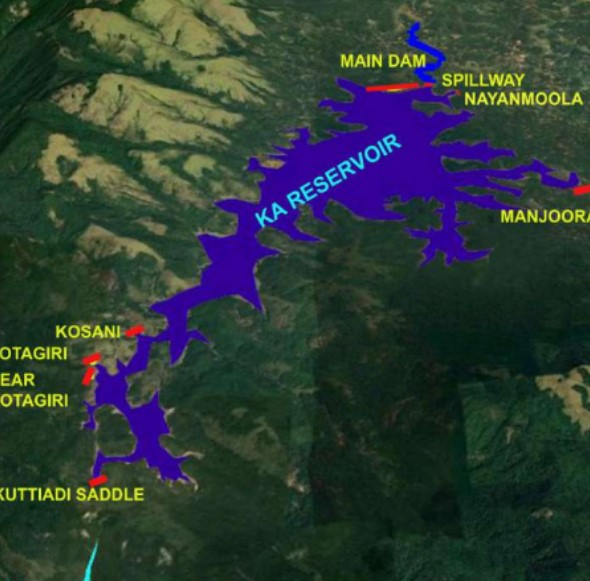
Kutyadi Reservoir

The Gross Storage of Kuttiyadi Augmentation (Banasura sagar) Reservoir is 209 Mm3 and live storage 185 Mm3. The water stored in the reservoir is diverted to the reservoir of Kuttiyadi Hydro Electric Project through an interconnecting tunnel. The sill level of diversion tunnel at inlet is 750.83 m. The size and shape of tunnel is varying. It is varying from 2.35 m dia. circular lined tunnel for a length of 890m &2.85 m D-shaped unlined tunnel for a length of 3873 m. Maximum diversion is11.6 m3/s. The diverted water is used for power generation from Kuttiyadi Power Station. FRL of the reservoir is 775.60 m. Top level of dam is 778.50 m. There are four radial gates, each of size 10.97 m x 9.20 m. Crest level of spillway is 767.00 m. Spillway capacity is 1664 m3/s. One lower level outlet is provided in the spillway structure at750.75 m of size 1.10 m X 1.75 m to release irrigation requirement.
