= Nayanmoola Saddle Dam =

Earthen dam in Kerala, India

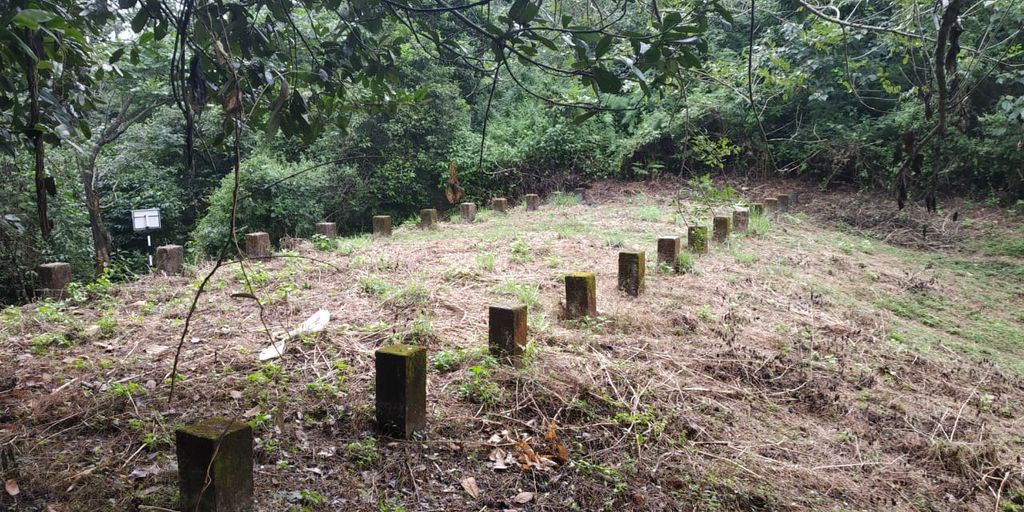
Nayamoola Saddle Dam

Nayanmoola Saddle dam (Malayalam: നായൻമൂല തടയണ) is an earthen dam constructed across Karamanthode at Padinjarathara Panjayath of Wayanad district in Kerala, India. It is a saddle dam of Banasura sagar reservoir built as a part of the Kuttiyadi Augmentation scheme. The dam has a height of 3.5 metres (11 ft) and a length of 24.0 metres (78.7 ft)

The Kuttiyadi Augmentation Scheme comprises a main dam known as Banasurasagar Dam, an earth fill dam and a concrete gravity spillway dam and six saddle dams namely, a) Kosani (Earth fill dam) 13.8 metres (45 ft) high b) Near Kottagiri (Earth fill dam) 11.0 metres (36.1 ft) high c) Kottagiri (Earth fill dam) 14.5 metres (48 ft) high d) Kuttiyadi (Concrete dam) 16.5 metres (54 ft) high e) Nayanmoola (Earth fill dam) 3.5 metres (11 ft) high f) Manjoora (Earth fill dam) 4.0 metres (13.1 ft) high. All the dams, except Kuttiady saddle, are earth fill dams. The Kuttiyadi saddle dam is a concrete dam. The spillway is located adjacent to the main dam at the right bank of the original river course. The water spread area at FRL / MWL is 12.77 km2. The catchment area of Nayanmoola Dam is 61.44 km2.

== Specifications ==
- Latitude :11⁰40’13.92”N *Longitude:75⁰57’45.6”E
- Panchayath: Padinjarathara
- Village : Padinjarathara
- District : Wayanad
- River Basin : Kabani
- River : Karamanthodu
- Release from Dam to river : NA
- Taluk through which release flows : NA
- Year of completion : 2005
- Name of Project : Kuttiady Augmentation Scheme
- Purpose of Project : Diversion

DAM FEATURES

- Type of Dam : Homogeneous rolled earth fill
- Classification : Saddle Dam
- Maximum Water Level (MWL) : EL 775.60 m
- Full Reservoir Level ( FRL) : EL 775.60 m
- Storage at FRL : 209.25 Mm3
- Height from deepest foundation : 3.5 m
- Length : 24.0 m
- Spillway : No spillway
- Crest Level : NA
- River Outlet : Nil
- Installed capacity of the Project : 231.75 MW
- Officers in charge & phone No.Executive Engineer, Dam Safety Division No. V, Padinjarathara, PIN- 673122 Phone – 9446008415Project Identification Code (PIC) : Nil
- Assistant Executive Engineer, Dam Safety Sub Division, Padinjarathara PIN- 673122 Phone- 9496004480
- Nayamoola is a saddle dam of Banasurasagar reservoir

== Reservoir ==
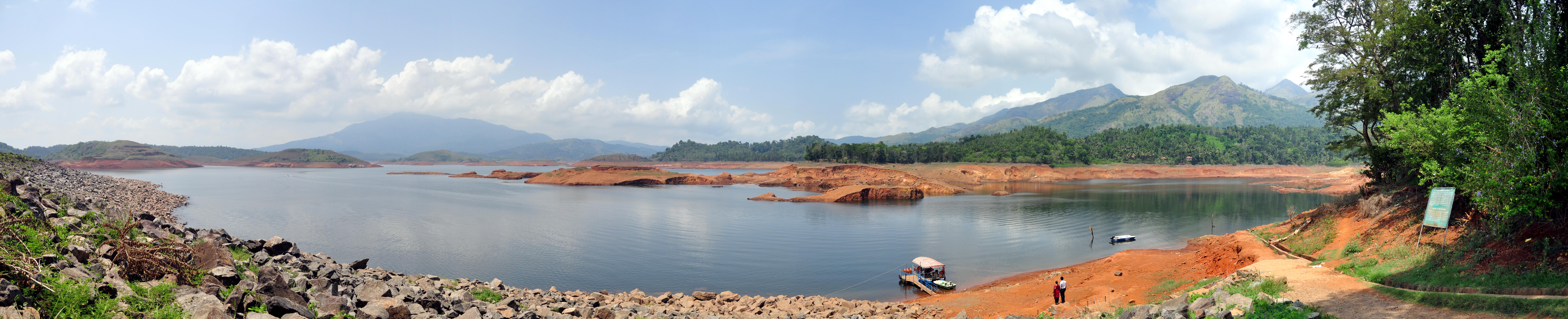
Kutyadi Augmentation Reservoir

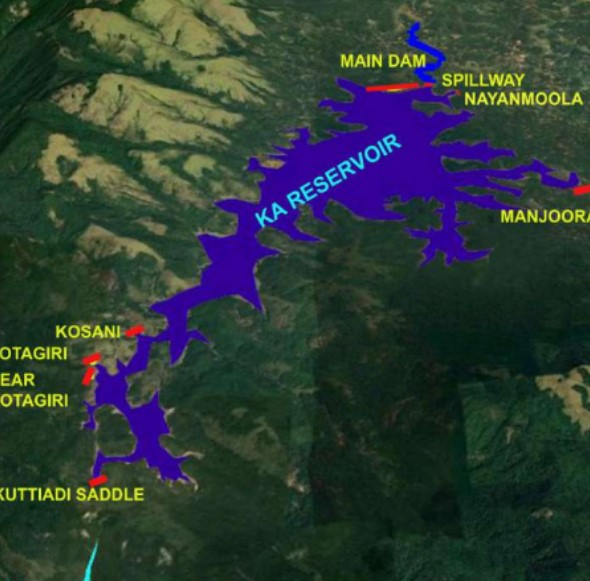
Kutyadi Augmentation Reservoir layout

The gross storage of Kuttiyadi Augmentation (Banasura sagar) Reservoir is 209 Mm^{3} and live storage 185 Mm^{3}. The water stored in the reservoir is diverted to the reservoir of Kuttiyadi Hydro Electric Project through an interconnecting tunnel. The sill level of diversion tunnel at inlet is 750.83 m. The size and shape of tunnel is varying. It is varying from 2.35 m dia. circular lined tunnel for a length of 890 m and 2.85 m D-shaped unlined tunnel for a length of 3873 m. Maximum diversion is11.6 m^{3}/s. The diverted water is used for power generation from Kuttiyadi Power Station. FRL of the reservoir is 775.60 m. Top level of dam is 778.50 m. There are four radial gates, each of size 10.97 m x 9.20 m. Crest level of spillway is 767.00 m. Spillway capacity is 1664 m^{3}/s. One lower level outlet is provided in the spillway structure at 750.75 m of size 1.10 m X 1.75 m to release irrigation requirement.
