= Kottagiri Saddle Dam =

Earthen Dam in Kerala, India

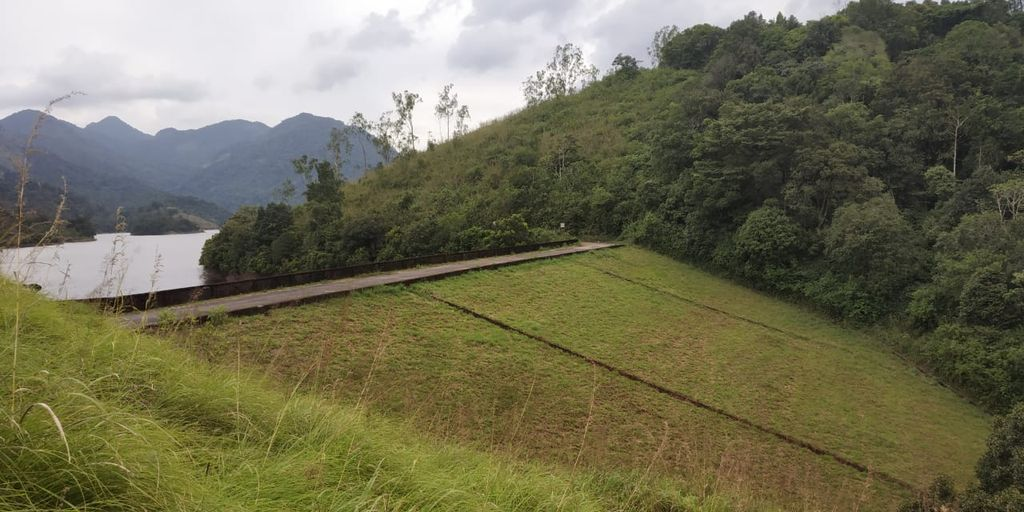

Kottagiri Saddle dam (Malayalam:കോട്ടഗിരി തടയണ) is an earthen dam constructed across Karamanthodu which is a tributary of Kabani river at Thariyode village of Wayanad district in Kerala, India. It is a saddle dam of the Banasura sagar reservoir built as part of The Kuttiyadi Augmentatuin Scheme. The dam was constructed and is maintained by Kerala State Electricity Board.

The Kuttiyadi Augmentation Scheme comprises a main dam known as Banasurasagar Dam, an earth fill dam and a concrete gravity spillway dam and six saddle dams:

- Kosani – Earth fill dam – 13.8 m high
- Near Kottagiri – Earth fill dam – 11.0 m high
- Kottagiri – Earth fill dam – 14.5 m high
- Kuttiyadi – Concrete dam – 16.5 m high
- Nayamoola – Earth fill dam – 3.5 m high
- Manjoora – Earth fill dam – 4.0 m high

All the dams, except Kuttiady saddle, are earth fill dams. The Kuttiyadi saddle dam is a concrete dam. The spillway is located adjacent to the main dam at the right bank of the original river course. The water spread area at FRL / MWL is 12.77 km^{2.}. The catchment area of Banasurasagar Dam is 61.44 km^{2.}.

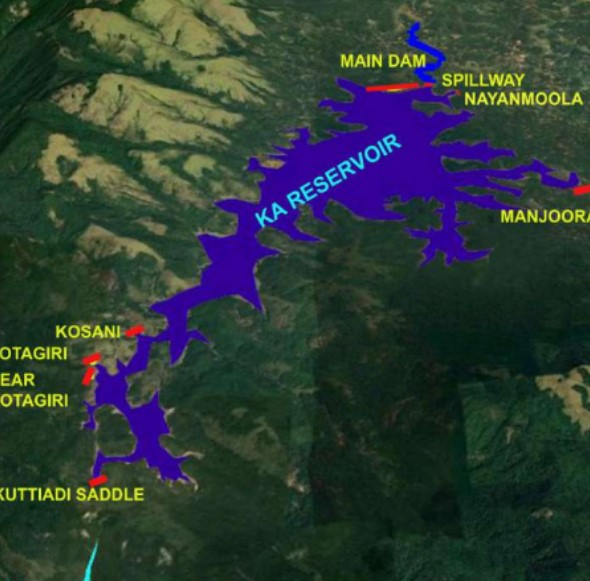
Kutyadi Reservoir layout

== Specifications ==
- LocationLatitude:11⁰36’53”N
- Longitude:75⁰54’58”E
- Panchayath : Thariode
- Village : Thariode
- District : Wayanad
- River Basin : Kabani
- River : Karamanthodu
- Release from Dam to river : NA
- Year of completion : 2004
- Name of Project : Kuttiady Augmentation Scheme
- Type of Project : Multi purpose

Dam Features

- Type of Dam : Homogeneous rolled earth fill
- ClassificationLH : ( Low Height)
- Maximum Water Level (MWL) : EL 775.60 m
- Full Reservoir Level ( FRL) : EL 775.60 m
- Storage at FRL : 209.25 Mm3
- Height from deepest foundation : 14.50 metres (47.6 ft)
- Length : 90.0 metres (295.3 ft)
- Spillway : No spillway
- Crest Level : NA
- River Outlet : Nil
- Officers in charge & phone No.Executive Engineer, Dam Safety Division No. V, Thariode, PIN- 673122 Phone – 9446008415
- Installed capacity of the Project : 231.75 MW
- Assistant Executive Engineer, Dam Safety Sub Division, Thariode PIN- 673122 Phone- 9496004480
- Project Identification Code ( PIC) : KL29LH0054
- Assistant Engineer, Dam Safety Section, Thariode PIN- 673122 Phone – 9496005761

== Reservoir ==
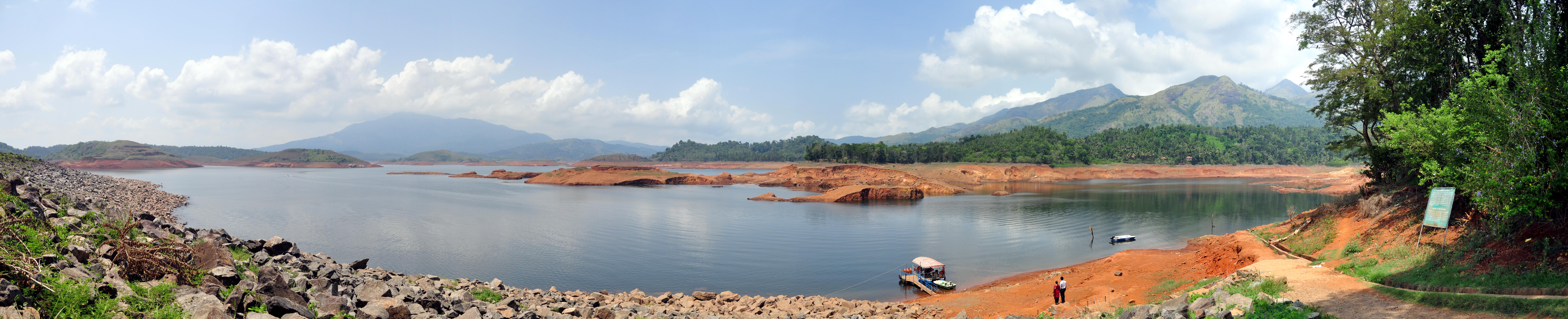
Kutyadi Augmentation Reservoir

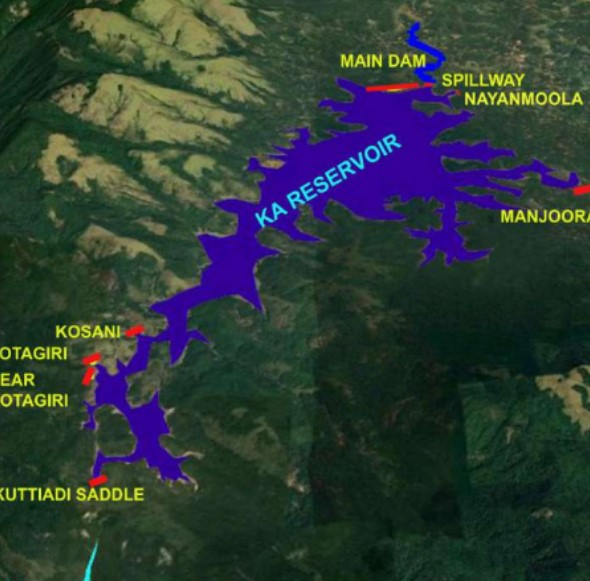
Kutyadi Reservoir

The gross storage of Kuttiyadi Augmentation (Banasura sagar) Reservoir is 209 Mm3 and live storage 185 Mm3. The water stored in the reservoir is diverted to the reservoir of Kuttiyadi Hydro Electric Project through an interconnecting tunnel. The sill level of diversion tunnel at inlet is 750.83 m. The size and shape of tunnel is varying. It is varying from 2.35 m dia. circular lined tunnel for a length of 890 m and 2.85 m D-shaped unlined tunnel for a length of 3873 m. Maximum diversion is11.6 m3/s. The diverted water is used for power generation from Kuttiyadi Power Station. FRL of the reservoir is 775.60 m. Top level of dam is 778.50 m. There are four radial gates, each of size 10.97 m x 9.20 m. Crest level of spillway is 767.00 m. Spillway capacity is 1664 m3/s. One lower level outlet is provided in the spillway structure at 750.75 m of size 1.10 m X 1.75 m to release irrigation requirement.
