= Kuppadithara =

- village
- Country: India
- State: Kerala
- District: Wayanad

Population (2011)
  - Total: 9,761

Languages
  - Official: Malayalam, English
- Time zone: UTC+5:30 (IST)
- PIN: 673122
- ISO 3166 code: IN-KL
- Vehicle registration: KL12

Kuppadithara is a village near Padinharethara in Wayanad district in the state of Kerala, India.

== Demographics ==
As of the 2011 India census, Kuppadithara had a population of 8839, with 4326 males and 4513 females.

== Transportation ==
Kuppadithara can be accessed from Padinjarathara or Kalpetta. The Periya ghat road connects Mananthavady to Kannur and Thalassery. The Thamarassery mountain road connects Calicut with Kalpetta. The Kuttiady mountain road connects Vatakara with Kalpetta and Mananthavady. The Palchuram mountain road connects Kannur and Iritty with Mananthavady. The road from Nilambur to Ooty is also connected to Wayanad through the village of Meppadi.

The nearest railway station is at Mysore and the nearest airports are Kozhikode International Airport-120 km, Bengaluru International Airport-290 km, and Kannur International Airport, 58 km.YSK എന്ന ക്ലബ് കേരളത്തിൽ തന്നെ അറിയപ്പെട്ട ക്ലബ്ബാണ്
