= Banasura Hill Resort =

- Interactive map of the Banasura Hill Resort area

General information
- Type: Rammed earth architecture
- Architectural style: Indigenous Sustainable architecture, Organic architecture
- Location: Wayanad, Kerala, India
- Coordinates: 11°42′49″N 75°55′23″E
- Elevation: 976 m (3,202 ft)
- Construction started: July 2008
- Completed: January 2010

Design and construction
- Architect: Eugene Pandala

Website
- www.banasura.com

Banasura Hill Resort is a nature resort in Wayanad District of North Kerala, India; located 37 kilometres (23 mi) away from Kalpetta, the district headquarters. It stands at an altitude of 3,200 feet (980 m) above sea level on a 35 acres (14 ha) plot amidst the mountains of the Western Ghats declared as one of the traditionally preserved sites in the world by UNESCO.

The resort seen against the backdrop of the Banasura Hill, from which it derives its name.

== Etymology ==
The resort is so named because it is located at the foot of the Banasura Hill which is the second highest mountain in Wayanad that often attracts climbers to attempt to reach the summit. Besides this, the Banasura Sagar Dam, which lies just 18 km from the resort and shares its architectural antecedents also had an influence in naming the resort.

== Architecture ==
The resort's architectural design follows a construction based on rammed earth. The various living structures within the resort complex is constructed using mud excavated from the very site where it stands on. The main building has an area of nearly 20,000 square foot spread over two floors, and is made entirely out of mud, with a roof of bamboo and coconut palm fronds.

BBC News considers it as a mud haven – India's only "earth" resort and possibly the largest of its kind in Asia.

== The idea behind Banasura ==
Rammed earth architecture was used for construction.

A considerable amount of research went in before deciding on the type of architecture to be used in construction. "Earth" architecture was chosen because it would cause the least amount of ecological damage while blending harmoniously with the micro environment around the site. "Earth" (mud) that is used for construction can be recycled indefinitely or left to disintegrate without causing any environmental degradation.

Research also threw up striking examples of large earthen structures that had withstood the test of time and survived for centuries. The Great Mosque of Djenné in Mali built in 1907, the Citadel of Rayen in Iran built during the Parthian rule (248 BC–224 AD); and the ancient city of Shibam in Yemen built in the 2nd century A.D are some such structures.

Inspired by these examples, rammed earth (or pise) was chosen as the architecture to be adopted for constructing the resort. This construction technique was developed in ancient China around 2,000 B.C and used predominantly to build protective walls around small settlements. The Great Wall of China is one of the best examples where rammed earth was used. Closer to the resort, the Banasura Sagar Dam, which is India’s largest earthen dam, and the second largest in Asia, also prompted adoption of this eco-friendly design.

== Size and challenges ==
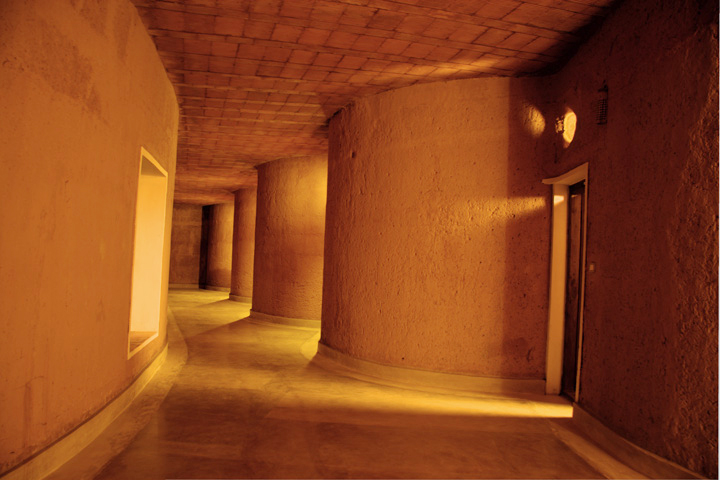
The corridor inside the main building.

Fairly large single-storied earthen structures are common in different parts of the world, but building a two-storied structure of such enormous proportions as that of the main building at the resort, was quite a challenge. Since the building was designed without any concrete pillars, extra attention had to be paid to load bearing and load balancing aspects to ensure stability.

Climatic conditions are a major concern while building earthen structures. Typically, earthen buildings are found in areas where the climate is dry and arid. Wayanad, where Banasura Hill Resort is located, has a tropical wet climate – also known as a tropical monsoon climate – with an annual average rainfall of well over 2,300mm. While the heavy monsoon rains are responsible for the tropical rain forests and the rich bio-diversity found in these parts, building a rammed colossal earth structure under such climatic conditions is a challenge. Despite this, construction of the main building was completed within 18 months.

== Indigenous sustainable architecture ==
Banasura Hill Resort makes optimal use of environmental resources. As it is built using mud; the structures of the resort gel seamlessly with the natural surroundings. The design itself contributes actively to energy conservation. The thick earthen walls provide thermal insulation, keeping the interiors cool during the day and warm and cozy during the night, obviating the need for air-conditioning. The ambience that the interiors of the earthen structures provide is one of cool comfort.

== Environmental conservation ==
Being an Eco Resort, Banasura Hill Resort has taken measures to conserve the ecological balance of the place and preserve its natural heritage and biodiversity. For example, Guadua bamboo saplings have been planted in and around the resort to create a bio-fencing. Its environmental benefits include regulating water levels, absorbing huge amounts of carbon dioxide from the atmosphere, producing oxygen, preventing soil erosion and conserving bio diversity. Also planted in thousands are seedlings of the highly aromatic Vetiver grass whose cluster roots run vertically like a mesh to a depth of almost 5m, effectively preventing soil erosion and arresting water run-off. These measures help to conserve the ecological balance of the place and preserve its natural heritage and biodiversity.

== Plantations at the resort ==
The resort stands in the middle of a Tea estate. Large areas have also been devoted to the cultivation of pepper, coffee and arecanut. Tall Rosewood and Eucalyptus trees are a common sight throughout the resort.
