= Karalad Lake =

Lake in Kerala, India

- Karlad Lake
- കറളാട് സമുദ്രം (Malayalam)
- Location within Kerala Location within India
- Coordinates: 11°39′02″N 75°58′54″E
- Surface area: 7 acres (2.8 ha)

Karlad Lake is located in Thariode, Wayanad. It is the third largest fresh water lake in Kerala and second largest lake in Wayanad after Pookode Lake. The lake is 3 km away from Banasura Sagar Dam.

== Attractions ==
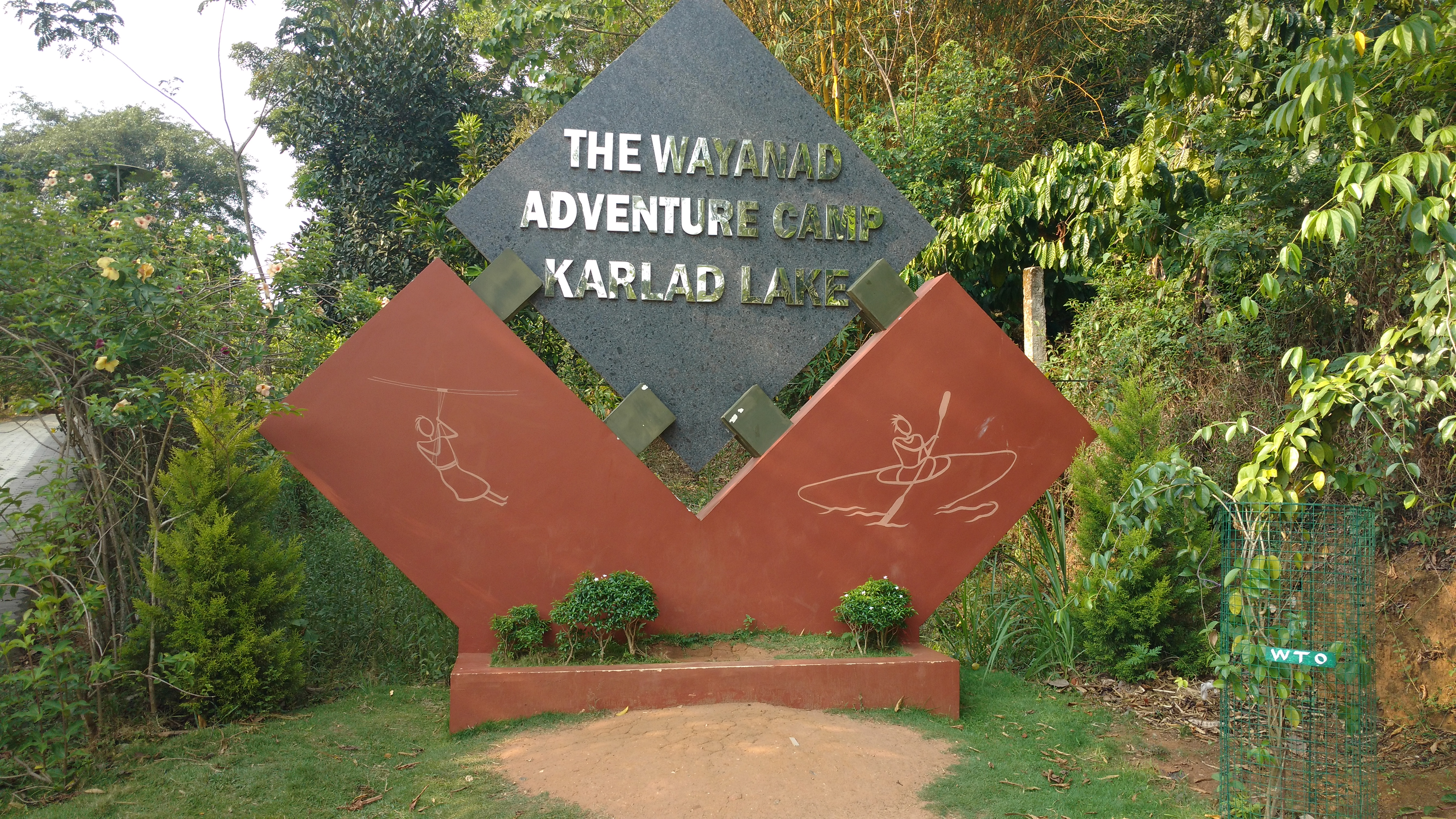
Wayanad Adventure Camp is an adventure sports location maintained by the DTPC.

Wayanad Adventure Camp on the lake is administered by District Tourism Promotion Councils (DTPC) Wayanad.

Ziplining, boating, kayaking, rock climbing, and Zorbing are among the tourist attractions. There is also a handicrafts and spices emporium. Corporate events are also held here along with tents and cottages for visitors.

== Gallery ==
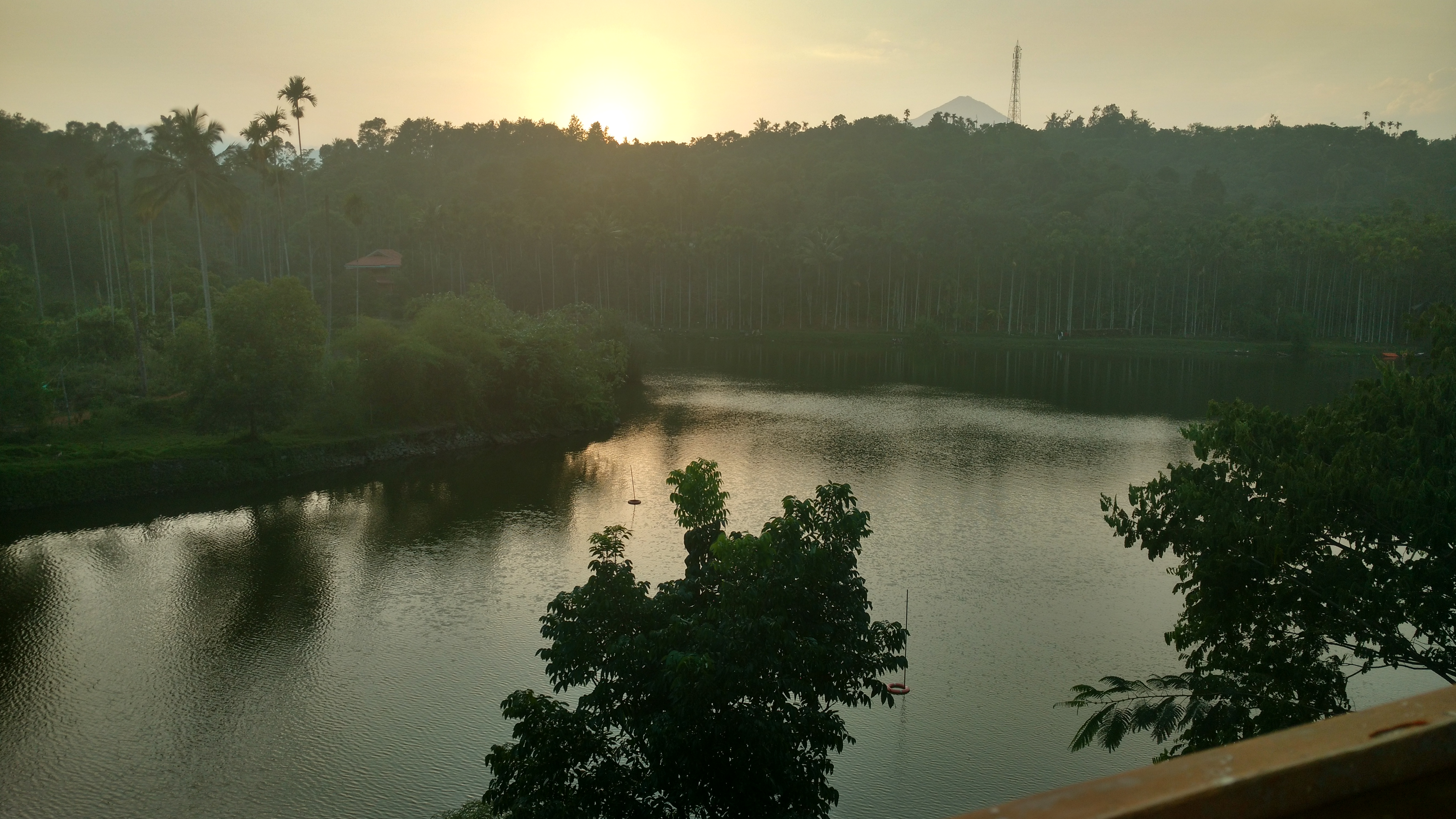

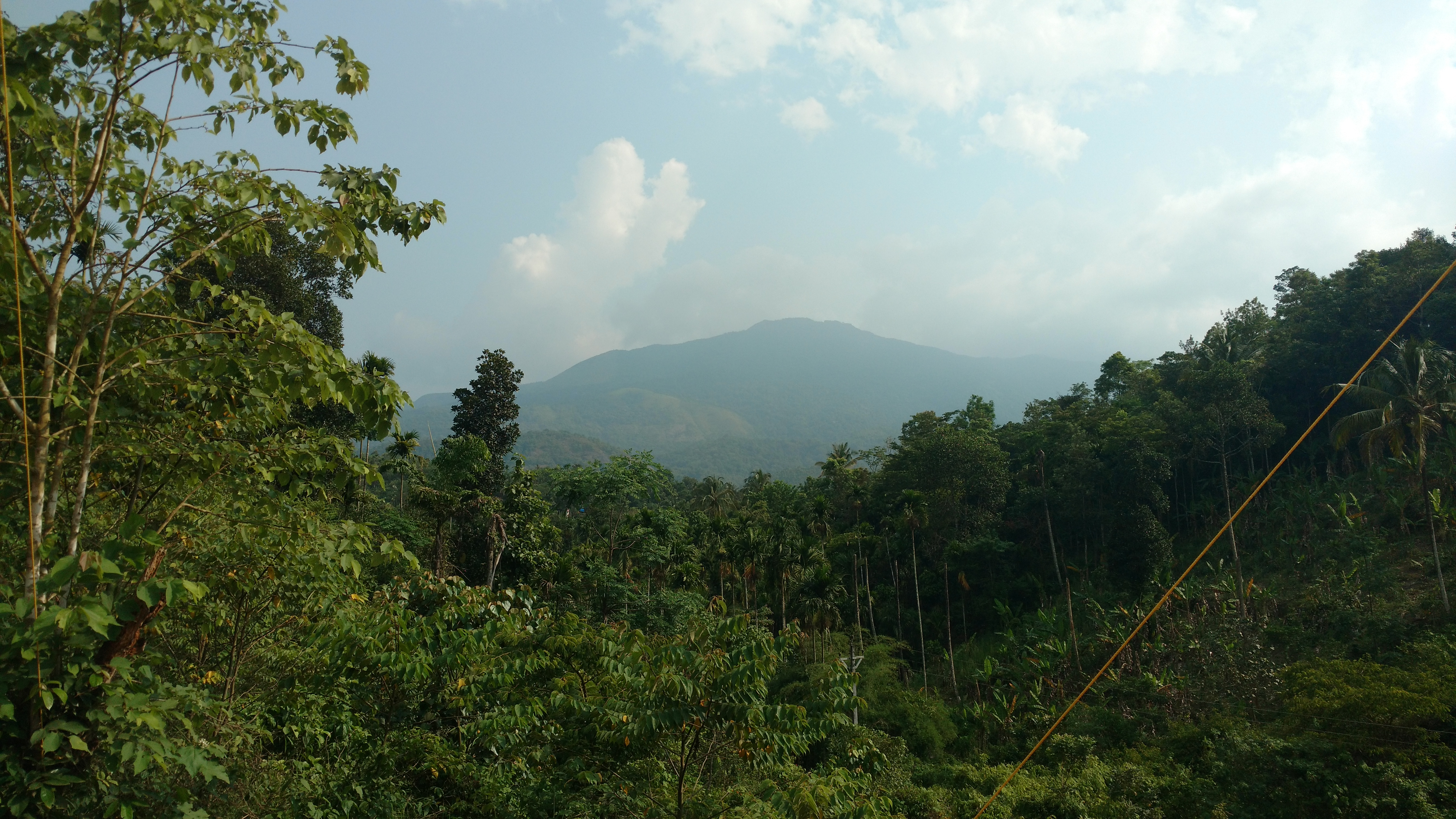

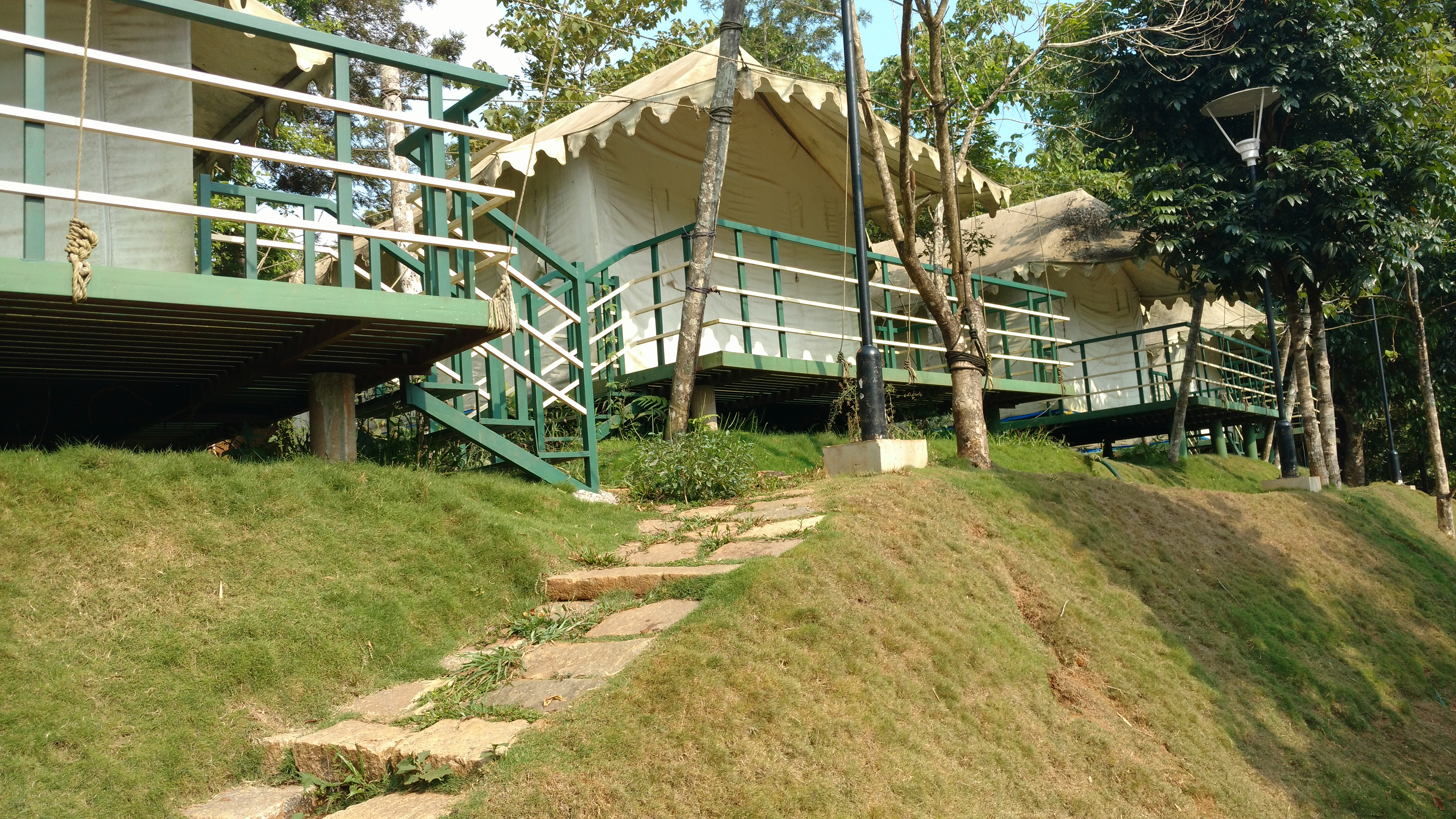
