= Thariyode =

- village
- Location in Kerala, India
- Country: India
- Talukas: Vythiri
- Time zone: UTC+5:30 (IST)
- PIN: 673122

Thariyode (also spelled Thariode) is a village near Padinjarathara in Wayanad district in the state of Kerala, India.

== Important Landmarks ==
- Banasura Sagar Dam – The Largest Earth Dam in India.
- Karalad Lake
- GLPS Thariode
- GHSS Thariode
- Nirmala HS Thariode
- GUPS Thariode
- Sree Paradhevatha Temple
- Lourdes Matha Church
- Kavummannam Juma Masjidh
- Louis Mount Psychiatric Hospital
- ST.JOHNS BELIEVERS EASTERN CHURCH CHENNALODE
- Mariyamman Temple 10th mail

== In popular culture ==
A documentary film called "Thariode", directed by Nirmal Baby Varghese and produced by Baby Chaithanya, narrates the story of gold mining in Thariode, one of the most ancient cities of the Malabar Region in British India. Director Nirmal is also planning a big-budget movie in that same setting. He also wrote a historical book, Thariode: History & Prospects Of Wayanad Gold Rush, about the gold mining history of this place.

== Notable people ==
- Nirmal Baby Varghese – Director
- Baby Chaithanya – Producer
