= Banasura Sagar Dam =

Dam in Padinjarathara, Wayanad, Kerala, India

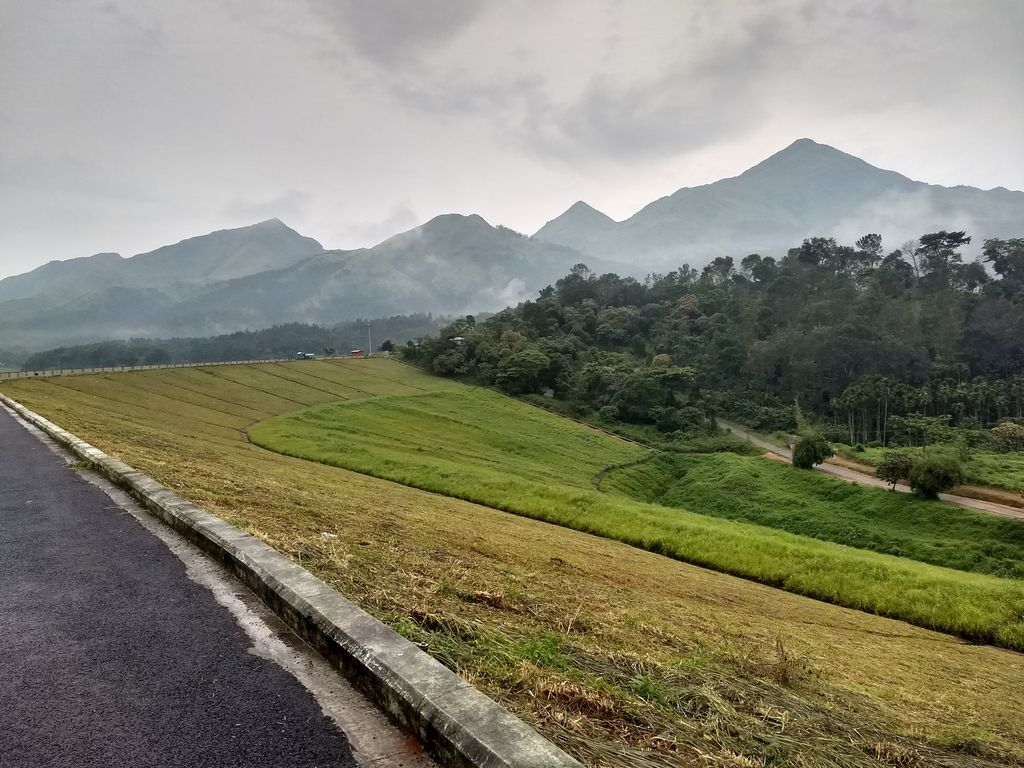
- Banasura Sagar Main Earthfill Dam

- Location in Kerala Location in India
- Official name: Padinjarathara Dam
- Country: India
- Location: Padinjarathara, Kerala
- Coordinates: 11°40′12″N 75°57′28″E
- Purpose: Multi-purpose
- Status: Operational
- Opening date: 2004
- Owner: Kerala State Electricity Board

Dam and spillways
- Impounds: Tributary of the Kabini River
- Height: 775 m (2,543 ft)
- Height (foundation): 38.5 m (126 ft)
- Length: 9.0 km (6 mi)
- Spillways: Nil

Reservoir
- Creates: Banasurasagar Reservoir
- Total capacity: 209,250,000 m^{3} (169,642 acre⋅ft)
- Catchment area: 61.44 km^{2} (24 mi^{2})
- Normal elevation: 775.60 m (2,545 ft)

Power Station
- Installed capacity: 231.75 MW

Banasura Sagar Dam, situated in Padinjarathara in Kerala is the largest earth dam in India and second largest dam in Asia. Banasura Dam is under the control of Padinjarathara KSEB Station. India's first operating floating solar power plant was established in Banasura Dam. The dam is surrounded by Banasura Hills. Dam impounds the Karamanathodu tributary of the Kabini River, is part of the Indian Banasurasagar Project consisting of a dam and a canal project started in 1979. The goal of the project is to support the Kakkayam Hydro electric power project and satisfy the demand for irrigation and drinking water in a region known to have water shortages in seasonal dry periods. The dam is also known as Kuttiyadi Augmentation Main Earthen Dam. The dam has a height of 38.5 metres (126 ft) and length of 776 metres (2,546 ft).

In the dam's reservoir there is a set of islands that were formed when the reservoir submerged the surrounding areas. The islands with the Banasura hills are in the background view. It is the largest earth dam in India and the second largest of its kind in Asia. The dam is made up of massive stacks of stones and boulders.

The Kuttiyadi Augmentation Scheme consists of a main dam known as Banasurasagar Dam, an earth fill dam and a concrete gravity spillway dam and six saddle dams:

- Kosani, an earth-fill dam 13.8 m high,
- Near Kottagiri, an earth-fill dam 11.0 m high,
- Kottagiri, an earth-fill dam 14.5 m high,
- Kuttiyadi, a concrete dam 16.5 m high,
- Nayanmoola, an earth-fill dam 3.5 m high, and
- Manjoora, an earth-fill dam 4.0 m high.

All the dams, except Kuttiady saddle, are earth-fill dams. The Kuttiyadi saddle dam is a concrete dam. The spillway is located adjacent to the main dam at the right bank of the original river course. The water spread area at FRL / MWL is 12.77 km^{2}. The catchment area of Banasurasagar Dam is 61.44 km^{2}.

== Specifications ==
- Coordinates: 11°40′12″N 75°57′28″E
- Panchayath: Padinjarathara
- Village: Padinjarathara
- District: Wayanad
- River Basin: Kabani
- River: Karamanthodu, a tributary of Kabani river
- Taluk through which release flows: Vythiri, Mananthavadi
- Year of completion: 2004
- Type of dam: Homogeneous rolled earth fill
- Classification: HH (High Height)
- Maximum Water Level (MWL): 775.60 m
- Full Reservoir Level (FRL): EL 775.60 m
- Storage at FRL: 209.25 Mm^{3}
- Height from deepest foundation: 38.5 m (Height from bed level)
- Length: 685.00 m
- Spillway: No spillway
- Installed capacity: 231.75 MW
- Project Identification Code (PIC): KL29HH0044

== Location ==
The Banasura Sagar Dam is located 2 km from Padinjarathara and 20 km from Kalpetta in Wayanad District of Kerala in the Western Ghats of India. It is the largest earthen dam in India and the second largest in Asia and a starting point for hikes into the surrounding mountains. It is an important tourist attraction. Banasura Sagar Dam is at the foot of the Banasura Hill.

== Spillway Dam ==
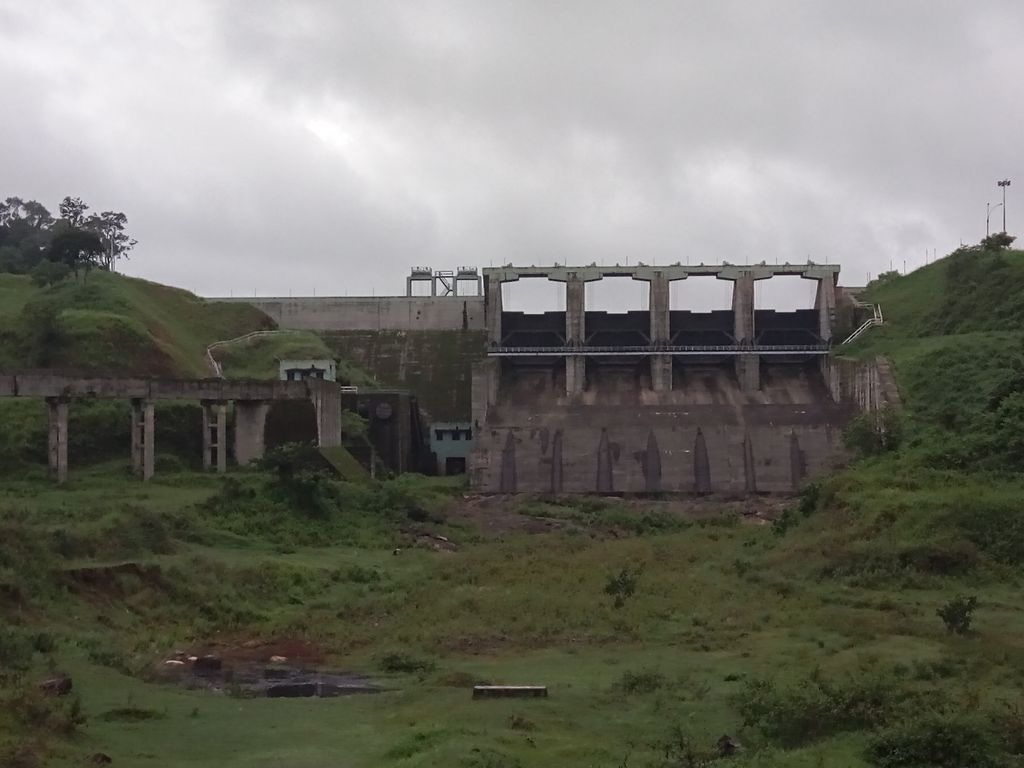
Spill way dam of Banasura sagar dam

Kuttiady Augmentation Spillway dam is a concrete dam with spillways for the Banasurasagar reservoir. The spillway dam is part of the Kuttiyadi Augmentation Scheme, which is located in Wayanad district. It aims at using water of the Karamanthodu River, a tributary of Kabani River. The Scheme consists of a main dam known as Banasurasagar Dam, an earth-fill dam, a concrete gravity spillway dam, and six saddle dams.

== Reservoir ==
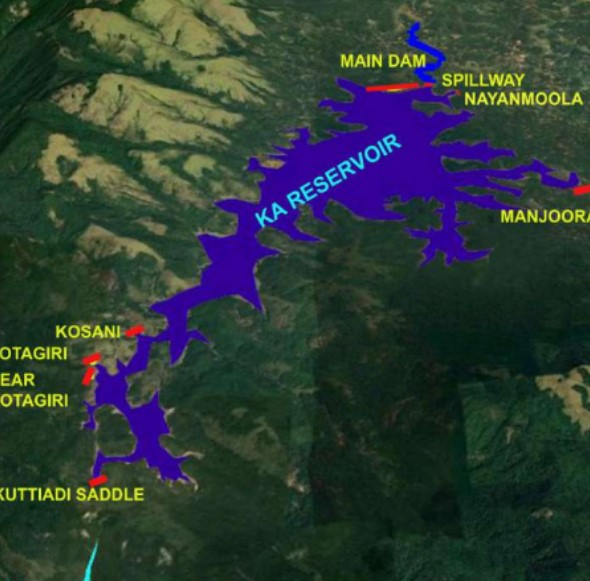
Kutyadi Reservoir layout

The gross storage of Kuttiyadi Augmentation (Banasura sagar) Reservoir is 209 Mm^{3}; its live storage is 185 Mm^{3}. The water stored in the reservoir is diverted to the reservoir of Kuttiyadi Hydro Electric Project through an interconnecting tunnel. The sill level of diversion tunnel at inlet is 750.83 m. The size and shape of tunnel is varying. For 809 meters of its length, it is a circular, lined tunnel 2.35 meters in diameter, and for 3873 meters it is a D-shaped unlined tunnel with a diameter of 2.85 meters. The maximum diversion is 11.6 m^{3}/s. The diverted water is used for power generation at Kuttiyadi Power Station. The elevation of the reservoir when full is 775.60 m. The top level of the dam is 778.50 m. There are four radial gates, each of size 10.97 m × 9.20 m. The crest level of the spillway is 767.00 m. The spillway capacity is 1664 m^{3}/s. One lower-level outlet is provided in the spillway structure at 750.75 m of size 1.10 m × 1.75 m to release water for irrigation.

== Etymology ==
The Banasura Sagar Dam is named after Banasura, the son of Mahabali who as per local Hindu mythological belief was a very respected king of Kerala.

== Tourism ==
The dam has become a popular tourist destination. Many people visit the place to go trekking at the Banasura Hill and speed boating at Banasura Sagar Dam. The Banasura Hill Resort, located about 20 km from the dam was rated as Asia's largest Earthen Resort by BBC.

== Gallery ==
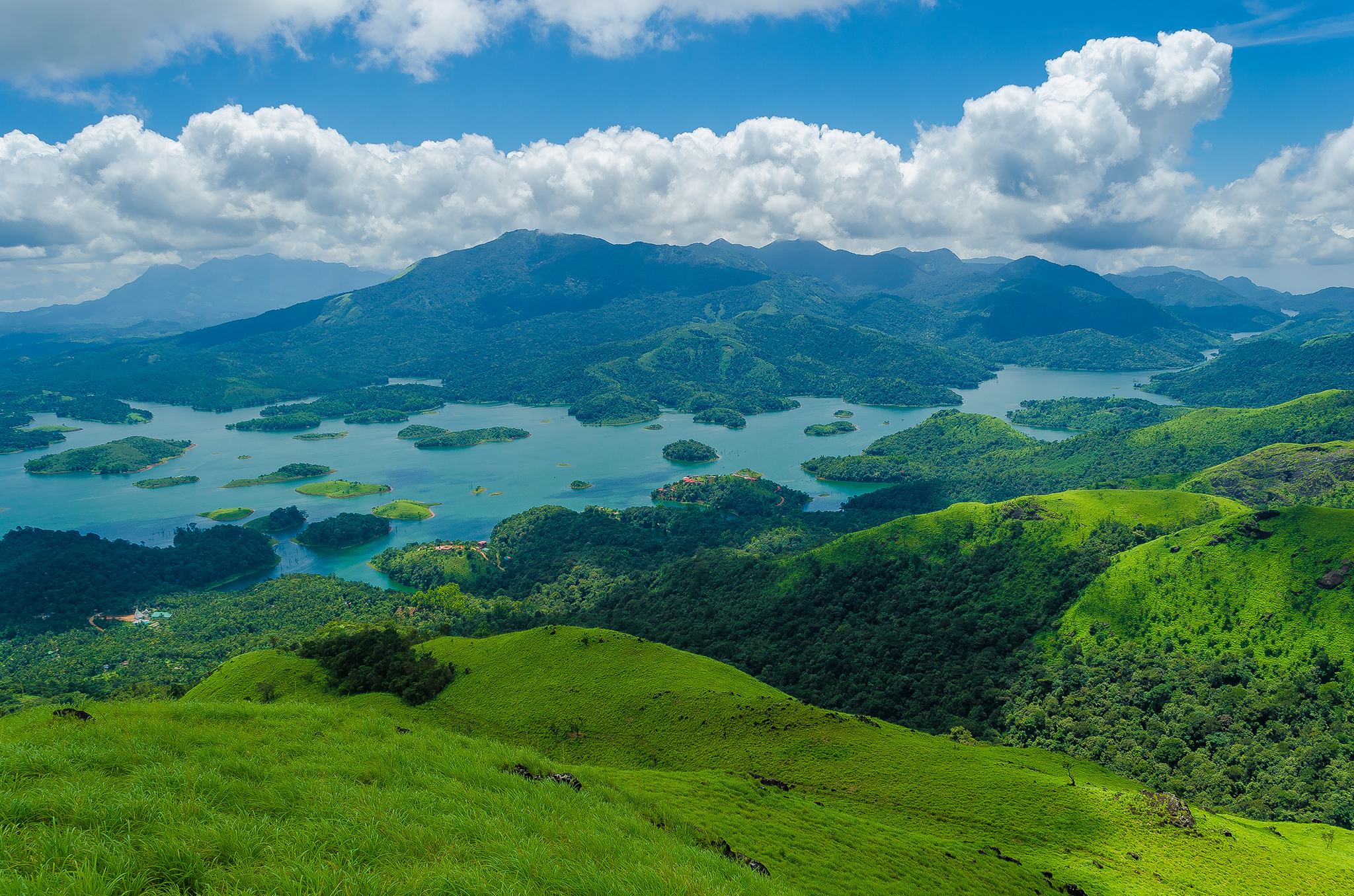
The view of reservoir from nearby mountains

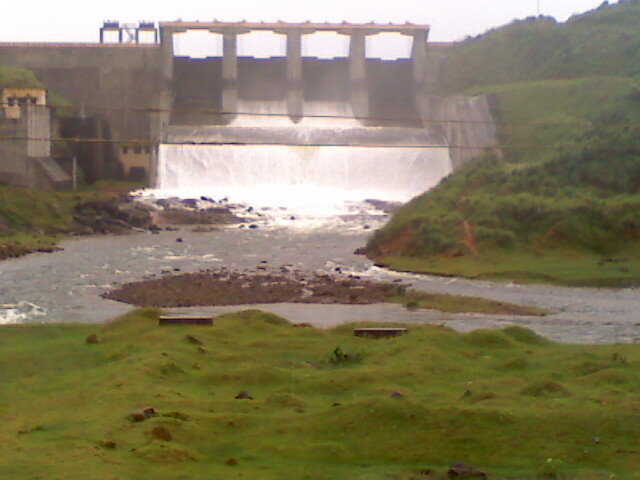
Banasura sagar spillway dam, which is adjacent to the Main earthfill dam

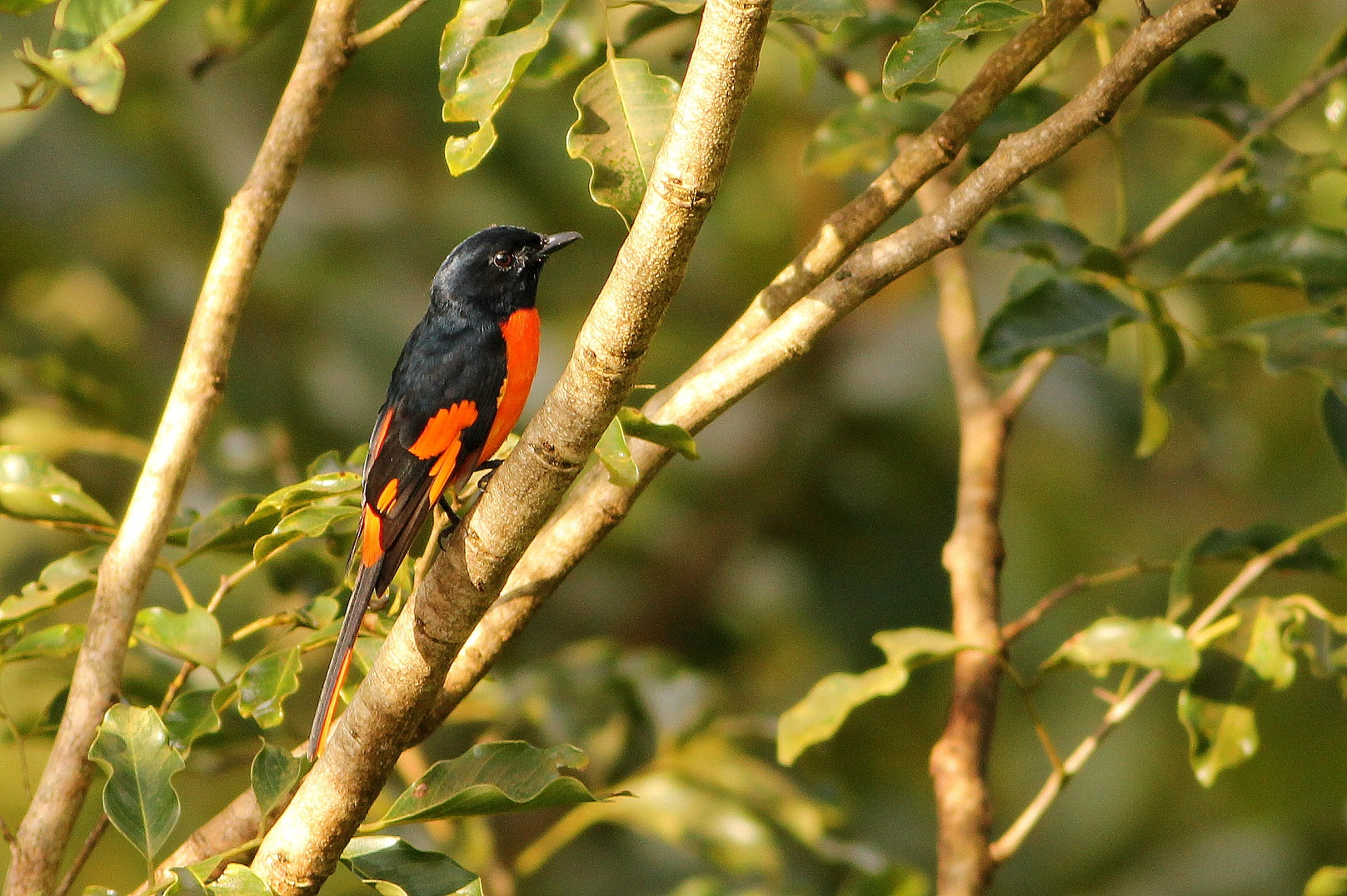
Male orange minivet at Banasura Dam

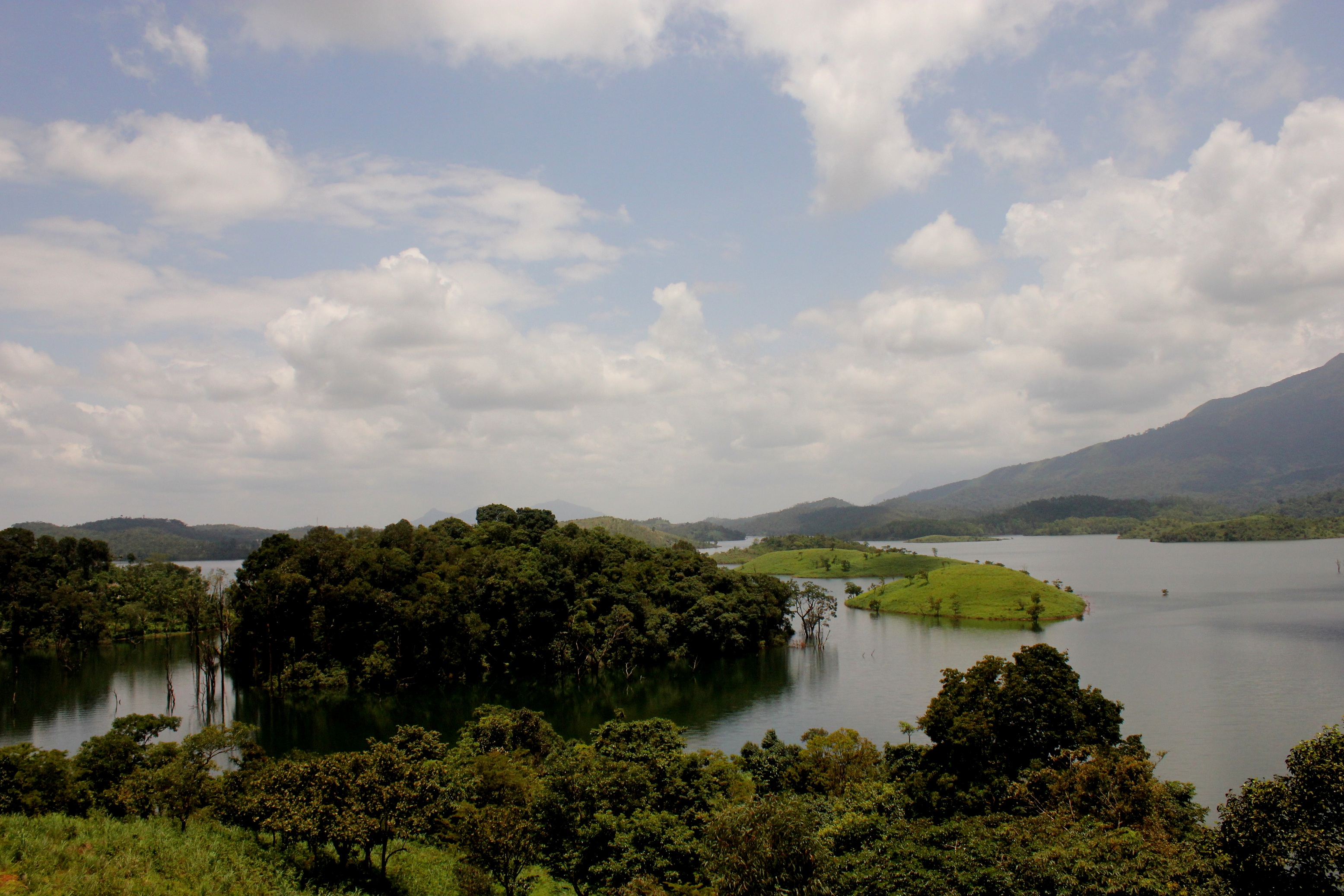
A view from Banasura Dam

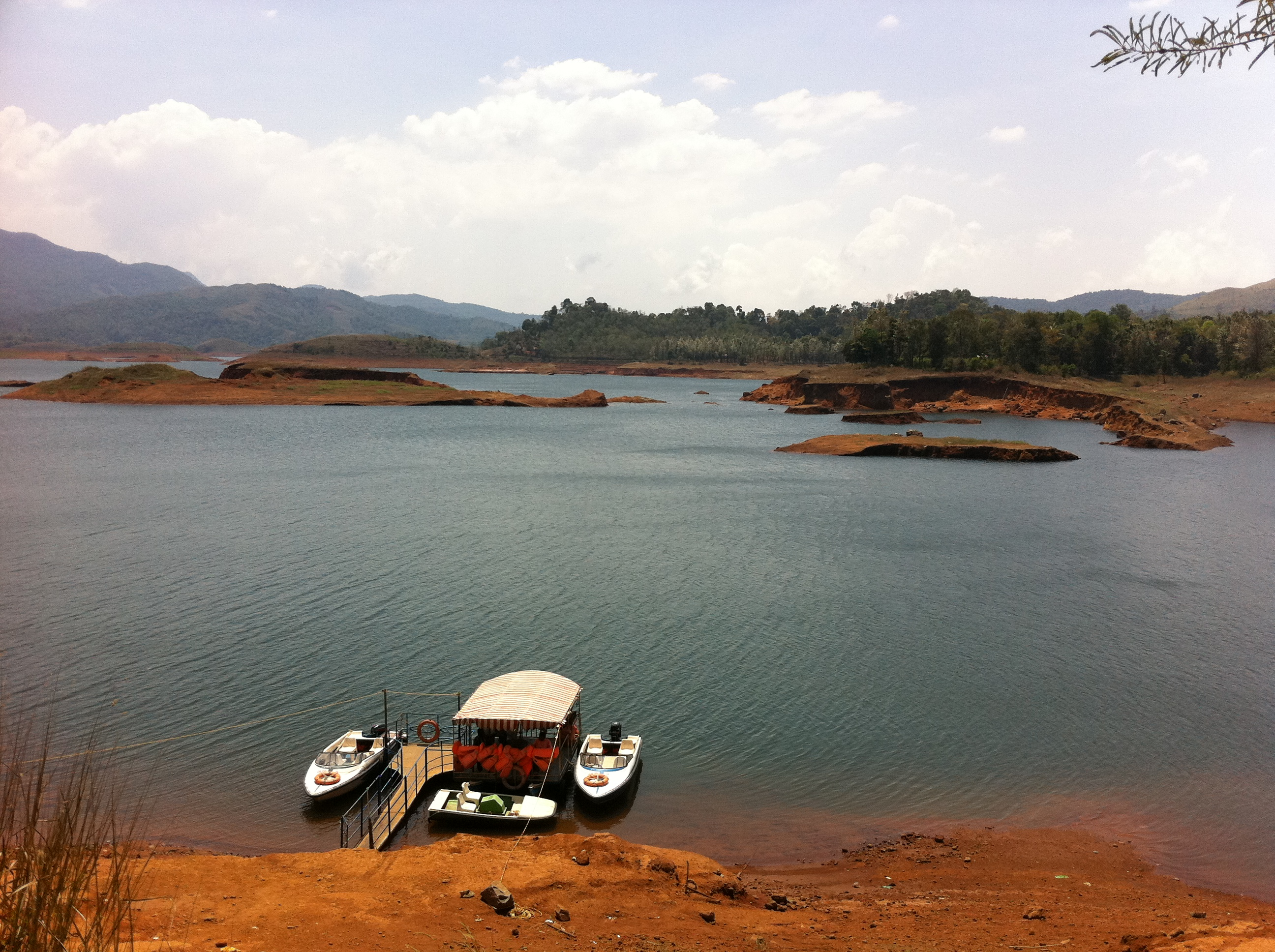
Boating facility

== Current scenario ==
The actual missions for this dam is to provide water for Kakkayam reservoir, which is situated in Kozhikode district to produce electricity and also irrigation in Wayanad. Neither mission was accomplished, and currently it is a part of the Hydel project. It has India's first Solar Atop Dam.

== See also ==
- List of dams and reservoirs in India
- Thariode
