= Padinjarathara =

Padinjarathara Old Thariod
- Town/Panchayat
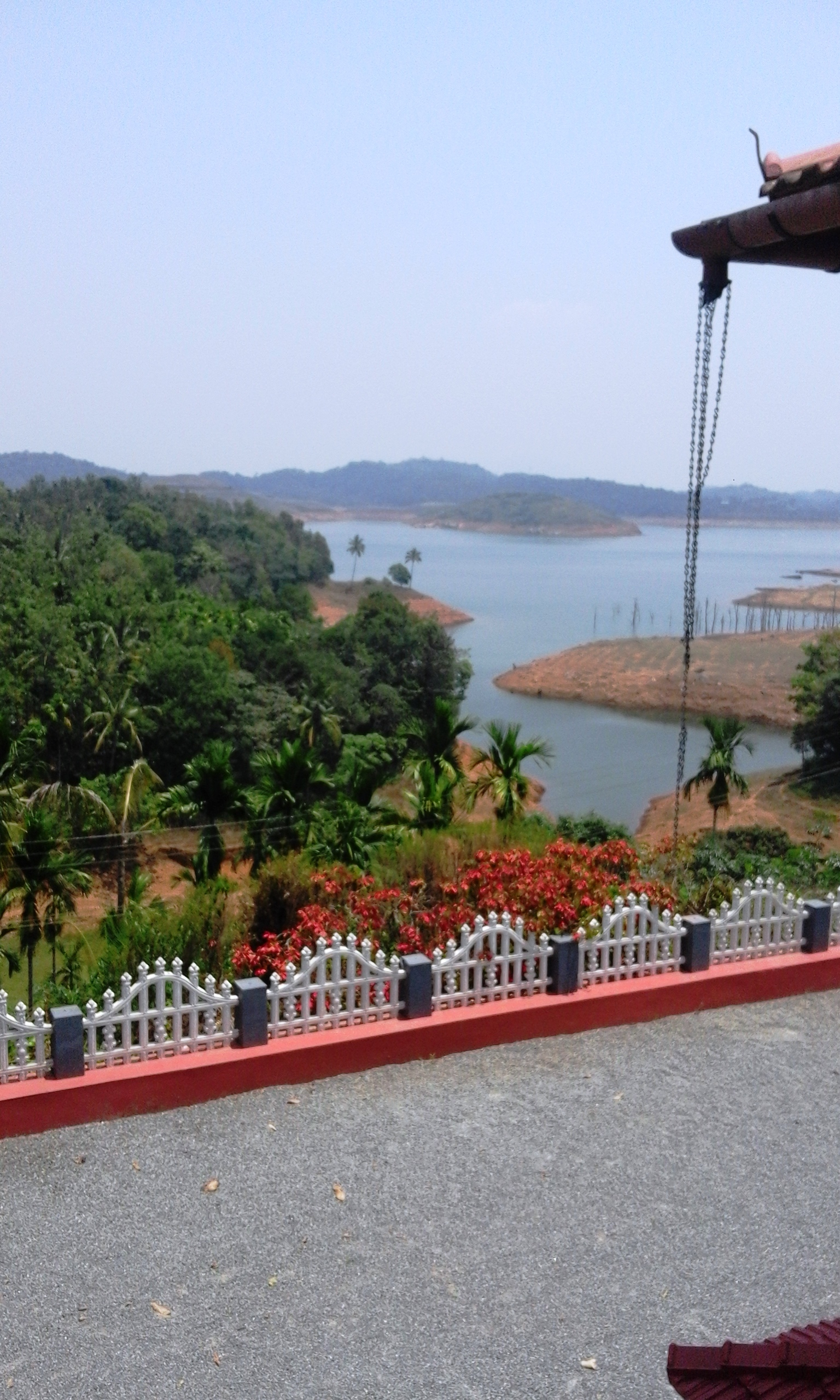
- Banasura Sagar

- Location in Kerala, India Padinjarathara (India)
- Coordinates: 11.6729500°N 75.939270°E
- Country: India
- State: Kerala
- District: Wayanad

Population (2011)
  - Total: 16,146

Languages
  - Official: Malayalam, English
- Time zone: UTC+5:30 (IST)
- PIN: 673575
- ISO 3166 code: IN-KL 12
- Vehicle registration: KL-

Padinjarathara is a major town in Wayanad district in the state of Kerala, India. The largest earth dam in India, Banasura Sagar and other main tourist attractions like Meenmutti Waterfalls, Bappanam Mala, Banasura Hill and Kurumbalakotta are situated in Padinjarathara. India's first operating floating solar power plant was planted in Padinjarathara. It is a major junction between Kozhikode and Kalpetta. State Highway 54 passes through Padinjarathara.

== Demographics ==
As of the 2011 India census, Padinharethara had a population of 16,146 with 7,796 males and 8,350 females and 0 transgender people.

== Suburbs and villages ==
- Padinjarathara
- Kuppadithara
- Kavumannam
- Thariod

== Transportation ==
Padinjarethara can be accessed from Mananthavady or Kalpetta. State Highway 54 lies through Padinjarathara.The Periya ghat road connects Mananthavady to Kannur and Thalassery. The Thamarassery mountain road connects Calicut with Kalpetta. The Kuttiady mountain road connects Vatakara with Kalpetta and Mananthavady. The Palchuram mountain road connects Kannur and Iritty with Mananthavady. The road from Nilambur to Ooty is also connected to Wayanad district through the village of Meppadi.

The nearest railway station is at Kozhikode and the nearest airports are Kannur International Airport at 84 km away, Kozhikode International Airport at 90 km away, and Bengaluru International Airport at 290 km away.

== Important landmarks ==
- Banasura Sagar Dam – the largest dam in India
- Taj International Resort
- Meenmutty Waterfalls
- Kurumbalakotta
- Salient Football Turf Padinjarathara
- Louis Mount Psychiatric Hospital
- Manjoora Saddle Dam
- Nayanmoola Saddle Dam
- Banasura Hills
- Banasura Exhibition Centres
- Elievers Church
- Varambatta Makham
- Sree Kirathamoorthy Temple
- Peechangode Kavu Temple
- Maedhinul Uloom Madrasa
- Raulathul Uloom Madrasa Aruval
- Nennethul Uloom Madrasa Puzhakkal Peedika
- Paradevatha Bhagavatghy Temple, Pathinaru
- Carmel Bhavan Padinharethara
- Veettikkamoola Masjidh
- GHSS Padinjarathara

== Image gallery ==
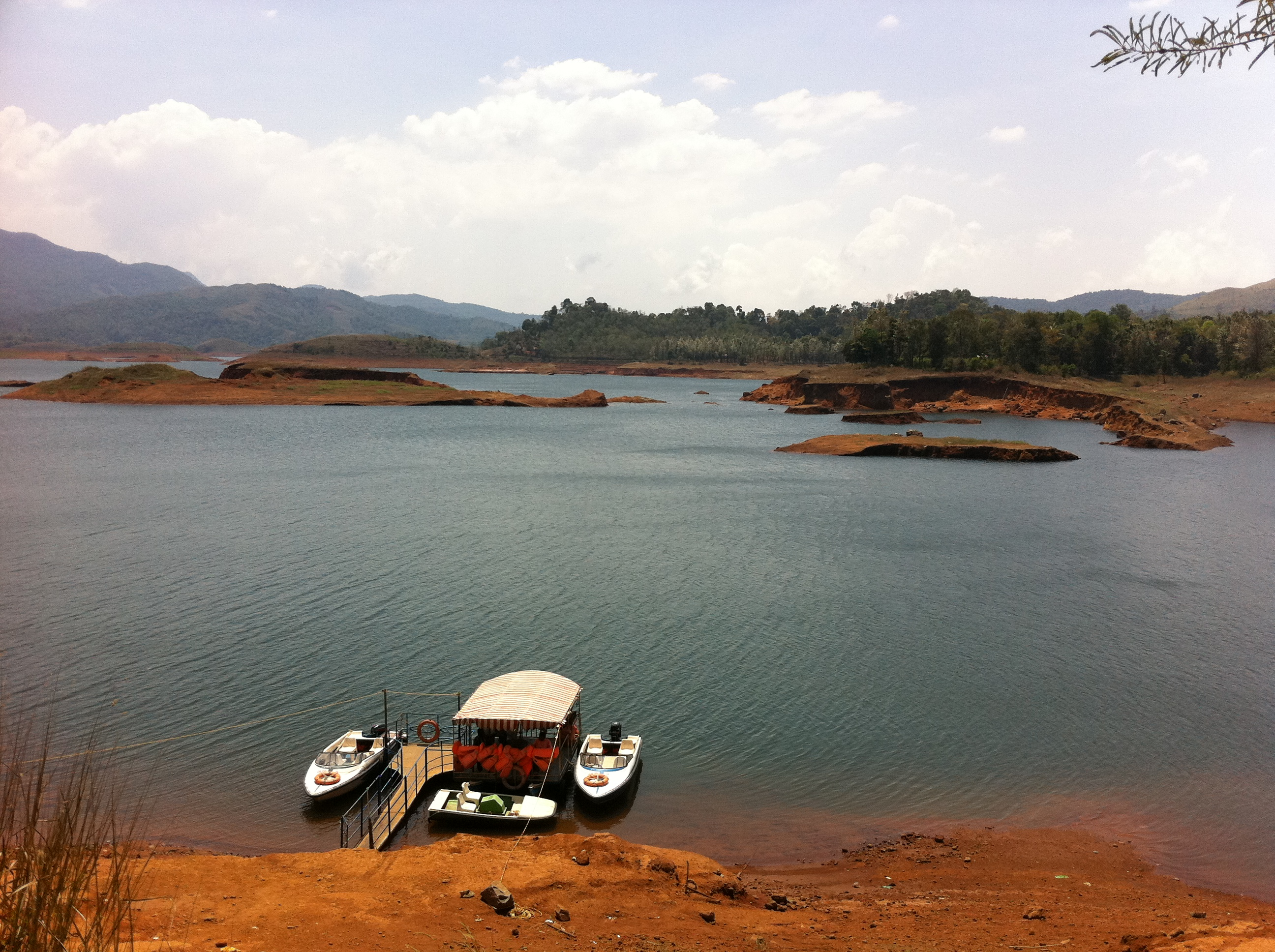
Banasura boating facility

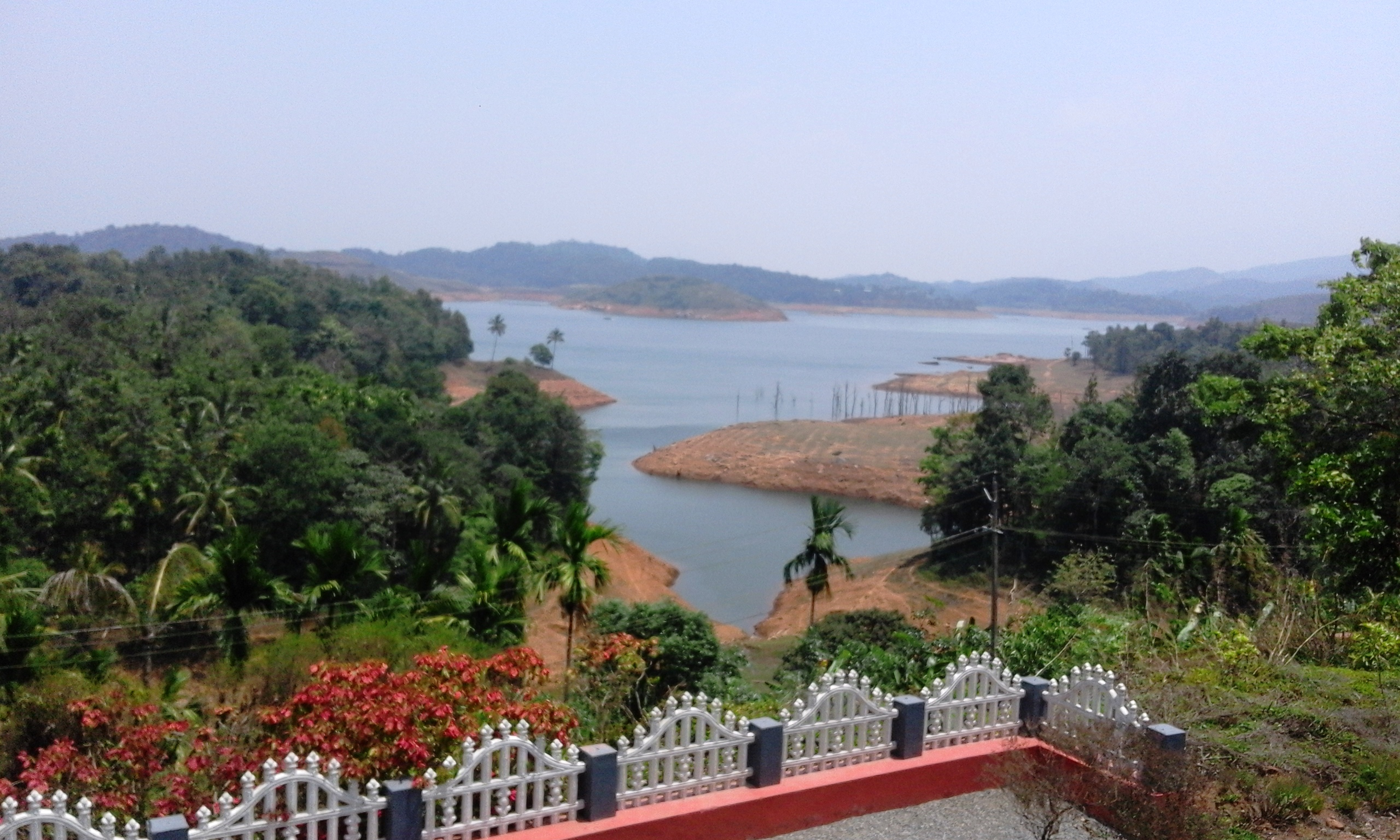
Banasura dam long view

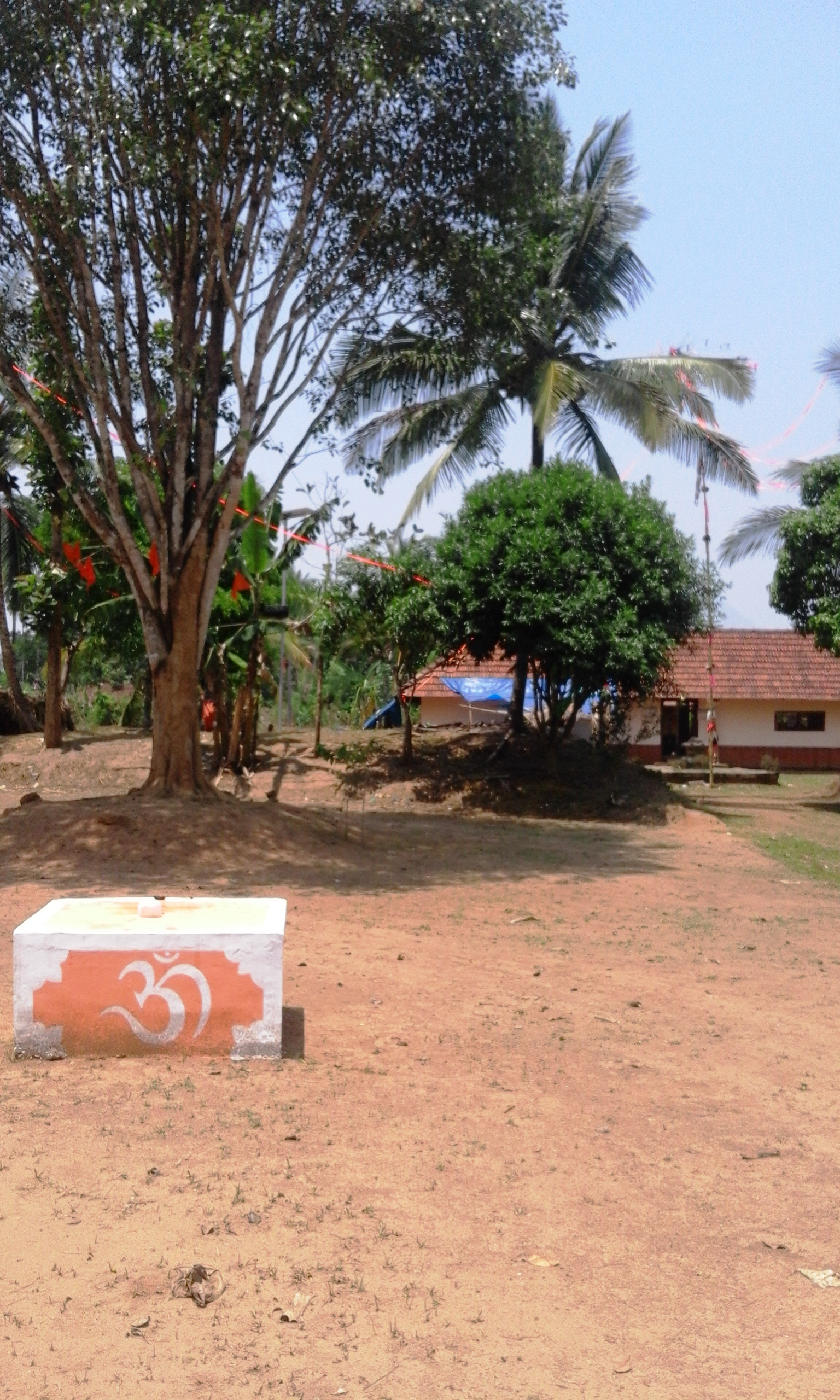
Paradevatha Kavu, Venniyode

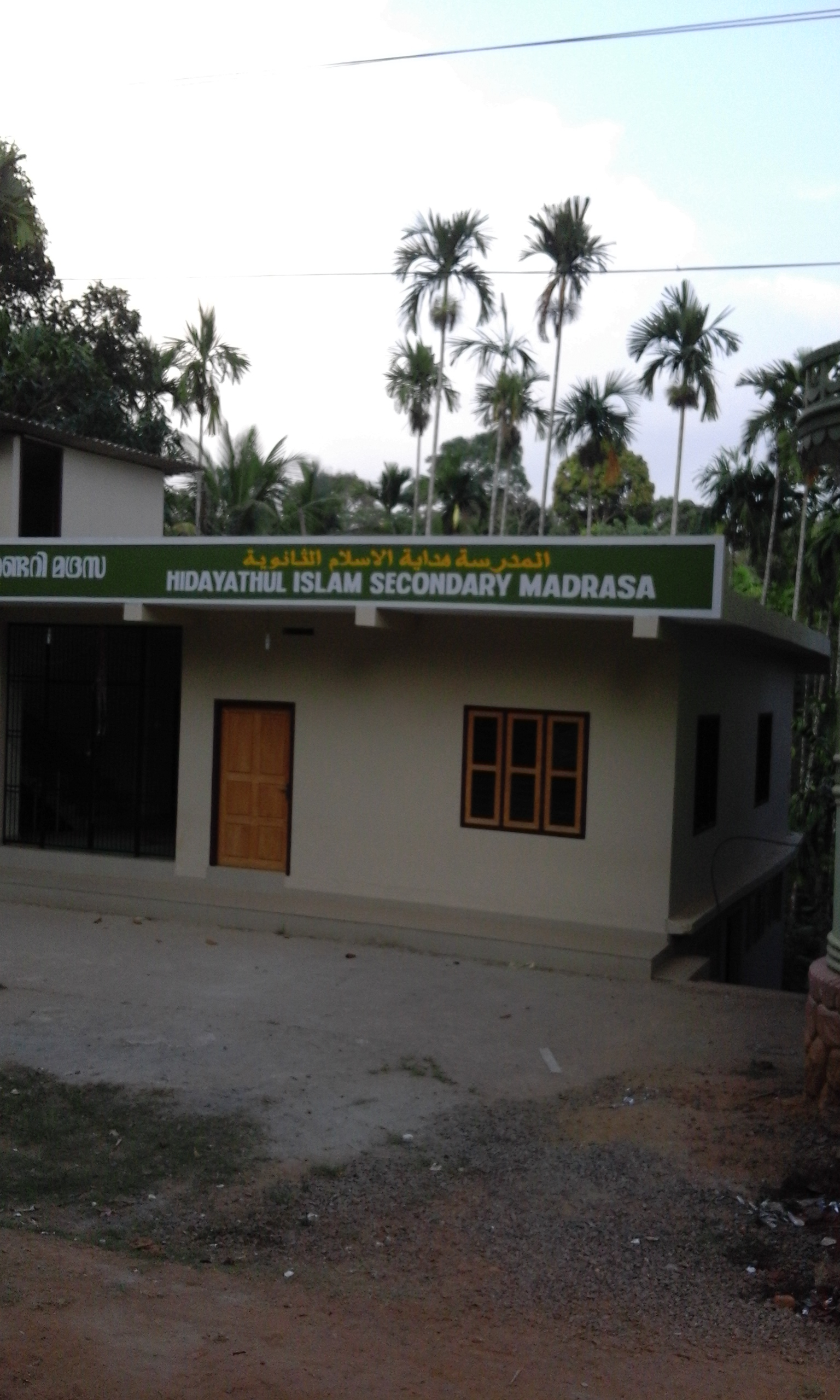
Hidayathulislam Madrasa

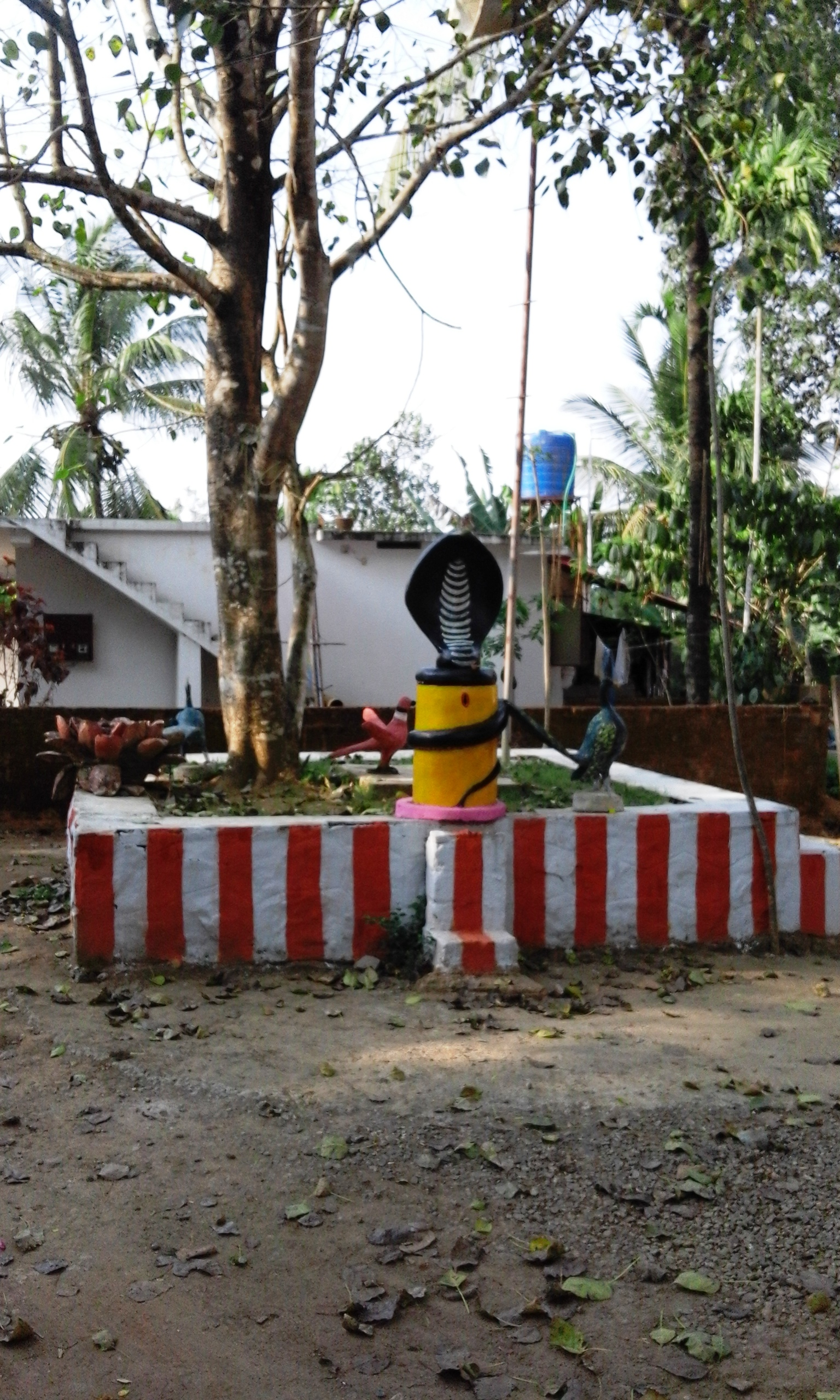
Paradevatha Kavu

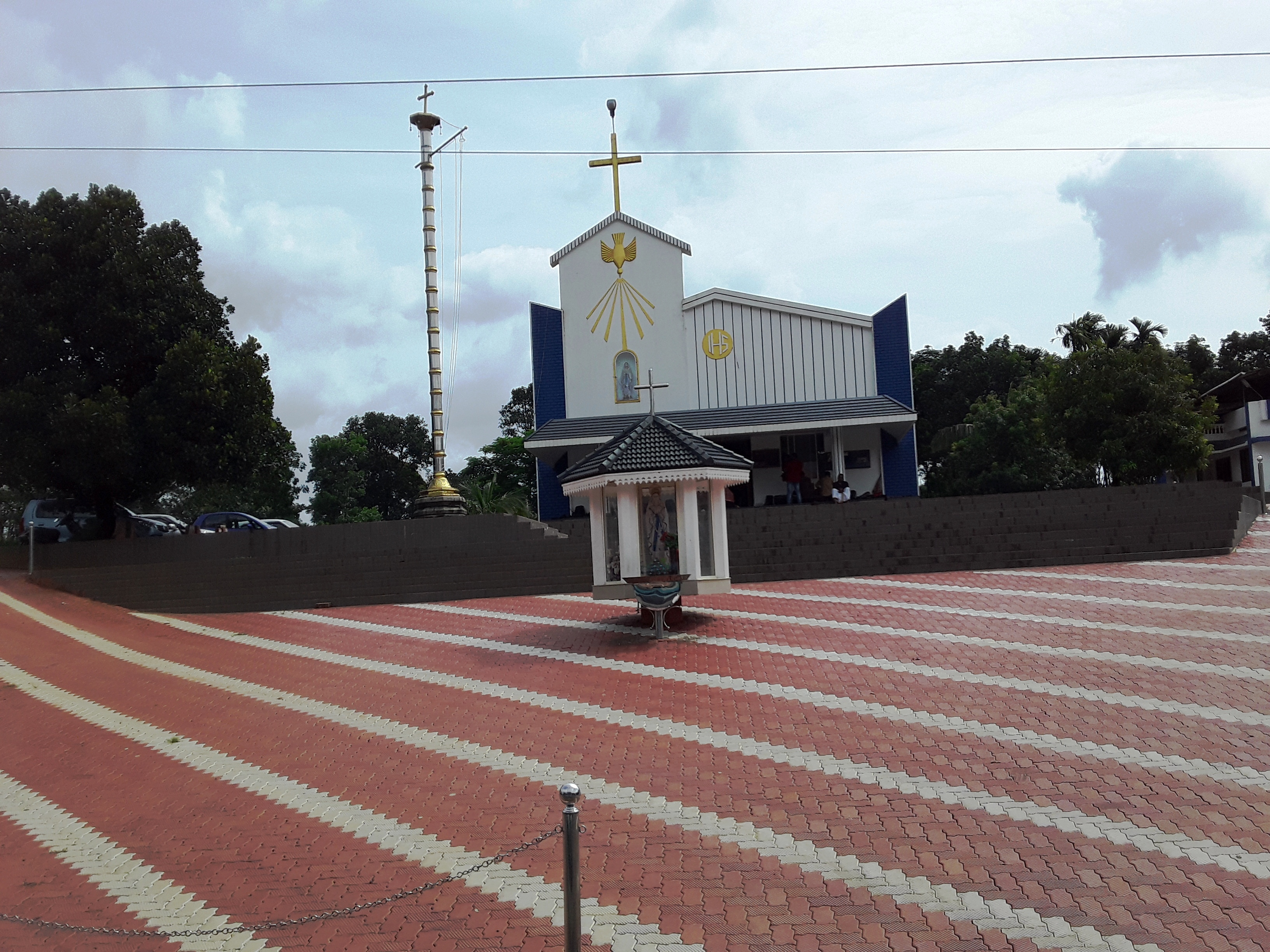
Kavumandam Church
